= Economy of Pernambuco =

Brazilian state

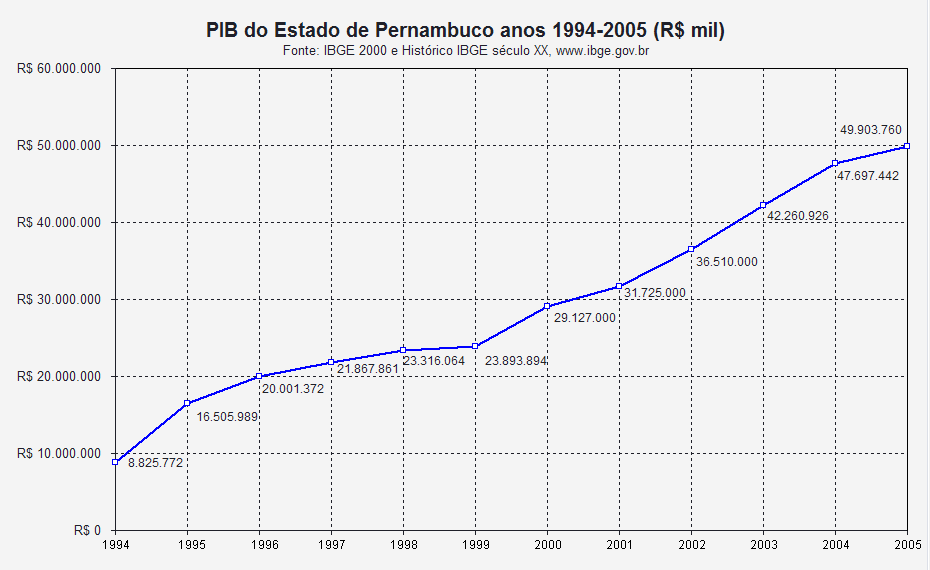
GDP evolution of Pernambuco

The economy of the Brazilian state of Pernambuco is based on agriculture, animal husbandry and industries. The economy of the state, after stagnating from 1985 and 1995, has been growing rapidly since the end of the twentieth century. In 2000, the GDP per capita was R$3.673 ($2098), resulting in more than 40% growth in this period, and more than 10% in a year. In 2007, the GDP per capita grew up to R$7.337 ($4.217).

Since the beginning of the Portuguese domain, the state was basically agriculture based, being one of the biggest sugar cane producers in the country. This is due to the weather and the soil, which is massapê. However, the state is now diversifying its economy; the production of alcohol and sugar (even being the 5th largest Brazilian producer) from the sugar cane is no longer as dominant as it used to be.

The biggest industries are related to food production, cars, shipbuilding, oil refining, chemistry, pharmaceutical (Goiana), textile (Caruaru), electric materials, communication, metallurgy, non-metallic minerals (such as gypsum in Araripina) and tourism. It also plays an important role in fruit productions along the São Francisco River, which is almost totally destined to exportation- mainly concentrated in Petrolina due to its international airport that has a big capacity for receiving cargo airplanes. Gravatá, which is a fast-growing town in the state, is one of the main temperate flower producers in the Northeast.

== Agricultural products ==
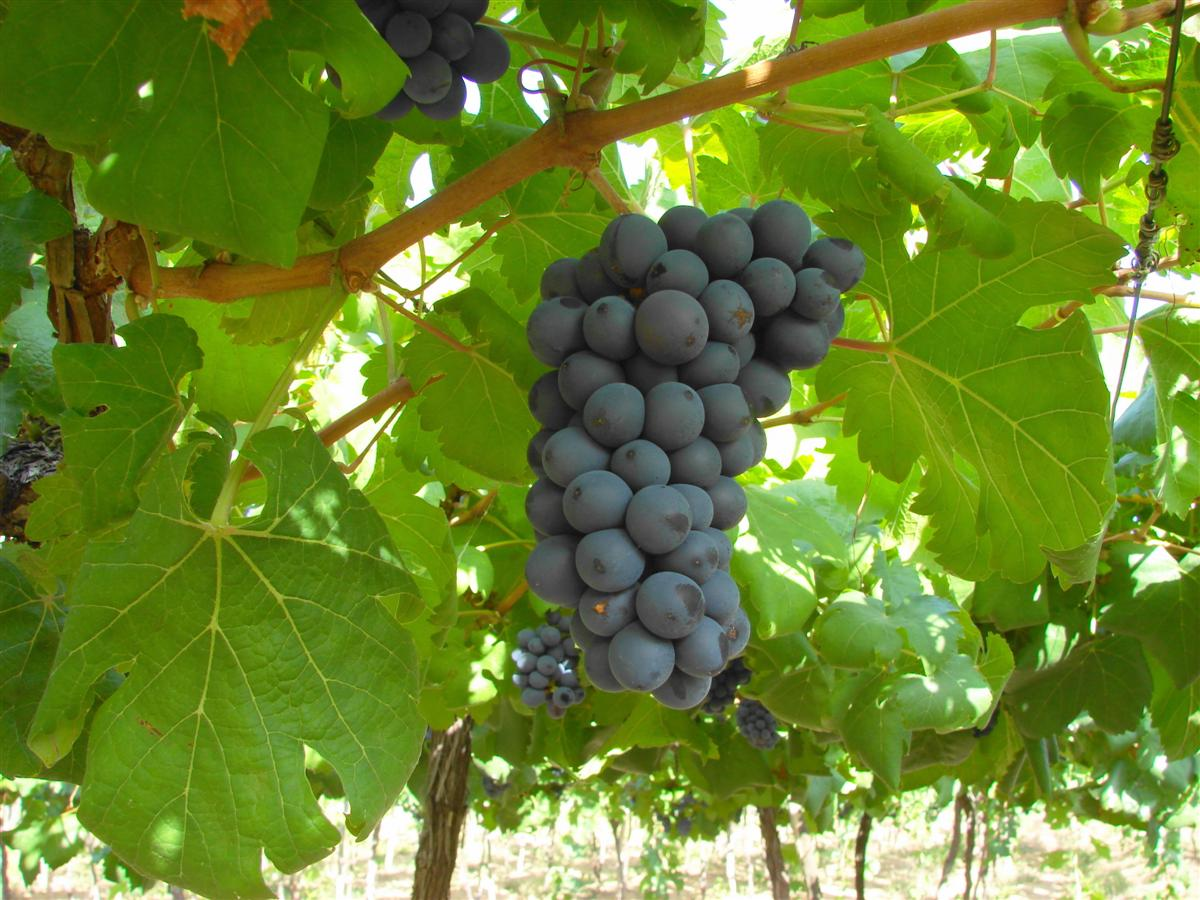
Grape production in São Francisco

Between the major agricultural products cultivated in Pernambuco we can found cotton, banana, beans, sugar-cane, onion, cassava, corn, tomato and grape. In the husbandry, the major domesticated types of animals are cattle, swine, goat-antelope and galliformes. An important point to be made is the growth which the region is seeing after the 70's in the irrigated agriculture in the Sertão do São Francisco.

== Industry and technology ==
Between 1997 and 1999, Suape - a big industrial and portuary complex of the southern littoral of Pernambuco- had a 16,7% growth. The state has the second biggest industrial production in the Northeast, being second to Bahia. From October 2005 to October 2006, Pernambuco had the second biggest industrial growth in Brazil - 6,3%, which is more than twice the national average in that period (2,3%).

Another sector which needs to be mentioned is the mineral extraction. Araripina produces 95% of the plaster consumed in the country. The textile sector plays also one important role in cities such as Caruaru and neighborhoods.

The informatics center in Recife – the Porto Digital – was created a few years ago and it is already between the five biggest in Brazil. It employs about 3,000 people, and has 3.5% participation in the GDP of the state. In 2007, the Digital Port was distinguished as the best Brazilian technological/innovation Park, between the Innovation prize attributed by the Brazilian National Association of Innovation and entrepreneurship (Anprotec).

=== Suape Port ===
Suape port is a Brazilian international port located among the municipalities of Ipojuca and Cabo de Santo Agostinho, inside the Recife metropolitan area and distant 40 km South of the capital (Recife). Suape serves ships 365 days a year without any restriction with regard to tidal schedules. Suape is one of the most important harbour and container terminals in northeast of Brazil playing an important role in the economy of the state of Pernambuco and responsibly for the economic state euphoria due to the construction of a large Petrobras refinery, a petrochemical pole, the largest ship builder in South America and many related and general industries around its 13.5 km^{2} of industrial park. Suape has started in the 21st century to be Pernambuco's motive power toward development. Huge national and international investments are being attracted by its logistic qualities, of which, until 2010, more than US$10 billion are expected.

== New investments ==
Since 2005 Pernambuco has received many large and small public and private investments, mainly due to Suape port, general logistics, Government strategy of decentralization and geographical position of itself and the capital in the Northeast.

- Abreu e Lima Refinery. Owned by Petrobras and PDVSA (40%).
- Atlantico Sul Shipbuilder, the largest one on the South Atlantic Ocean. 1,2B USD$ invested and 5000 direct jobs.
- Petrochemical pole, with 3 integrated companies to produce Partially Oriented Yarn (POY), PTA & PET. Total investments of 2.3B USD$ and 1800 direct jobs upon completion.
- Gerdau and CSN large steel-making plants.
- Bunge wheat factory-processor, 850000 tons of annual capacity.
- Novartis and Hemobrás pharmo-chemical plants in Goiana.Total investments up to 700M USD$ and 515 direct jobs.
- Sadia & Perdigão food factories in Bom Conselho and Vitória de Santo Antão. Total investments up to 150M USD$ and 950 direct jobs.
- Ecological Resorts in Paiva and Porto (Barreiros) beaches.
- Many mediums and small investments especially on the Suape complex.

== Main cities ==
List of the 25 largest cities in Pernambuco
Ranking	City	Population (2009)	GDP (R$x1000)(2006).	GDP PC (R$)
1	Recife	1,561,659	20,718,107	13,510
2	Jaboatão dos Guararapes	687,688	5,578,363	8,384
3	Olinda	397,268	2,179,183	5,567
4	Paulista	319,373	1,367,111	4,449
5	Caruaru	298,501	1,993,295	6,895
6	Petrolina	281,851	1,932,517	7,202
7	Cabo de Santo Agostinho	171,583	2,813,188	17,244
8	Camaragibe	143,210	492,113	3,608
9	Garanhuns	131,313	742,593	5,941
10	Vitória de Santo Antão	126,399	745,504	6,149
11	Igarassu	100,191	734,430	7,834
12	São Lourenço da Mata	99,945	310,748	3,261
13	Abreu e Lima	96,266	567,474	6,154
14	Santa Cruz do capibaribe	80,330	332,112	4,507
15	Serra Talhada	80,294	434,704	5,705
16	Araripina	79,877	255,578	3,368
17	Ipojuca	75,512	5,354,635	76,418
18	Gravatá	75,229	306,637	4,284
19	Goiana	74,424	457,986	6,379
20	Belo Jardim	74,028	504,735	7,113
21	Carpina	68,070	351,448	5,375
22	Arcoverde	68,000	290,529	4,479
23	Ouricuri	66,978	200,880	3,186
24	Pesqueira	64,454	236,259	3,852
25	Escada	62,604	233,562	3,902
RMR	Recife metropolitan area	3,768,902	40,872,963	10,845
State	PERNAMBUCO	8,810,256	62,255,687	7,337
