= Trans-Amazonian Railway =

Proposed transcontinental railway

Overview
- Other name(s): EF-354; Twin Ocean Railroad
- Native name: Ferrovia Transoceânica
- Status: Under Planning
- Locale: South America
- Termini: Ilo, Peru; Port of Açu, Brazil

Service
- Type: Transcontinental railroad

Technical
- Track length: 5,600 km (3,500 mi)
- Track gauge: 1,435 mm (4 ft 8 1/2 in) standard gauge

The Trans-Amazonian Railway is a proposed transcontinental railway through the Amazon Basin in Brazil, Bolivia, and Peru. The project was conceived in 2013 and announced in 2015 by Chinese and Bolivian leaders as part of a larger plan to create a Chinese-funded transportation network to support Bolivian imports and exports. The 1,435 mm (4 ft 8 1/2 in) standard gauge transcontinental railroad megaproject proposed to link the Atlantic and Pacific Oceans by cutting through the Amazon rainforest. It was estimated to cost $10 billion circa 2015 and $72 billion circa 2023, and may not be able to recoup costs. Its sister projects include the Nicaragua Canal and a Colombian railway. It was included in the Brazilian National Transportation Plan.

The project received backlash from various native tribes, conservationists, ecologists, and news media concerned with the integrity of the Amazon rainforest and negative impact on the lives and well-being of native peoples. Past development projects have endangered native peoples with the introduction of violence from illegal loggers and cattle ranchers. There are also concerns that environmental impact has not been properly gauged and communicated to the parties it would effect. An analogous project, the Trans-Amazonian Highway, had a markedly negative impact on native peoples.

Some analysts believe that the railroad is preferential to a trans-continental highway network, as the majority of deforestation happens around roads. The proposed railway would re-use a good portion of already deforested land, reducing impact.

There is a strong incentive to the economy of South America by increasing trade with Asia, and export of beef, soybean, and minerals are expected to boost the economy of several countries along its route. China has encouraged this project both with direct funding and by lifting bans on South American beef imports. As of 2023 China is Brazil's largest beef export market, spending $8 billion on Brazilian beef in 2022. Cattle and beef play a primary role in the deforestation of the Amazon. Cattle ranching is responsible for five times more deforestation in South America than other analyzed commodities, and cattle accounts for 36% of tree cover loss worldwide. Cattle ranching is especially destructive due to the slash-and-burn method ranchers use to clear land, and the feeding habits of cattle being especially thorough and difficult for plants to recover from.

As of 2024, construction has not started yet. The Bolivian state has received assistance from the Inter-American Development Bank and the China Development Bank. The project faces environmental, civil, financial, and legal hurdles.

== Chancay Mega Port ==
In 2025 with the opening of the Chancay megaport, it was proposed to provide a Bi-Oceanic Railway to connect Chancay in Peru with Brazil. Choice of gauge is unclear, since Peru uses 1435mm gauge, Bolivia uses 1000mm gauge and Brazil uses both 1000mm and 1600mm gauges. Chancay is about 70km northwest of Lima.

== See also ==
- Rail transport in Brazil
- Rail transport in Peru
- Transport in Brazil
- Transport in Peru
- Central Bi-Oceanic railway
- Transcontinental railway Brasil-Peru
- Madeira-Mamoré Railroad
- São Luís-Teresina Railway
