= Turbonilla aquilonaria =

Scientific classification
- Kingdom: Animalia
- Phylum: Mollusca
- Class: Gastropoda
- Family: Pyramidellidae
- Genus: Turbonilla
- Species: T. aquilonaria

Binomial name
- Turbonilla aquilonaria Silva-Absalao, Dos Santos & De Olivera, 2003

Species of gastropod

Turbonilla aquilonaria is a species of sea snail, a marine gastropod mollusk in the family Pyramidellidae, the pyrams and their allies.

== Description ==
It was first found by the North-East Coast of Brazil.

It can be identified through its tall shell without spiral sculpture and distinctly conical and almost flat-sided teleoconch whorls.

The shell grows to a length of 4.7 mm.

== Distribution ==
This marine species was found in the intertidal zone, near Cabo de Santo Agostinho, Pernambuco State, Brazil
