= Trans-Amazonian Highway =

Major highway in Brazil

BR-230 Trans-Amazonian Highway

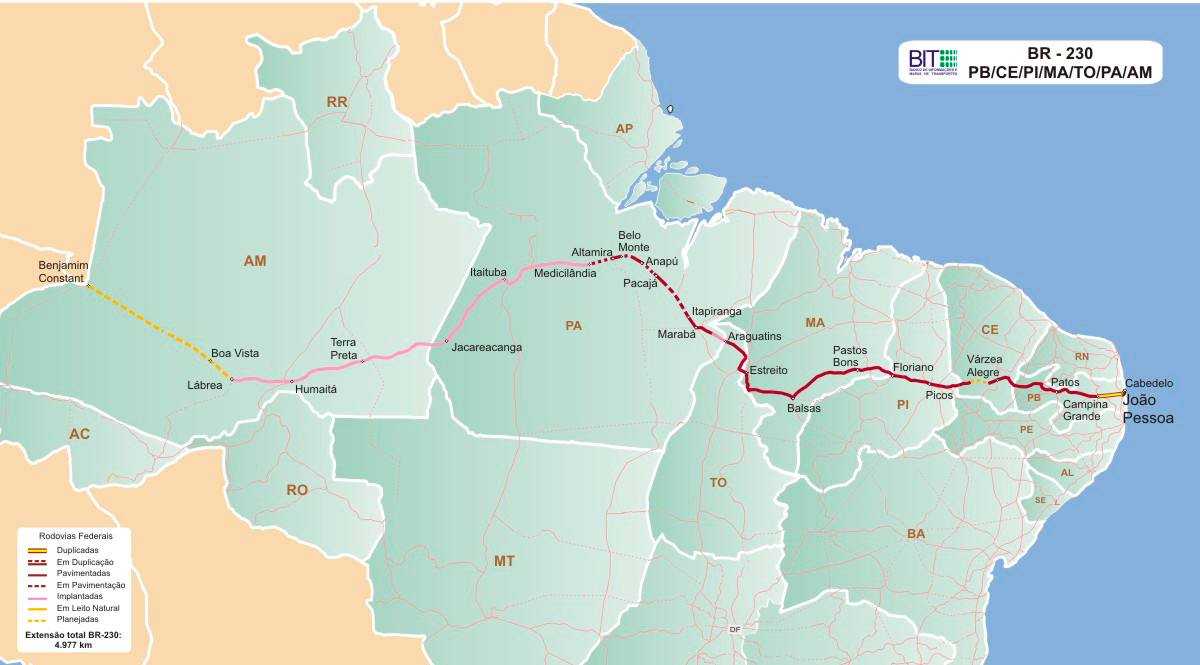
- Map of BR-230 (paved portion shown in red)

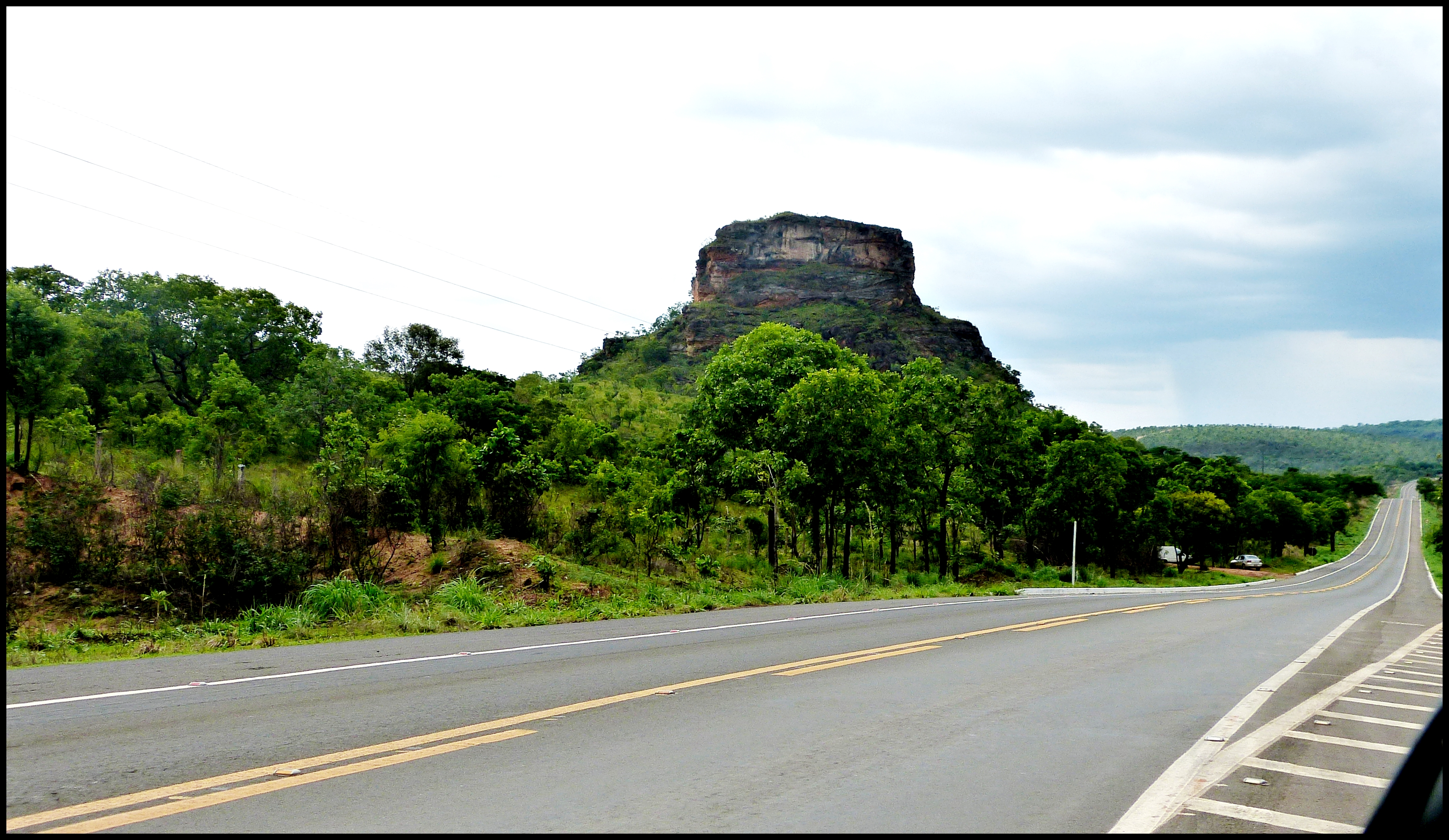

Location
- Country: Brazil

Highway system
- Highways in Brazil; Federal

The Trans-Amazonian Highway (official designation BR-230, official name Rodovia Transamazônica Portuguese pronunciation: [ho.doˈvi.ɐ tɾɐ̃.za.maˈzõ.ni.kɐ]) was introduced on September 27, 1972. It is 4,000 km long, making it the third longest highway in Brazil. It runs through the Amazon forest and the Brazilian states of Paraíba, Ceará, Piauí, Maranhão, Tocantins, Pará, and Amazonas, from the proximities of Saboeiro up until the town of Lábrea.

== History ==
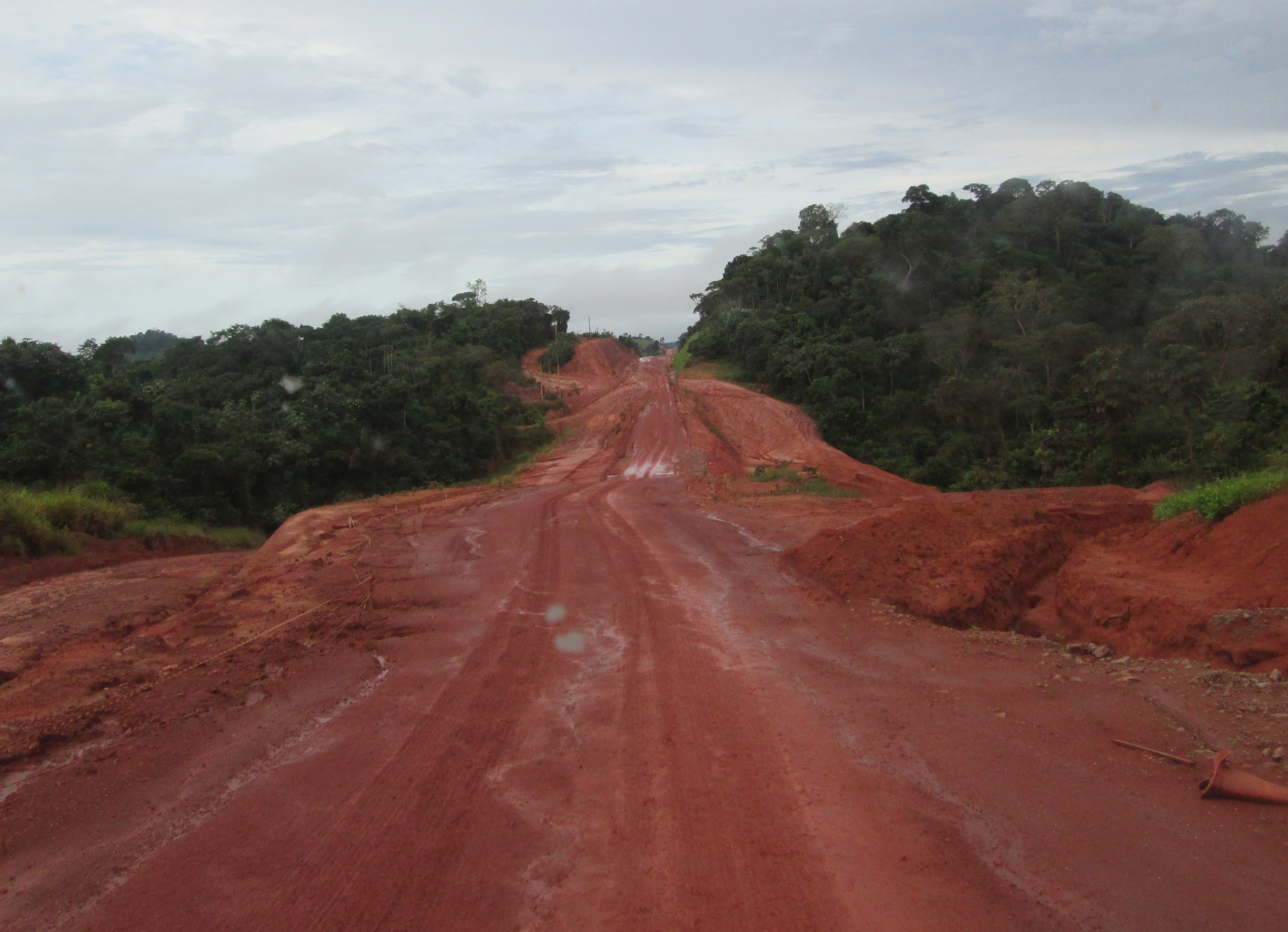
An unpaved portion of the highway, taken between Rurópolis and Uruará.

The Trans-Amazonian Highway is stationed in the Brazilian Amazon. BR-230 is one of the major highways for travel throughout the Amazon forest. These building projects pave roads that help transportation vehicles get by in the Amazonian jungle. Other federally recognized highways have also been constructed but are mostly unfinished. People who live close by often travel via these highways and vehicles. The project was started by the military dictatorship that was in power from 1964 to 1985 out of their perceived need to guarantee control over the remote regions while encouraging economic engagement with the natural resources in the region. The highway was intended to integrate these regions with the rest of the country, and with Colombia, Peru and Ecuador. Another main goal of the project was to alleviate the effects of the drought affecting the Northeast region of the country by providing a route to largely empty land in the middle of the rainforest, which could be settled. during the 1970's the highways construction allowed the country's agricultural sector to expand exponentially. Allowing a multitude of settlements to be connected and constructed along the highway. The highway made land much more accessible to more metropolitan areas of the country, an example of this is highway BR-364. Settlers at the time had rushed to cultivate this untouched land; they established farms, raised livestock, and developed agricultural business in the area. However, some communities experienced difficulties since long-term farming in the region wouldn't be viable. As development of the land continued, the eventual need for more land inevitably arose. It was originally planned to be a fully paved highway 5200 kilometers long. However, these plans were modified following its inauguration.

In particular, because of high construction costs and Brazil financial crisis in the late 1970s, only a part of the highway was paved, from its beginning to 200 km ahead of Marabá. The lack of a fully sealed road caused many problems. Travel on the non-paved stretches of the highway is extremely difficult during the region's rainy season between October and March. In the wet season cars often get stuck in the poorly constructed road and in the dry season there are often pot holes in the dry mud roads that damage vehicles.

Construction of the highway was very challenging because of the remoteness of the site. Workers building the road were frequently isolated and without communication. Occasional visits to nearby cities provided the only outside contact. However, several techniques and procedures that evolved during the construction of Belém-Brasília Highway (BR-153) were then used. According to DNIT, roughly 800 km of the highway is due to be paved in the next 4 years, improving transport links in the central region of Pará state. The Brazilian Government are now planning to pave the whole highway with tarmac. As of December 2009, paving was underway between the town of Ruropolis and Itaituba and north to Santarém. This will connect soy plantations with overland trucking routes to the south of Brazil. The road has been left untouched however at points further west of Itaituba, at times narrowing to roughly 2 meters wide.

Access to the construction sites was mostly accomplished by small airplanes using temporary airstrips and boats. Today construction vehicles can be seen traversing the road east and west bringing dirt and gravel to prepare for paving operations.

In 2019 the Brazilian government announced that it was seeking to privatize major sections of BR-230 in an attempt to pave more sections of the road.

In September 2022, the Brazilian government finished restoration on a paved 33.3-kilometer section of BR-230 located in the arid northern Tocantins between Aguiarnópolis and Trevo de Nazaré. There are still many sections of the road in the Amazon that remain unpaved entirely.

== Characteristics ==
Ministry of Infrastructure resumes paving works at Transamazônica

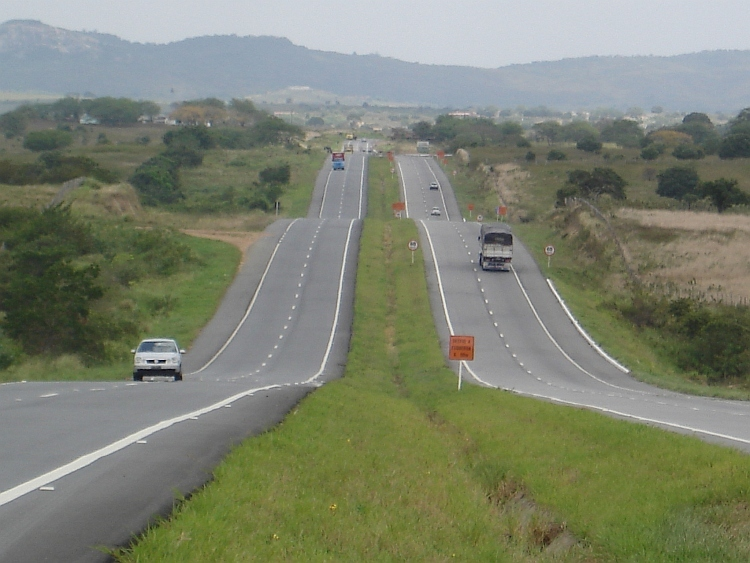
Trans-Amazon Highway, section duplicated between Campina Grande and Cabedelo

The BR-230 or Transamazônica is a transversal highway, considered the third longest highway in Brazil, with 4260 km in length, that connects the port city of Cabedelo in Paraíba with the municipality of Lábrea, in Amazonas, cutting through some of bá, Altamira and Itaituba. It also connects with ports on the Northeast coast, like Suape Port. In Paraíba it represents the main axis of movement of people and goods between its municipalities, having as reference the port of Cabedelo and the cities of João Pessoa, Campina Grande, Patos, Pombal, Sousa and Cajazeiras, the largest economic centers in the state. It crosses the soil of Paraíba for 521 km, with good traffic conditions up to the border with the state of Ceará.

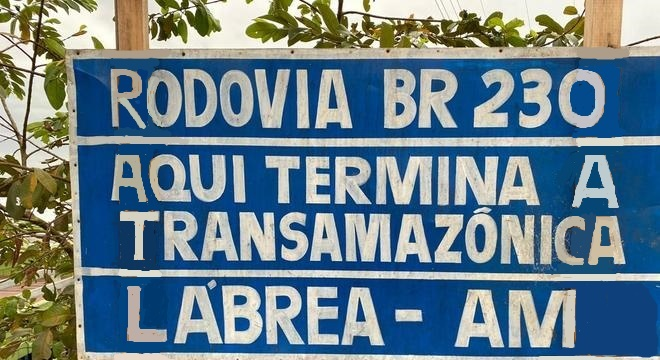
Lábrea – provisional end of BR-230

The 147.6 km long section between Cabedelo, where its milestone 0 is located, and Campina Grande, passing through Grande João Pessoa and other municipalities, was doubled under the Fernando Henrique Cardoso government. Additional duplication is expected between the municipalities of Campina Grande and Cajazeiras.

Designed to better integrate the north of Brazil with the rest of the country, it was inaugurated on August 27, 1972, still unfinished and there are several sections to be paved. Initially designed to be an 8,000-kilometer-long paved highway, connecting the north and northeast regions of Brazil with Peru and Ecuador, it has not undergone major changes since its inauguration. Later, the project was modified to 4,977 km to Benjamin Constant, however construction in Lábrea was interrupted, totaling 4,260 km.

== Environmental impacts ==
A journal led article by Edna Santos de Souza et al, published in 2014 detailed their work examining the soil contents near the ever expanding highways for potentially toxic elements and gathered samples. Information about the soil contents was taken from vegetation, and its later found that farming, mining and logging were the direct cause of the contamination. Although Potentially Toxic Elements are found is soil occurs naturally and over time, The boom in industry has in thew surrounding area is accelerating the process at troubling rates. The reason for this is the heavy use of pesticides and fertilizers, as well as industrialization in the area.

== Public Health and Safety ==
The local rise in energy source exploitation and urbanization exist beside neighboring communities. The Arara (para) tribe, and small villages throughout the decade experienced a noticeable decline in welfare. these isolated individuals mortality rates have climbed because of the struggle to meet growing demand. The government and external companies exploit the surrounding lands resources which the locals rely on. Instead, industrializing preexisting farms, now for pharmaceutical and agricultural purposes; deforesting native species in the process. The mean annual parasitic index (API) shows that from 2003 to 2005, calculated as the total number of positives

Data has been found for 70 municipalities within the Cuiabá-Santarém highway (BR-163) a highway that branches off from BR-230. This expansion of urban population has spiked and increased population health concerns within the Amazon. Factors such as uneven class distribution, social inequality, and developing economies Leave room for social and criminal issues. Studies show that these have contributed to the rise of homicide mortality, AIDS, and malaria. Growing numbers have also been prevalent outside of these regions, located outside of the western Pará state and northern Mato Grosso. The geographic areas located in proximity of highway BR-163 have been tested for data concerning the health conditions in its area of influence. This introduction of factors affecting health has been closely monitored; the total number of homicides classified by the World Health Organization include E960-E969, E985-E986 (injury by firearm or perforating a weapon) divided by the total population, multiplied by 100,000.

Development of BR-230 has negatively affected the indigenous populations that live along the highway since it was first constructed in the 1970s. In the state of Para, the Arara Indigenous Territory borders the Trans-Amazonian highway for 28 kilometers. This has exposed them to illegal fishing, hunting, and logging practices for decades thanks to the easy access from the highway. The Arara people are extremely protective of their land, with members from different villages taking part in missions surveying their encroached upon land and looking for weaknesses that could be exploited by incoming settlers. They then defend vulnerable areas of their territory from outsiders.

== Economy by state ==
BR-230 has a leading role in the development of the economy of several Brazilian states.

=== Paraíba ===
Paraíba's economy is the 19th richest in the country and the sixth in the Northeast (behind Bahia, Pernambuco, Ceará, Maranhão and Rio Grande do Norte, and ahead of Alagoas, Sergipe and Piauí). According to data from 2014, the Gross Domestic Product of Paraíba was R $155,143 million and the GDP per capita was R $16,722.05. The largest economies in Paraíba are João Pessoa, Campina Grande, Cabedelo, Santa Rita and Patos.

In 2010, taking into account the municipal population of eighteen years of age or older, 59.3% were economically employed, 32.2% were economically inactive, and 8.5% were unemployed. Still in the same year, taking into account the employed population in the same age group, 40.30% worked in the services sector, 23.38% in agriculture, 15.55% in commerce, 7 96% in manufacturing industries, 7.09% in civil construction and 1.15% in public utility. Cabedelo, in the João Pessoa Metropolitan Region, is the third largest economy in the state and the highest GDP per capita in Paraíba.

At the end of the 16th century, when the occupation of the territory of Paraíba began, the economy of Paraíba was centralized in the primary sector (agriculture), mainly in the cultivation of sugar cane. According to the IBGE, Paraíba had, in 2015, a herd of 10,647,748 chickens, 1,170,803 cattle, 566,576 goats, 501,362 sheep, 312,409 quails, 174,533 pigs, 52,683 horses and 913 buffaloes. In the same year, the state produced, in temporary crops, sugar cane (6801,981 t), pineapple (290,772 thousand fruits), cassava (131,073 t), sweet potato (30,192 t), tomato (13,045 t), corn (10,934 t), beans (7,019 t), watermelon (4,292 t), onion (2,256 t), broad beans (1,439 t), potatoes (473 t), rice (360 t), peanuts (252 t), herbaceous cotton (228 t ) and garlic (10 t). [120] In permanent cultivation: banana (134,606 t), coco-da-bay (36,385 t), papaya (30,810 t), mandarin (15,304 t), mango (11,306 t), passion fruit (8,287 t), orange (5,424 t), sisal (5,035 t), grape (2,196 t), guava (2,023 t), lemon (1,882 t), cashews (960 t), avocado (624 t), annatto (395 t) and black pepper ( 58t). In 2011, the municipalities with the highest agricultural gross domestic product in the state were, in descending order, Pedras de Fogo, Santa Rita, Itapororoca and Araçagi.

In 2018, Paraíba had an industrial GDP of R$8.8 billion, equivalent to 0.7% of the national industry and employing 109,825 workers in the industry. The main industrial sectors are: Construction (32.1%), Industrial Services of Public Services, such as Electricity and Water (23.9%), Leather and Footwear (11.3%), Food (6%) and Non-Metallic Minerals (5.9%). These 5 sectors concentrate 79.2% of the state industry.

Paraíba's industrial profile is mainly focused on the benefit of minerals and raw materials from the primary sector. The main industrial centers of Paraíba, as well as the main industrial centers of the state, are: in the forest area, the Metropolitan Region of João Pessoa (Bayeux, Cabedelo, Conde, João Pessoa, Lucena and Santa Rita), where the industries are mainly food, cement, civil construction and textiles; in the wild, Campina Grande, where once again the food industries stand out, as well as those of beverages, footwear, industrialized fruits and, more recently, software; in the interior, Cajazeiras, Patos, São Bento and Sousa, with an emphasis on the textile and clothing industries. Industrial activity in the state is, to this day, in the process of development, with the aim of generating better living conditions for the population. The highest GDP in the secondary sector are João Pessoa, Campina Grande, Santa Rita, Cabedelo and Caaporã.

In commerce, the value of sales throughout the state reached R$4.8 billion, while the entire tertiary sector contributed more than R$25 billion. The state is the fifth largest exporter in the Northeast, standing out in the export of consumer goods, intermediate goods and capital. Sugar, ethyl alcohol, footwear, granite, clothing, sisal, and fabrics are the main products exported from Paraíba abroad, mainly to Australia, Argentina, the United States, Russia, and the European Union.

=== Ceará ===
In 2008, Ceará's GDP, at market prices, was R$60,098,877,000, of which 47.17% is concentrated in the capital, Fortaleza, according to a study by IPECE. However, there is a slight process of decentralization of wealth in the state, since in 2004 the capital represented 47.80% of state GDP. On the other hand, the richest cities, in general, the richest cities continue to increase their share of total GDP. Some of these cities are: Maracanaú (5.19%), Juazeiro do Norte (3.31%), Caucaia (3.25%), Sobral (2.83%), Eusébio (1.56%), Horizonte ( 1.39%), Maranguape (1.07%), Crato (1.07%) and São Gonçalo do Amarante (1.02%).

The five municipalities with the highest GDP per capita in Ceará are: Eusébio (R$23,205), Horizonte (R$15,947), Maracanaú (R$15,620), São Gonçalo do Amarante (R$14,440) and Fortaleza ( R$11,461), all well above the state average, which is R$7,112. The ten municipalities with the highest GDP accounted for 67.86% of total GDP.

Starting in the 1960s, progressive industrialization and urbanization processes took place, which gained momentum starting in the 1980s, partly due to the policy of granting tax benefits to companies that establish themselves in the state. Currently, although it continues to be a sub-industrialized economy in relation to other Brazilian states, the Ceará economy is no longer based primarily on agricultural activities. In fact, the tertiary sector of commerce and services predominates, as well as tourism. However, agriculture, and especially livestock, continue to be relevant in the state's economy, and the importance of non-traditional crops is increasing. Some examples of these crops are the production of fruits and vegetables in the Jaguaribe River valley, and the production of flowers in the Sierra de Ibiapaba and in Cariri Microregion.

Since 2004, Ceará's economy has undergone a period of moderate growth, between 3.5% and 5% per year. In 2007 growth was 4.4%, lower than the Brazilian average; and in 2008 of 6.5%, well above the average, mainly due to the great recovery of the agricultural sector (24.59%), in addition to the maintenance of the high levels of growth of the industry (5.51%) and from the tertiary sector (5.21%). In 2009, despite the international economic crisis and losses in the primary sector, Ceará's GDP grew 3.1%, higher than the change in Brazilian GDP, which was −0.2%, mainly due to the good performance of the service sector. Thus, Ceará's GDP reached more than 2% of national production for the first time. An estimate made by IPECE reveals that Ceará's GDP had record nominal growth, when it grew to 10 billion from 2009 to 2010. In 2010 there was also a record participation of the Ceará economy in the national economy. Such participation, which was 1.89% in 2007, increased to 2.04% in 2010...

In 2011, the Ceará economy continued to grow above the national average. The PIV of Ceará reached 84 billion, an increase of 10 billion compared to the previous year, according to preliminary data from IPECE.

In agriculture, the most important products are: Beans, corn, rice, cotton, cashew nut, sugar cane, cassava, castor bean, tomato, banana, orange, coconut, and more recently the grape are the main products. There has recently been a shift towards irrigated agriculture mainly for export, in areas close to the Chapada del Apodi, devoting itself especially to the cultivation of fruits such as melon and pineapple. The cultivation of flowers has also gained importance in recent times, especially in the Sierra de Ibiapaba.

In livestock, cattle, pigs, goats, horses, poultry, donkey and sheep are mainly kept.

The main resources minerals extracted from Ceará soil are: iron, mineral water, calcareous, clay, magnesium, granite, petroleum, natural gas, sea salt, graphite, gypsum and crude uranium. The municipality of Santa Quitéria has the largest uranium reserve in Brazil.

The main sectors of the industry of Ceará are the manufacture of clothing, the food, metallurgical, textile, chemical and footwear industries. Most of the industries are located in the Metropolitan Region of Fortaleza, especially in Fortaleza, Caucaia and Maracanaú, where the Maracanaú Industrial District is located, an important industrial complex that stimulates the state's economy. The Special Protection Zone for Birds of Ceará will be installed in Caucaia and São Gonçalo do Amarante, in the Pecem Industrial and Port Complex, where a steel industry and a petroleum refinery will also be installed.

The Federation of Industries of the State of Ceará (FIEC) is the union entity of company owners. The entity brings together the majority of owners and industrial leaders. Some of the large companies in Ceará with national scope linked to the FIEC are: Aço Cearense, Companhia de Alimentos do Nordeste, Grendene, Café Santa Clara, Grande Moinho Cearense, Grupo Edson Queiroz, Indústria Naval do Ceará, J. Macêdo, M. Dias Branco, Troller and Ypióca.

Commerce is of great importance in the economy of Ceará, representing more than 70% of the state's GDP. The main commercial institution in the state is the Federation of Commerce of the State of Ceará (Fecommerce). Some commercial chains affiliated with Fecomercio with national prominence are Rede de Farmácias Pague Menos, Cone Pizza, Otoch and Esplanada.

In 2009, construction began on the second state supply center (Ceasa), in the Cariri region, which will complement food distribution, together with Ceasa in the Metropolitan Region of Fortaleza. In addition to Ceasa's commercial activity, all cities maintain municipal markets.

== See also ==
- Trans-Amazonian Railway
- Madeira-Mamoré Railroad
