= Brazil-Peru transcontinental railway =

Proposed railway

The Transcontinental railway Brazil–Peru (Fetab) is a proposed rail project linking Brazil and Peru, designed to increase commerce between the two nations. Also known as the Twin Ocean Railroad Connection project (Chinese: 两洋铁路), it aims to directly connect the Pacific and Atlantic Oceans via the South American Aorta Railroad.

The initiative is part of the IIRSA, envisaging a railway between Pucallpa in northern Peru and Cruzeiro do Sul in western Brazil.

== History ==
On 19 March 2008, the Peruvian Congress declared the project of national interest. Following President Ollanta Humala’s visit to China for APEC, Peru, Brazil, and China signed a memorandum to begin feasibility studies for a bi-ocean railway linking the two oceans.

In 2011, Colombian President Juan Manuel Santos announced plans with China to build an inter-ocean "Dry Canal" railway, to be financed by China Development Bank and built by China Railway Group. The project stalled without progress.

During the 6th BRICS summit in Brazil (July 2014), Xi Jinping, Brazil, and Peru announced plans to cooperate on a bi-ocean railway, establishing a working committee for design, construction, and operations. The route envisioned stretched from Rio de Janeiro to the port of Callao, Peru, but progress stalled due to Brazil’s political turmoil and wider economic stagnation.

Between May 6–14, 2015, China’s National Development and Reform Commission delegation visited Brazil and Peru to advance the project. Later that month, Chinese Premier Li Keqiang and Chilean President Michelle Bachelet also discussed related bi-ocean infrastructure.

After Luiz Inácio Lula da Silva’s return to power in 2023, the plan regained momentum. In April 2025, a Chinese delegation met with Brazilian and Peruvian officials to hold technical consultations on regional transport links.

== Planning ==
Brazilian plans envisage a route starting in southeastern Brazil, crossing the "Iron Quadrangle" mining region, agricultural Goiás, and copper-rich Andes, before joining the East-West Integration Railway and reaching the Port of Chancay in Peru. Minister Simone Tebet confirmed the revised 6,500 km alignment avoids key Amazon reserves, with 2,600 km already built. The project is valued at over US$80 billion and expected to create 800,000 direct jobs in Brazil.

Peru has shown enthusiasm. In May 2025, the government announced readiness to pursue high-level talks with China and Brazil, aiming to align strategic interests, secure financing, and promote regional integration. President Dina Boluarte highlighted benefits such as lower logistics costs, decentralization from Lima, and growth in Andean copper mining.

In July 2025, Brazil and China signed a memorandum of understanding for a five-year feasibility study of a 4,500 km route from Ilhéus, Brazil, to Chancay, Peru, via Rio Branco and the Andes. Estimated at over US$70 billion, the line could cut Asia–South America shipping times by 10–12 days compared to the Panama Canal.

== Track Gauge ==
Peru - 1435mm
Bolivia - 1000mm
Brazil - 1600mm & 1000mm
Dual Gauge 3rd rail - 1600mm & 1000mm
Argentina - 1686mm & 1000mm & 1435mm
Chile - 1686mm & 1000mm & 1435mm

== See also ==
- Central Bi-Oceanic railway
- BRICS
