= Porto de Galinhas =

Beach in state of Pernambuco, Brazil

- Beach
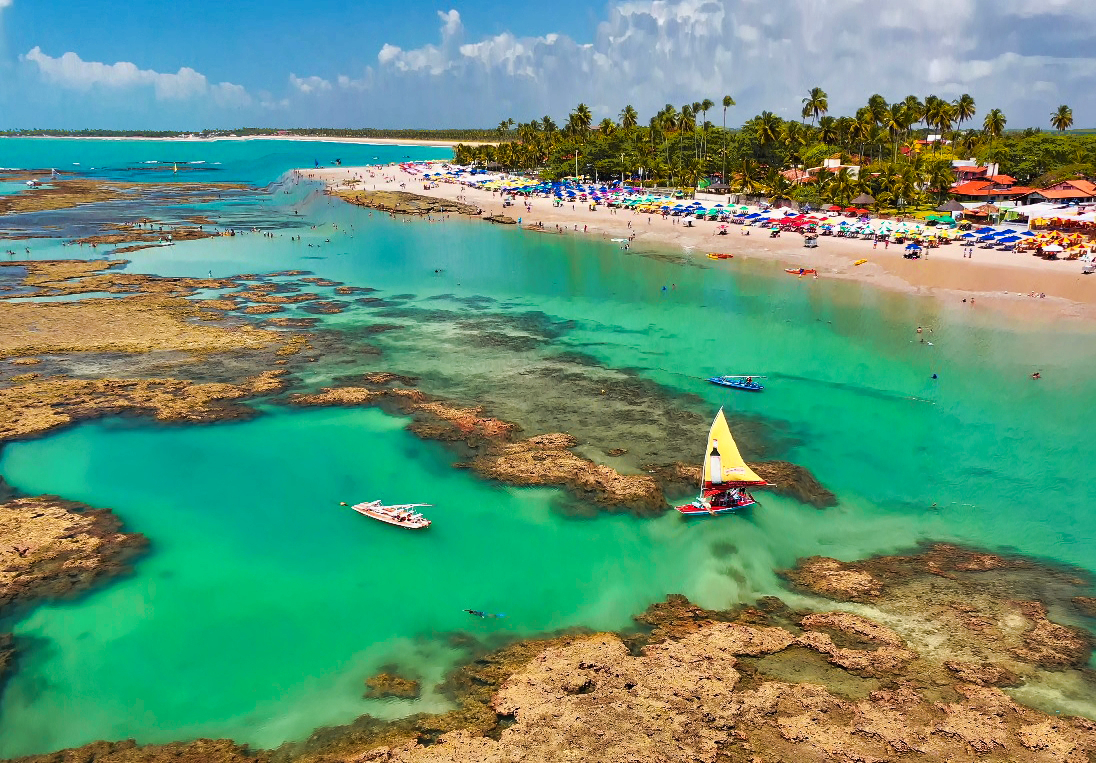
- Aerial view of the beach

- Location within Brazil
- Coordinates: 8.50111°S 35°W
- Location: Ipojuca, Pernambuco, Brazil

Porto de Galinhas.

Porto de Galinhas is a beach in the municipality of Ipojuca, Pernambuco, Brazil. Porto de Galinhas is a major tourist destination. The beach is famous for its bright-water beaches and the natural pools. It is part of the municipality of Ipojuca, and located 60 kilometers (37 mi) south of the state capital, Recife. The municipality of Ipojuca, where Porto de Galinhas lies, was established on November 12, 1895.

== Origin of name ==
According to history the town was called Porto Rico (Rich Port) until 1850 when it became a place where people traded slaves to work in the plantations of sugar cane. To evade the control of the illegal transaction, slaves were transported together with guineafowl and passwords were created by traffickers (Portuguese: "Tem galinha nova no porto"—"There are new chickens in the port"), hence the origin of the name.

== Description ==
It has been voted "Best Brazilian Beach" for the eighth time in a row by the readers of Voyage & Tourism Brazilian magazine. According to this magazine, the main reasons given are the beauty of the natural pools (the closest to the coast in all of Brazil), the ecological trails, the hotel infrastructure and the proximity to a large city and the airport in Recife.

== Gallery ==
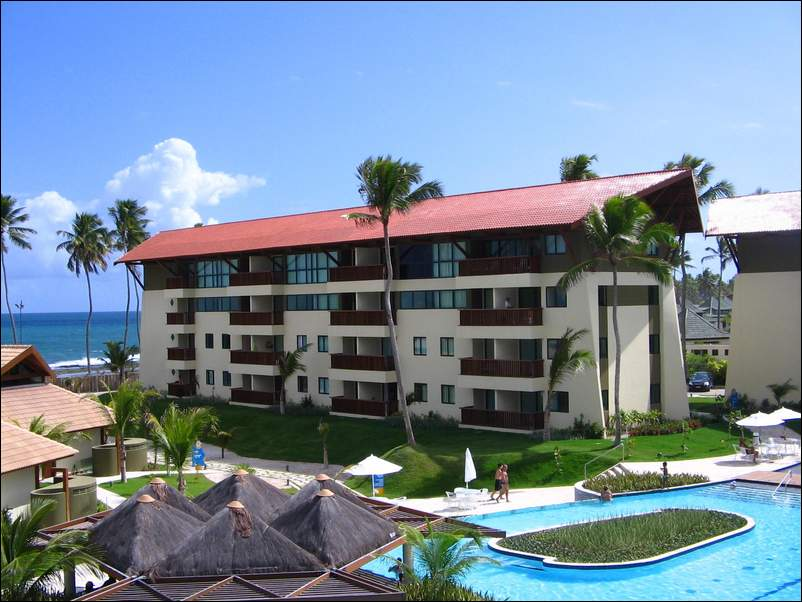
Deluxe Resort.

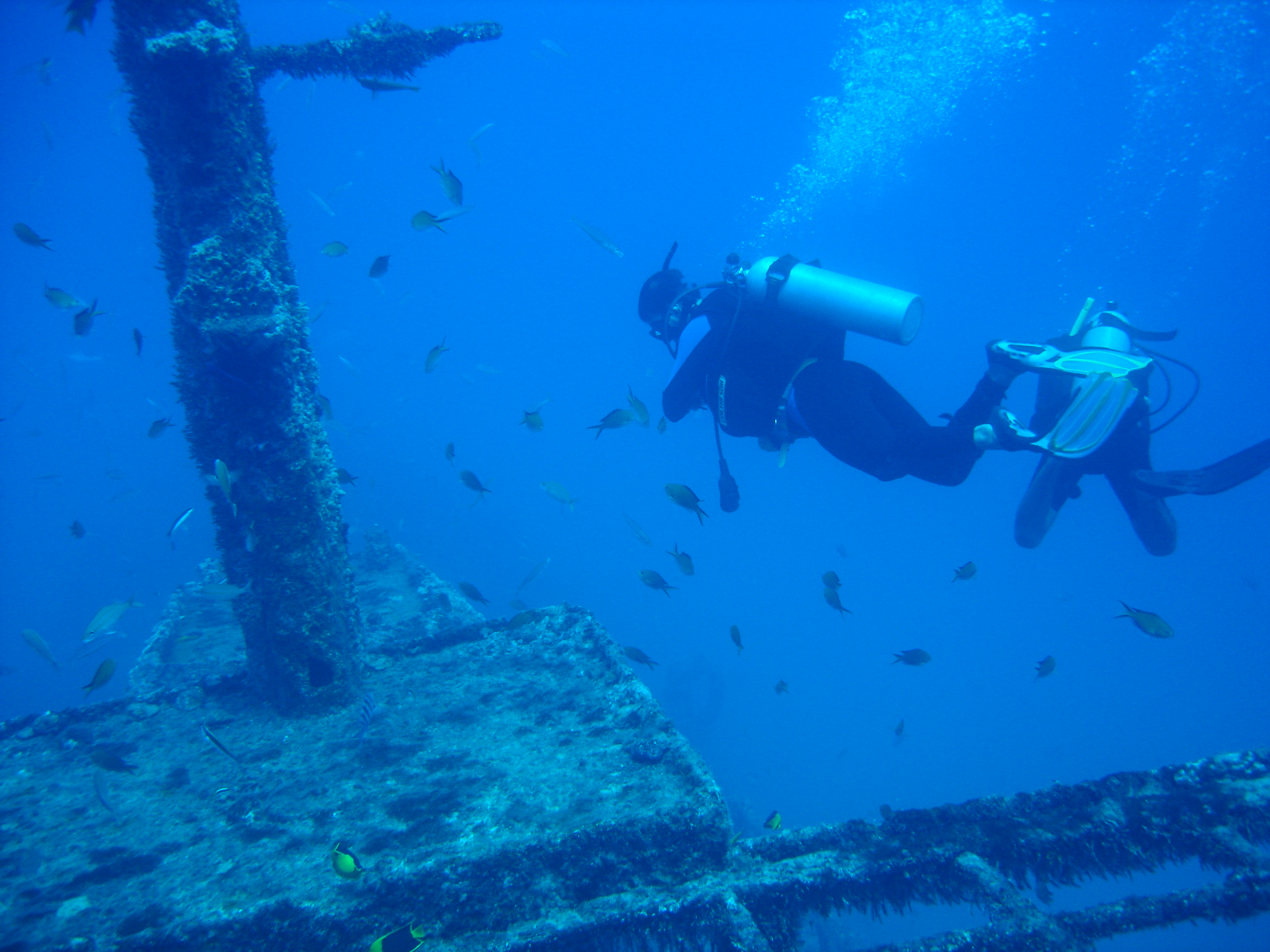
Recreational scuba divers.

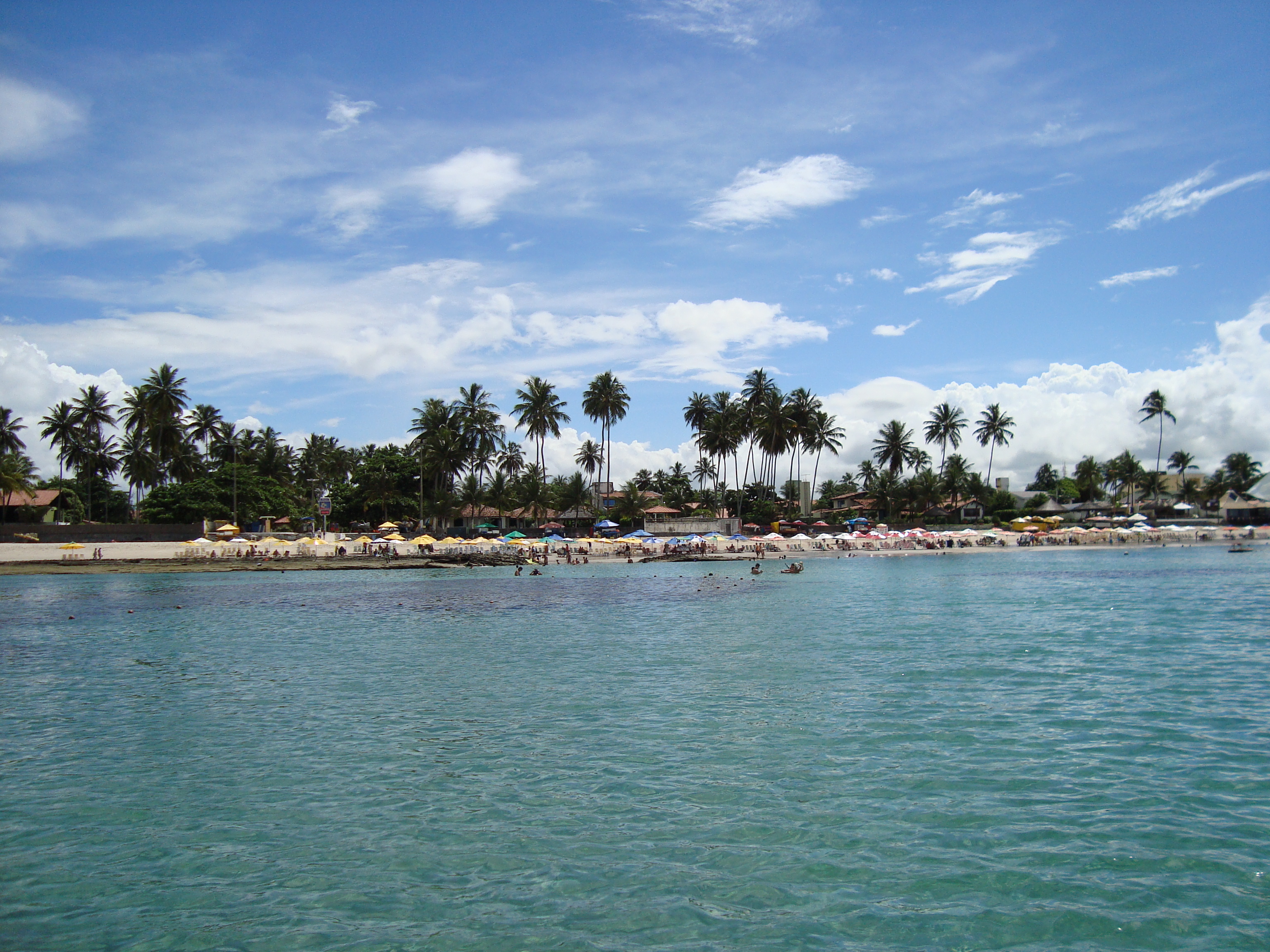
Porto de Galinhas.

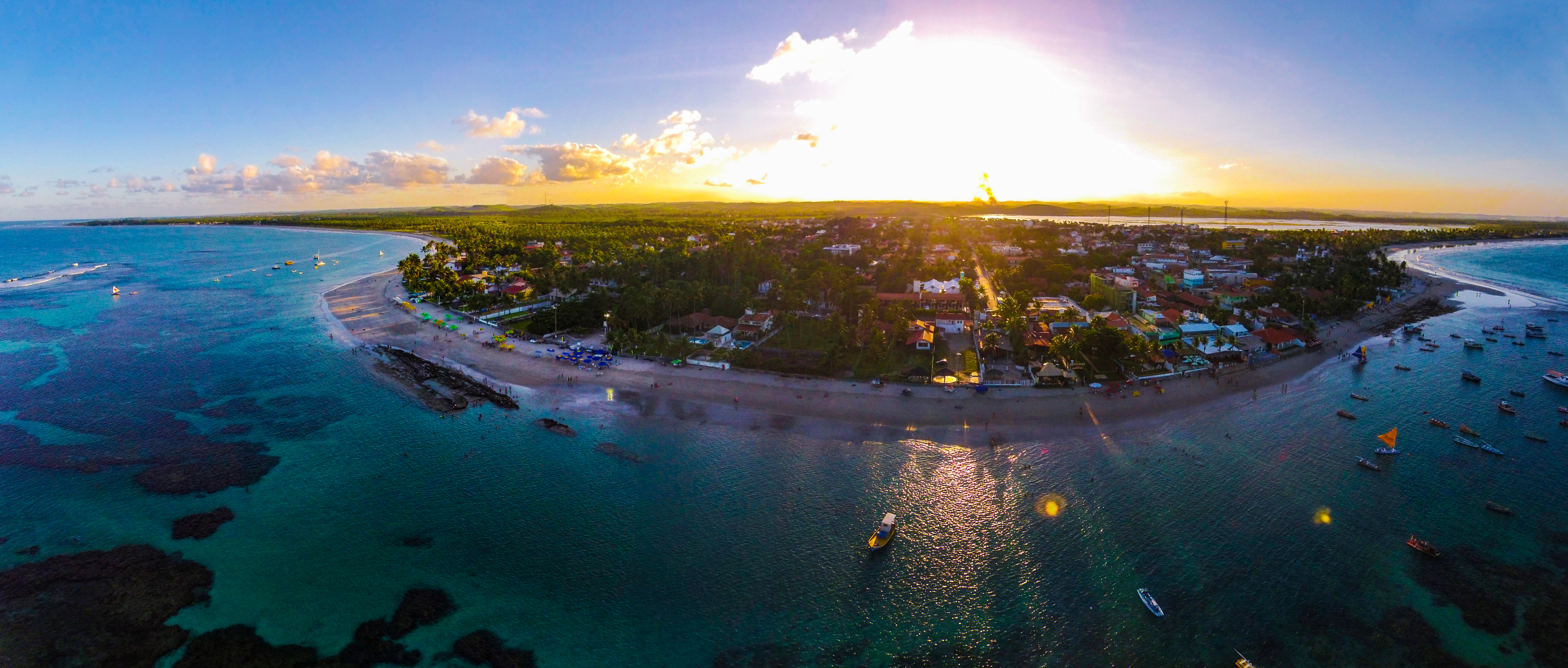
Sunset.

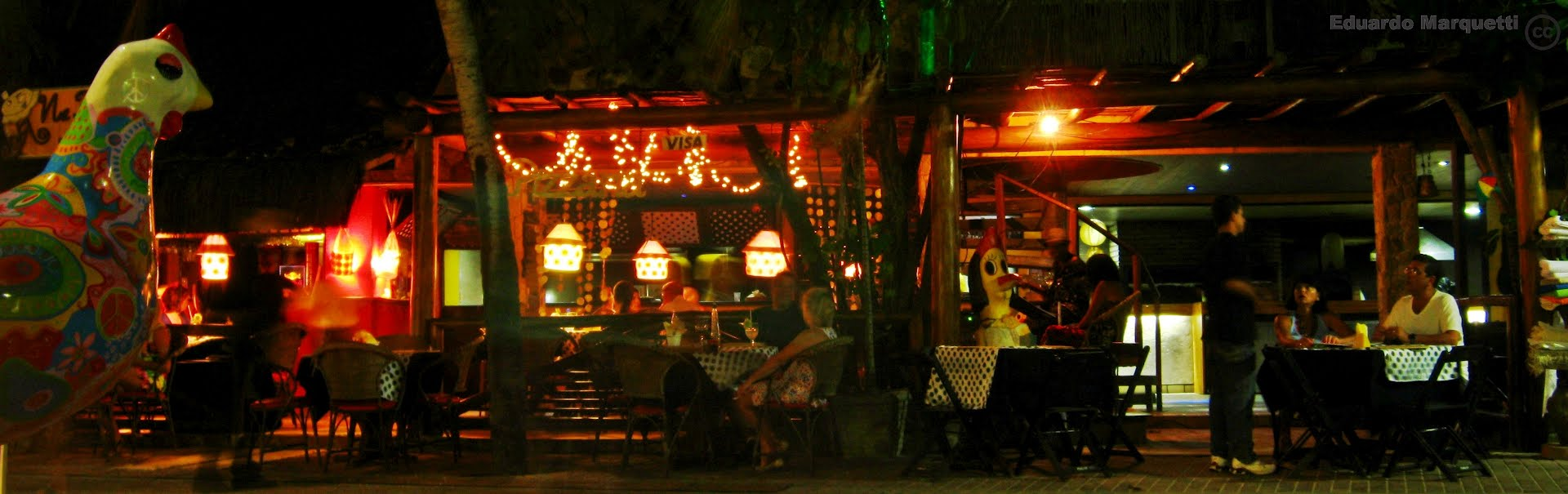
Pubs during the night.

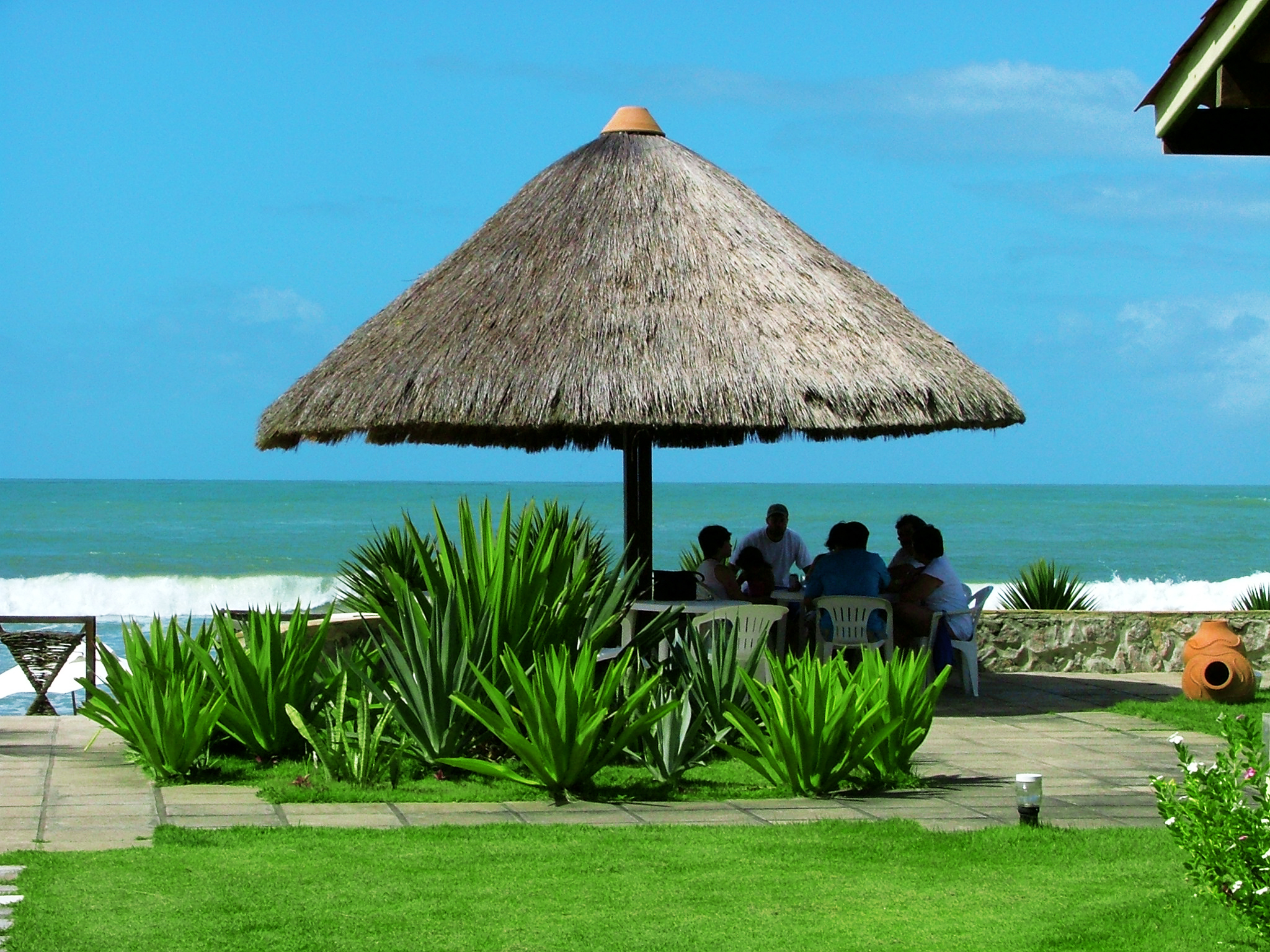
Porto de Galinhas.

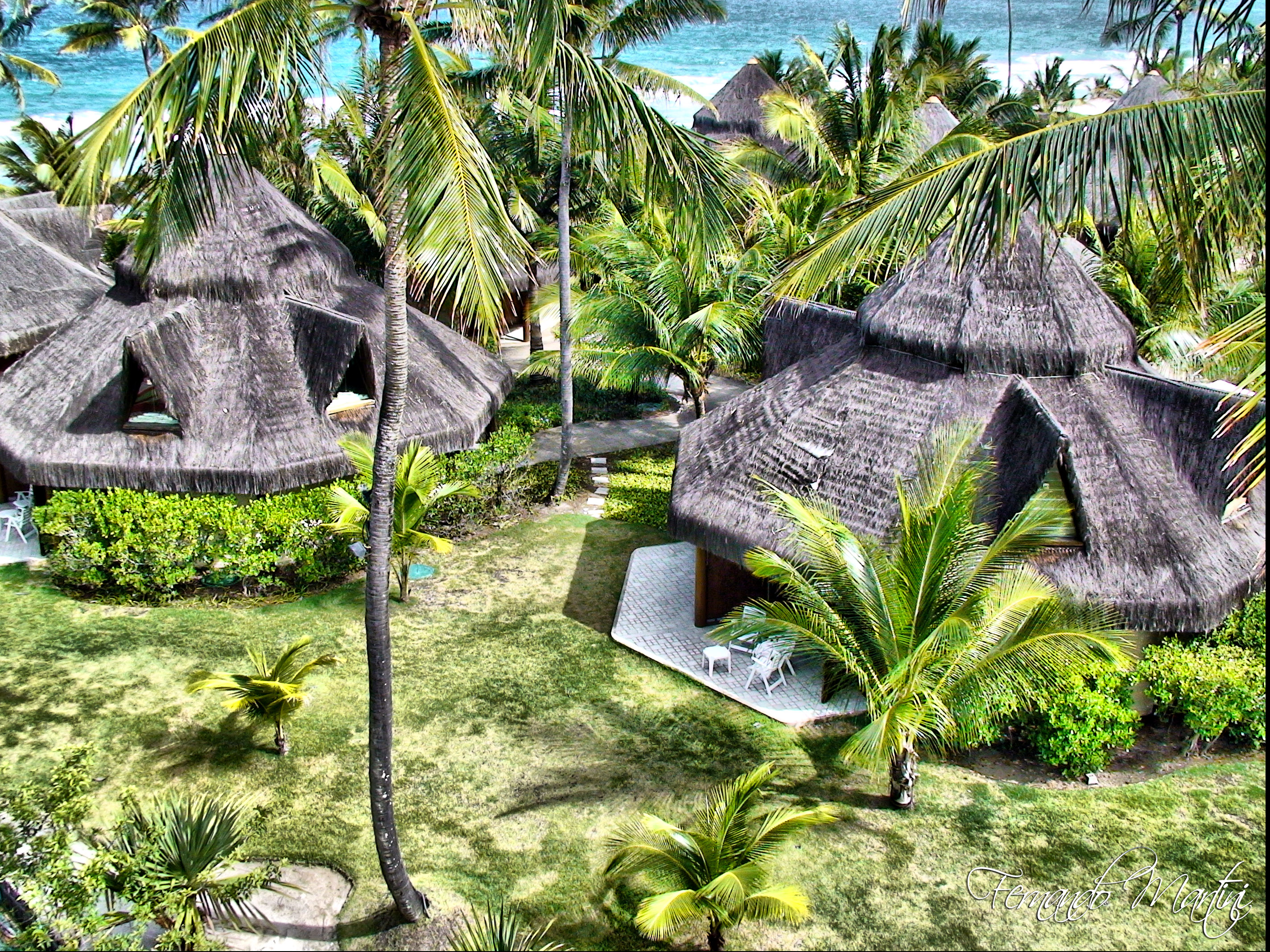
Summerville Beach Resort.

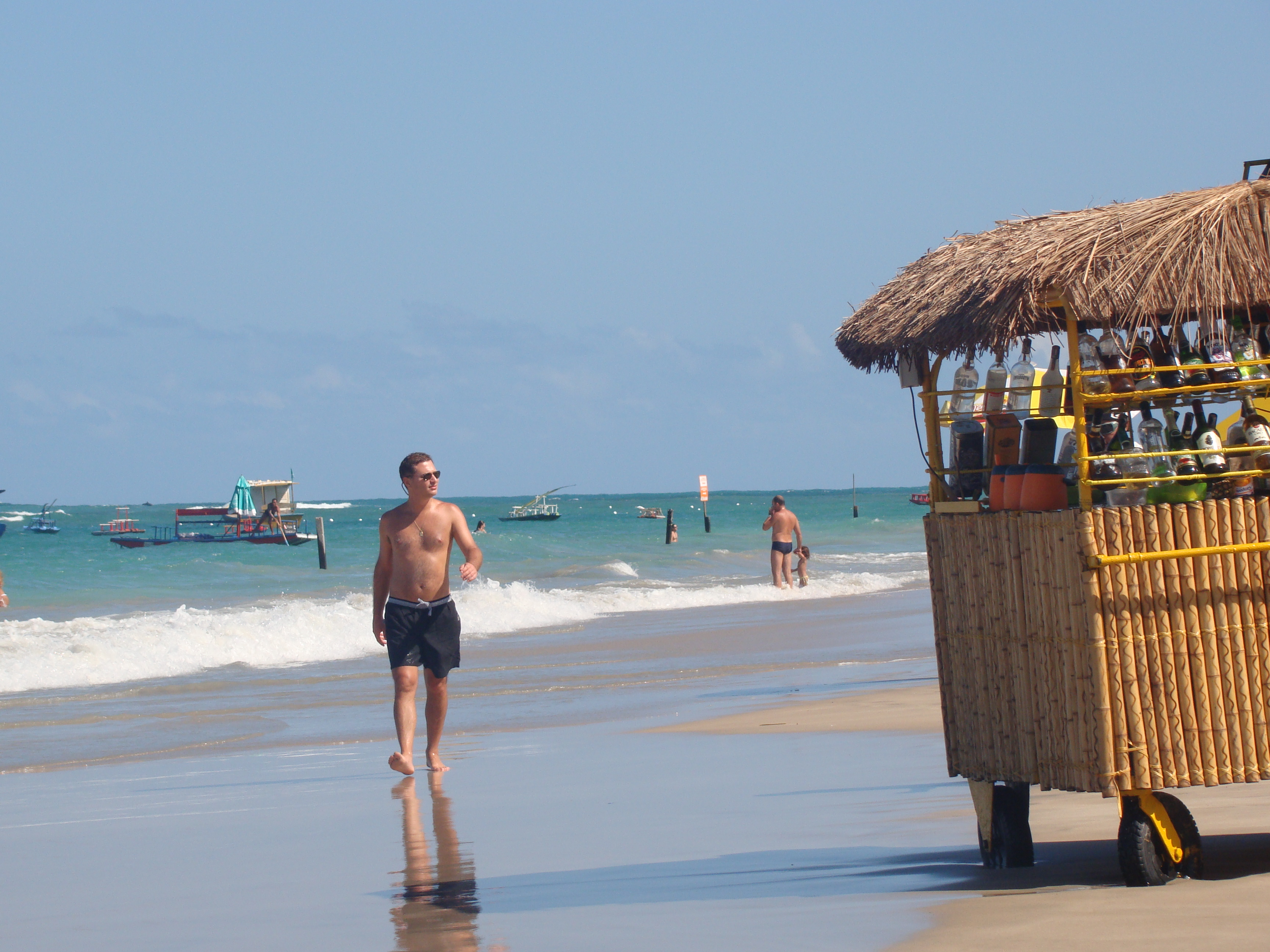
Tourists.

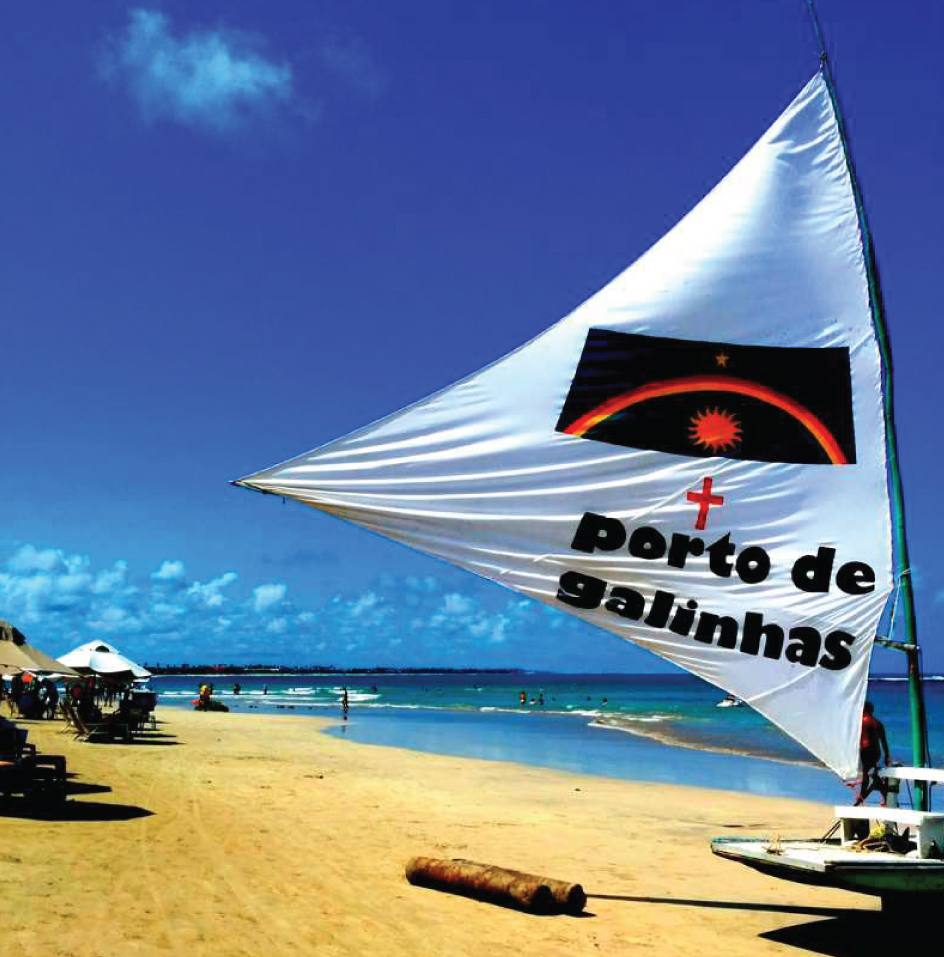
Sail boat on the beach at Porto de Galinhas

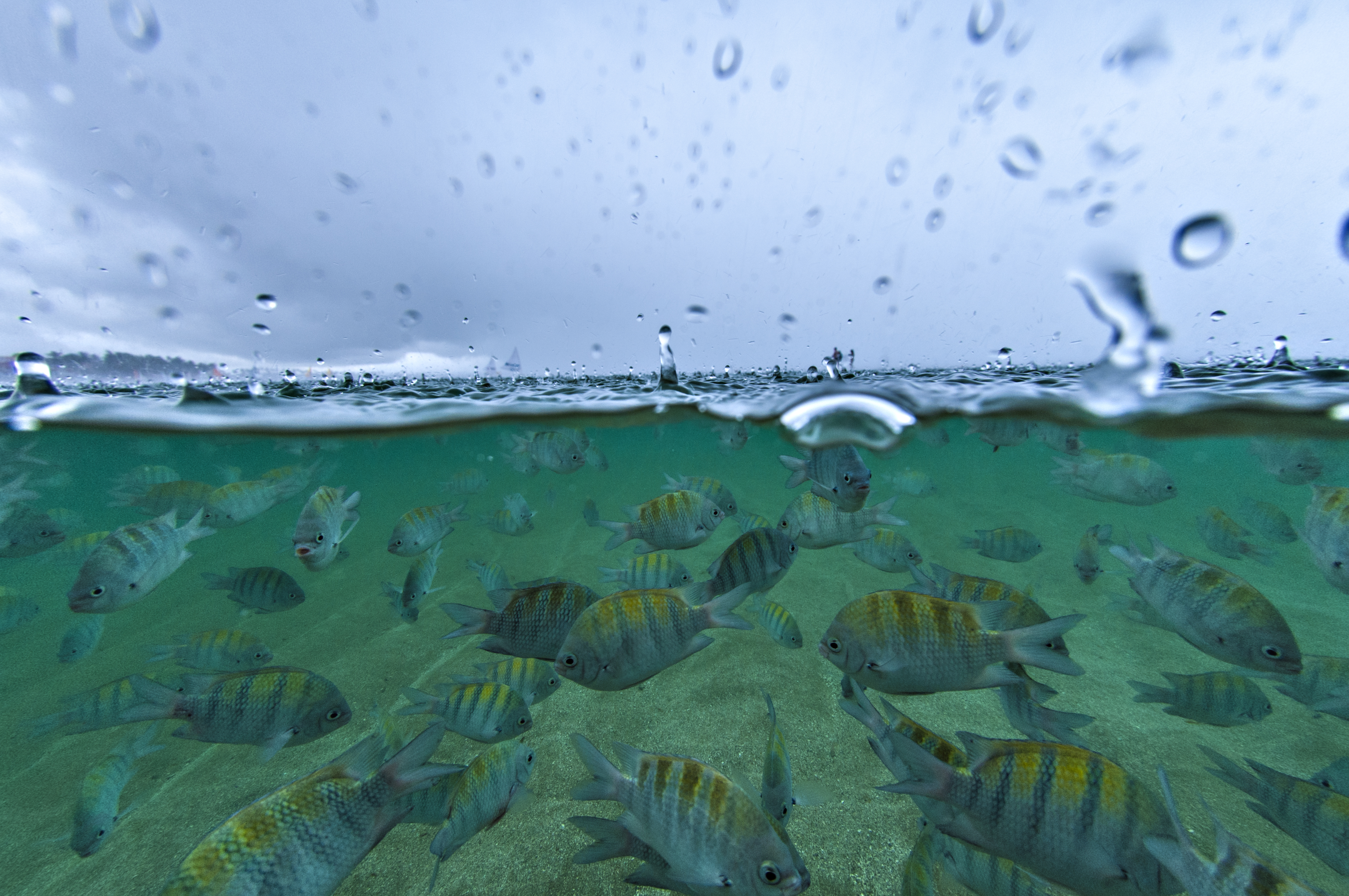
Muro Alto beach
