= Cabo de Santo Agostinho =

Municipality of Pernambuco, Brazil

- Municipality
- Municipality of Cabo de Santo Agostinho
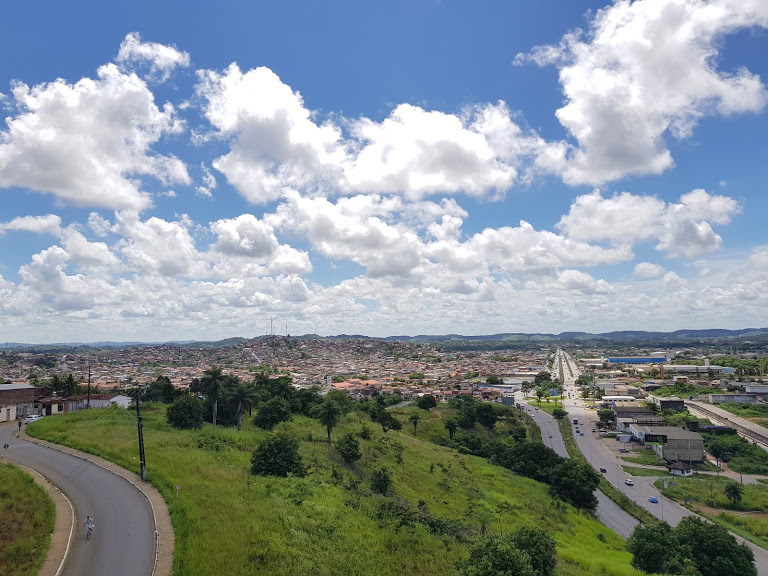
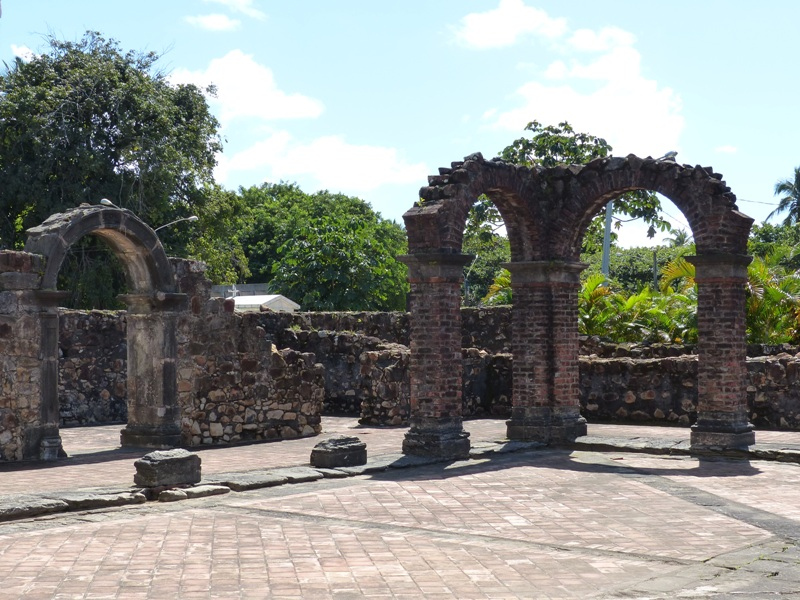
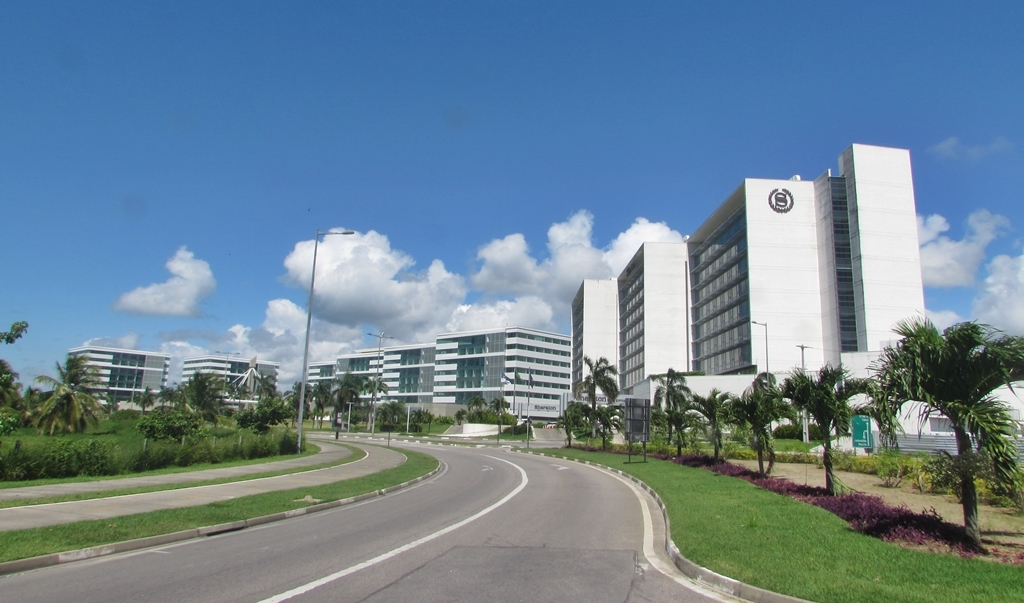
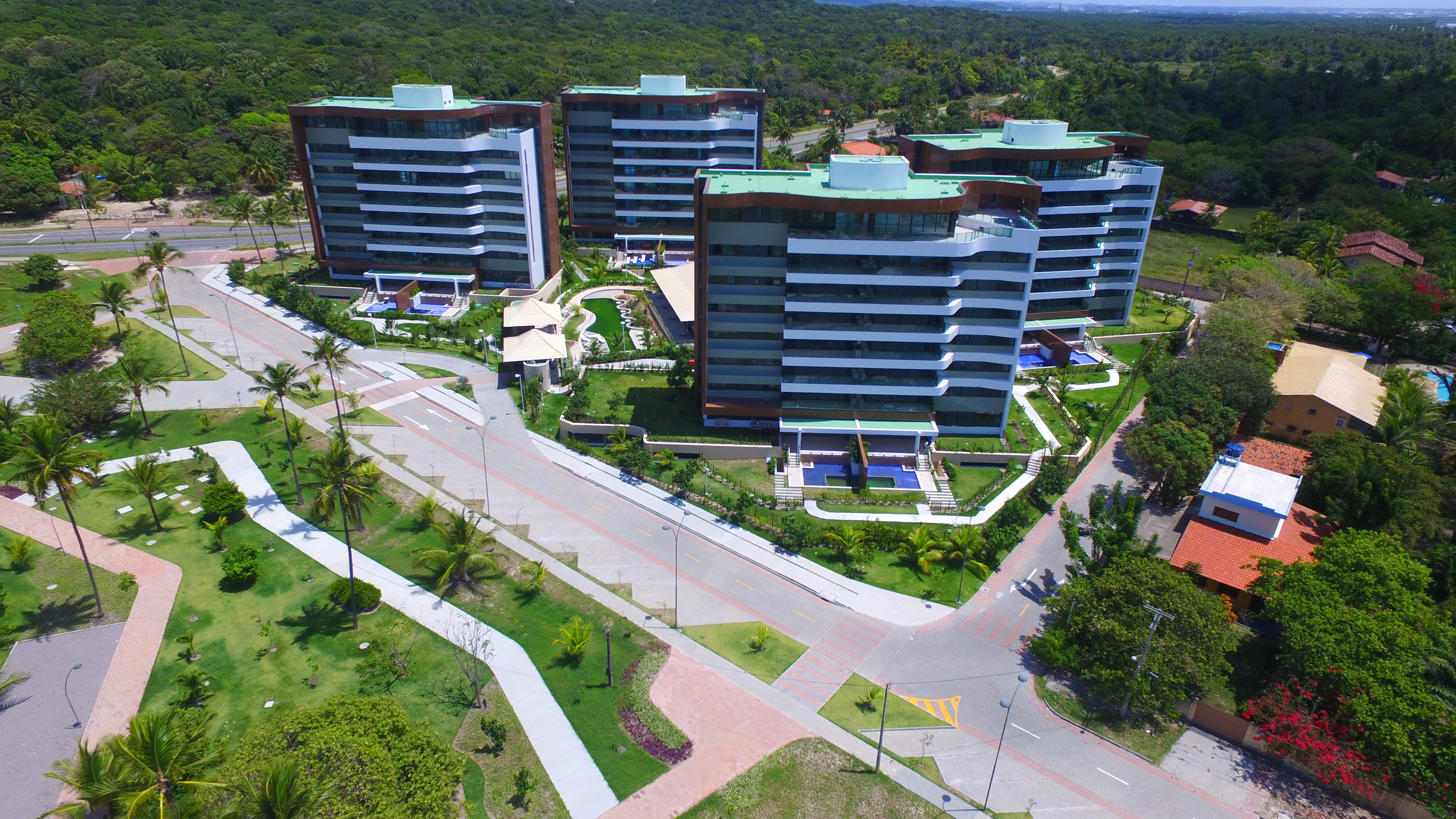
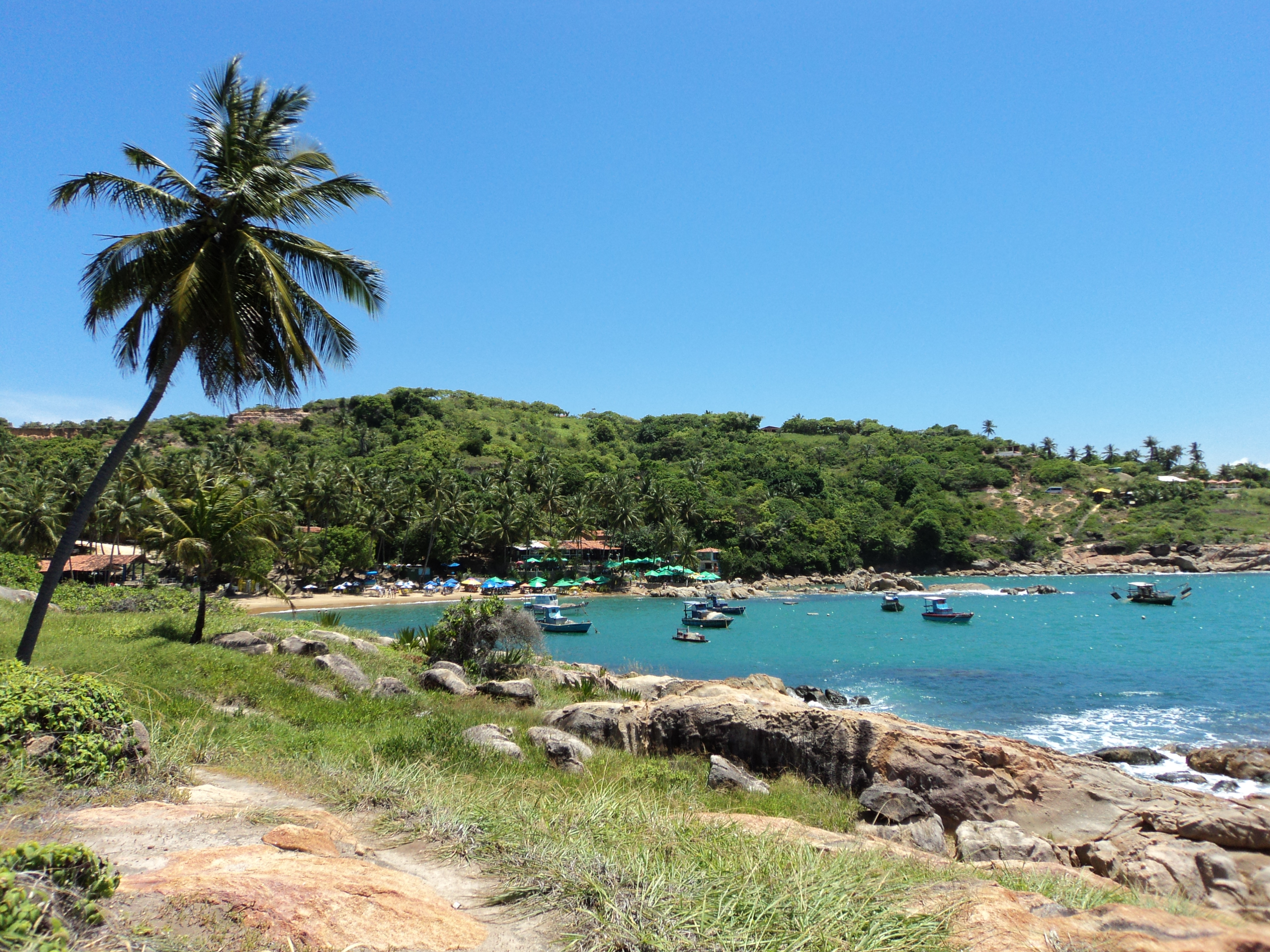
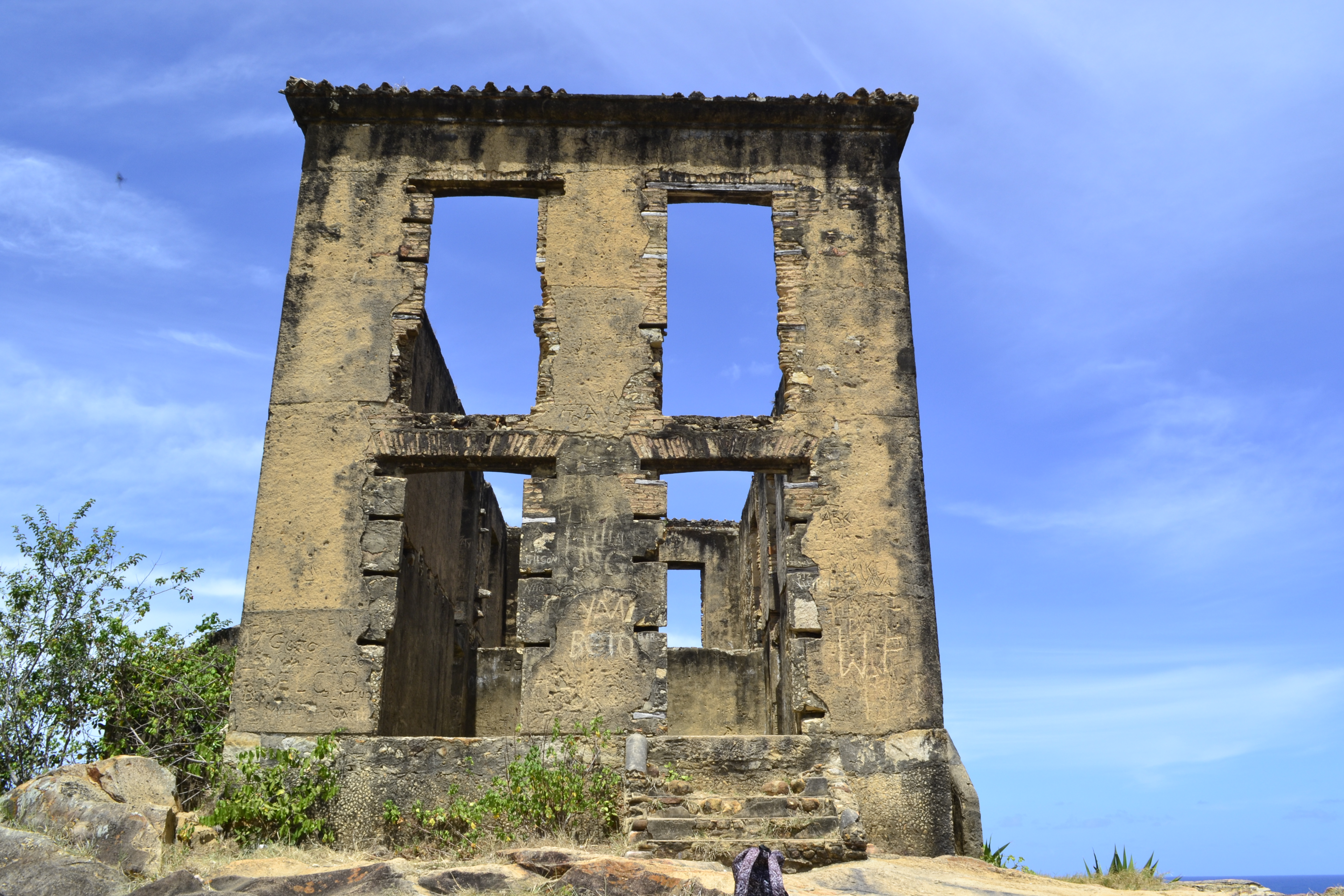

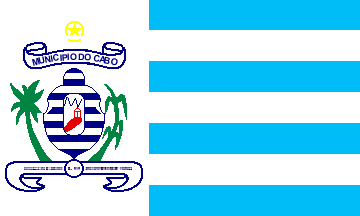
- Flag Coat of arms

- Location in the state of Pernambuco and Brazil

- Location in Brazil
- Coordinates: 8°17′23″S 35°1′48″W
- Country: Brazil
- Region: Northeast
- State: Pernambuco

Area
  - Total: 445.343 km^{2} (171.948 sq mi)
- Elevation: 29 m (95 ft)

Population (2022 Census)
  - Total: 203,440
  - Estimate (2025): 218,049
  - Density: 456.82/km^{2} (1,183.1/sq mi)
- Time zone: UTC−3 (BRT)
- HDI (2010): 0.686 – medium

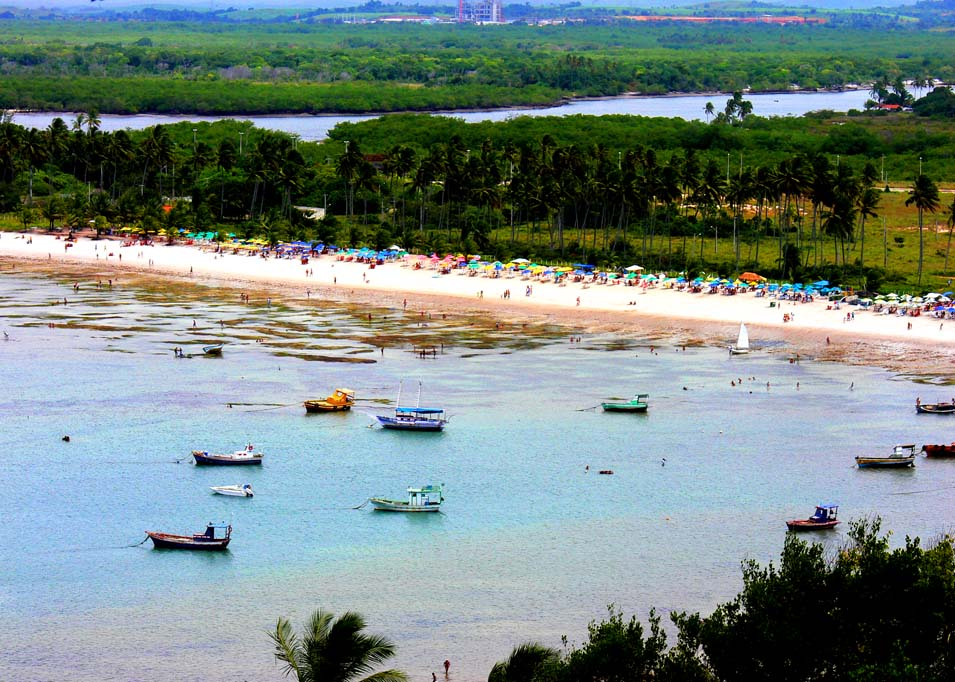
Suape beach

Cabo de Santo Agostinho (Recifense portuguese pronunciation: [ˈkɐbŭ di ˈsɐ̃tu ɐɡuʃˈtĩj̃ŭ]) (English: Cape of St. Augustine) is a 448 square kilometer sized municipality located 35 kilometers south of the city of Recife, Pernambuco, Brazil. It is believed by some historians that Vicente Yáñez Pinzón had set anchor in a bay in Cabo de Santo Agostinho on January 26, 1500, however the Portuguese discovery of Brazil was by Pedro Álvares Cabral on April 21, 1500 is officially recognized instead. Cabo de Santo Agostinho was incorporated as a town in 1811.

Cabo de Santo Agostinho has both an industrial section that is centered on the Suape port and many tropical beaches and nature reserves. The best-known beaches are Chalets, Paraíso, and Gaibu. Recanto do Domingos lies at the far south end of Pedra do Xareu beach.

Beyond its beaches, tourism in Cabo de Santo Agostinho includes historical, cultural and ecological attractions. Vila de Nazaré, located within the Armando de Holanda Cavalcanti Metropolitan Park, contains the Church of Nossa Senhora de Nazaré, the ruins of a Carmelite convent, a lighthouse and viewpoints overlooking the coast and Suape Bay. Trails through the park also provide access to the ruins of Forte Castelo do Mar and other colonial defensive structures. In the municipality's rural areas, visitors can find waterfalls, Atlantic Forest reserves, historic sugar mills and routes associated with adventure and religious tourism.

== Economy ==
The main economic activities in Cabo de Santo Agostinho are tourism, commerce and a strong and diverse general industry sector located near the Suape port.

=== Economic indicators ===
Population	GDP x(1000 R$).	GDP pc (R$)	PE	RMR
171.583	2.813.188	17.244	4.60%	7.16%

Economy by sector, 2006
Primary sector	Secondary sector	Service sector
0.57%	59.94%	39.49%

=== Suape Harbour ===
Suape port is an international port located in the city of Ipojuca in the state of Pernambuco, between the municipalities of Ipojuca and Cabo de Santo Agostinho, within the Recife metropolitan area and distant 40 km south of the capital (Recife). Suape serves ships 365 days a year without any restriction with regard to tidal schedules. It is one of the most important harbors and container terminals in northeast Brazil, playing an important role in the economy of the state of Pernambuco. In the 21st century, Suape has become the main driving force behind the economic development of Pernambuco. Its logistic advantages have attracted national and international investment on a huge scale, with over US$10 billion expected by 2010.

=== Health indicators ===
HDI (2000)	Hospitals (2007)	Hospital beds (2007)	Infant mortality per 1000 (2005)
0.707	4	281	15.9

== Beaches ==
View from Suape, looking north towards Recife

Paiva beach
A favored destination for those wishing to practice surfing surf, Paiva beach has warm, crystal clear waters, Atlantic forest vegetation and coconut trees, and small natural pools formed between the rocks. As yet it does not have a visitors service, but there is a mall, a large hotel and a whole new residential neighborhood.
Itapuama beach
This two kilometer-long beach is a much sought after site for water sports and fishing. It has hotels, bars and restaurants.
Xeréu beach
The depth of the water makes this beach suitable for diving and also for fishing. Its sand contains volcanic rocks and the bather has access to tents where snacks and seafood dishes are served.
Enseada dos Corais beach
The name means coral bay, The beach has natural reefs and gentle waves. Services are restricted to a handful of bars and restaurants.
Gaibu beach
High waves and a long 3-km stretch of sand. The beach is good for swimming but bathers should beware of deep areas. At high tides it is good for surfing. The beach has several hotels, hostels, bars, restaurants, and so forth. Together, with Porto de Galinhas and Itamaracá, this beach is one of the best to be found on the Northeast coast of Brazil.
Calhetas
Much frequented by those interested in diving, Calhetas is located between rocks and coconut trees. It has bars and restaurants and, is a hotspot for underwater fishing.
Paraiso beach
The name means heaven and the beach is tiny (a little piece of heaven) about 30 meters long, nestled between large rocks. The sea near this beach is almost completely protected from waves by reefs and this how the beach got its name.
Suape beach
Suape beach has virtually no waves and the sea is shallow. It is thus considered excellent for water sports. At low tide, there are sand banks. It is located in the Suape region near the industrial and port complex of Suape.

== See also ==
- List of municipalities in Pernambuco
- Pernambuco beaches
- Pernambuco museums
