= Ipojuca =

Municipality of Pernambuco, Brazil

- City
- City of Ipojuca
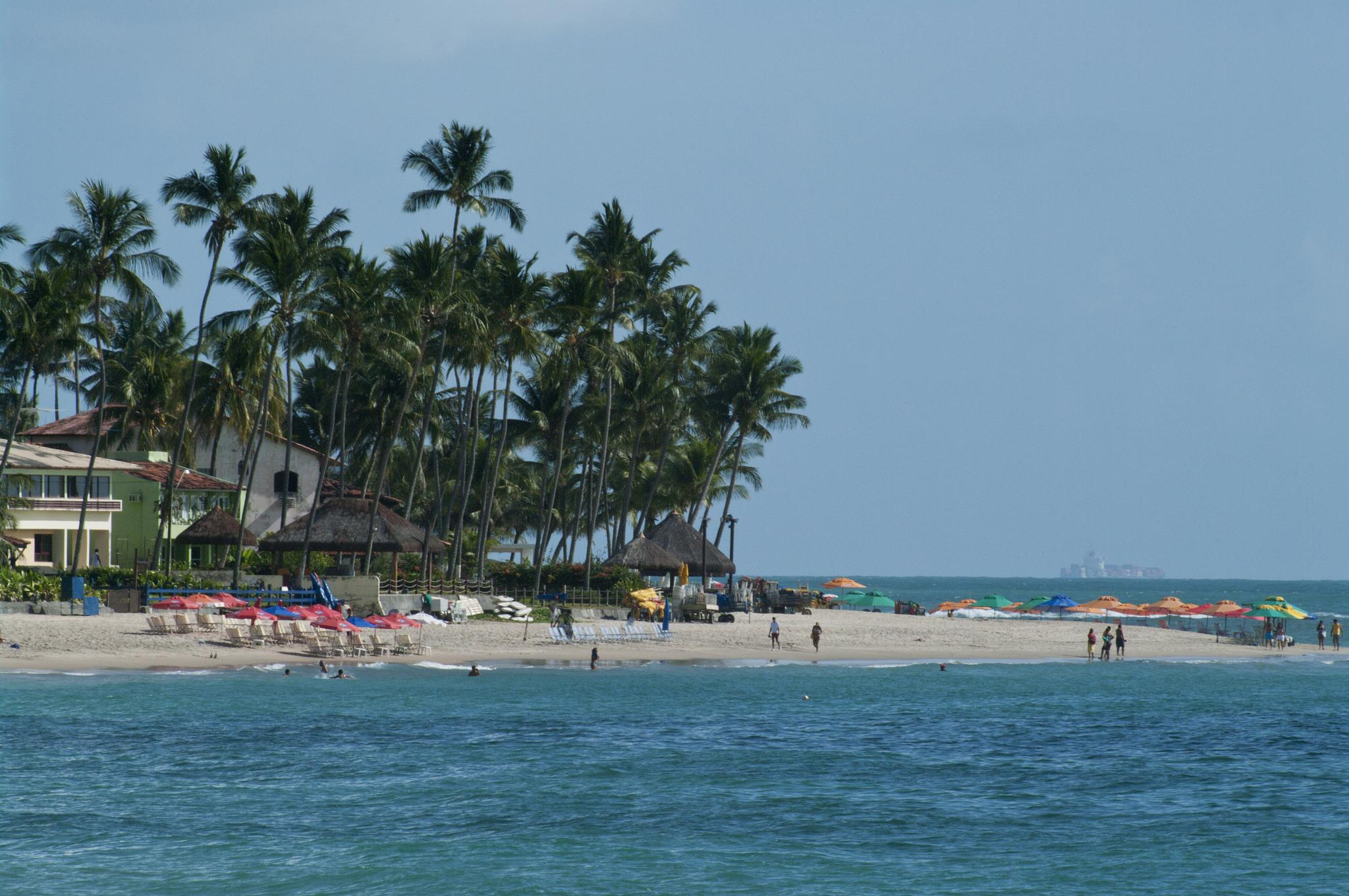

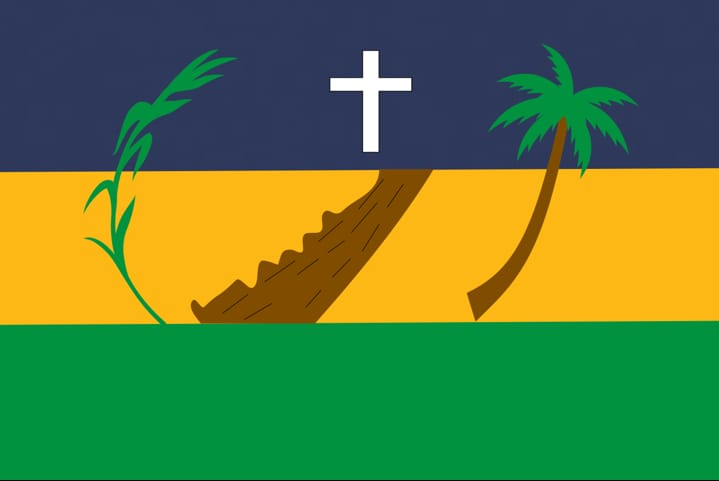
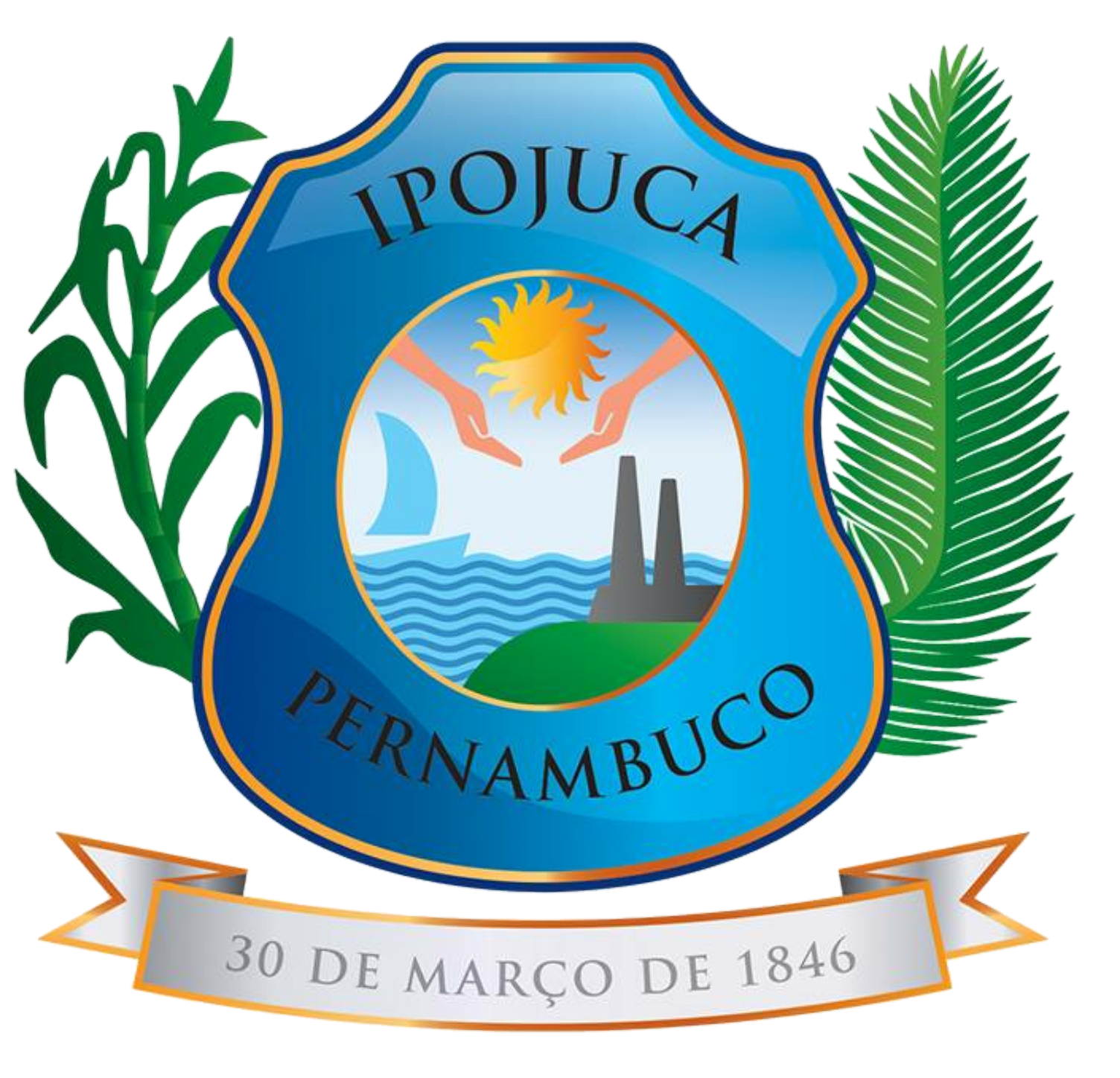
- Flag Coat of arms
- Interactive map of Ipojuca
- Coordinates: 8°24′0″S 35°3′50″W
- Country: Brazil
- Region: Northeast
- State: Pernambuco

Government
  - Mayor: Carlos Santana

Area
  - City: 527.32 km^{2} (203.60 sq mi)
- Elevation: 29 m (95 ft)

Population (2022 Census)
  - City: 98,932
  - Estimate (2025): 106,539
  - Density: 143.2/km^{2} (371/sq mi)
  - Urban: 106.000
- Time zone: UTC−3 (BRT)
- Website: www.ipojuca.pe.gov.br

Ipojuca (Recifense portuguese pronunciation: [ipoˈʒukɐ]) is a municipality in Pernambuco in eastern Brazil. As of 2025 the population according to IBGE was 106,539 and the per capita income (2007) was R$76.418 (more than $23,000 US dollars) making it one of the country's highest. The settlement dates to 1560, but the official founding date is 1861 and the community was incorporated as a town in 1864. It is famous for its beaches such as Porto de Galinhas (considered one of the best beaches in Brazil), Muro Alto, Maracaipe.

== History ==
The colonization of Ipojuca began in 1560, after the expulsion of the Caeté Indians and other tribes from the southern coast of Pernambuco. From there, the settlers could migrate to the fertile land of Ipojuca rich in massapê. The land is very suitable for the cultivation of sugar cane, which caused rapid agricultural expansion in the region. Among the pioneers were the Lacerda, Cavalcanti, and Rolim Moura families. When the Dutch invaded Pernambuco, several mills had already been established in the region. Many people in the city participated in resisting the Dutch. Under the leadership of Captain-mor Amador de Araújo, a battle broke out on July 17, 1645. The Dutch were defeated on July 23, 1645. After the victory over the Dutch, Ipojuca became one of the most important regions of the Colonial System. With two harbors- Suape and Porto de Galinhas - higher than the lowland of the northeast massapê, Ipojuca was part of the colonial triangular trade. Hens earned its name after the slaves that had arrived from Africa in that period. The Ipojuca district was established by Municipal Law Paragraph 2 - November 12, 1895. The town that emerged was centered on the village of Nossa Senhora do Ó, and then was transferred to the village of San Miguel de Ipojuca.

With State Decree No. 23 - October 4, 1890, the downtown area was restored to Nossa Senhora do Ó. There is controversy about the date Ipojuca was founded, but according to a vicar of the parish the date was around 1596.

The origin of its name comes from the Tupi guarani Iapajuque, which means Dark Water. It was also the death place of Canadian boxing champion Arturo Gatti.

== Geography ==
Ipojuca is located at 08º 23'56" south latitude and 35º 03'50" west longitude, at an altitude of 10 meters. According to the population count conducted by IBGE in 2008, the municipality has 74,059 inhabitants. It occupies an area of 527.32 square kilometres (203.60 sq mi). The vegetation consists of mangal and coconut trees on the beaches, and sugarcane in the other parts of the municipality. The hydrography consists of small coastal rivers such as: the Maracaipe and Merepe rivers.

=== Access ===
Its distance from Recife is 57 kilometres (35 mi) Highways PE-60 and BR-101 (via Cape St. Augustine) provide access to Suape, and a winding road stretches to Porto de Galinhas.

== Tourism ==
The main draw for tourism is the beach of Porto de Galinhas, selected eight times as the best beach in Brazil by Travel & Tourism magazine, whose main attractions are the natural pools visited by thousands of tourists annually. Among the many historic sights is the Convento de Santo Antonio, founded in 1606 and added to the national historical heritage in 1937. It represents a major milestone for the population of the municipality.

=== Beaches ===
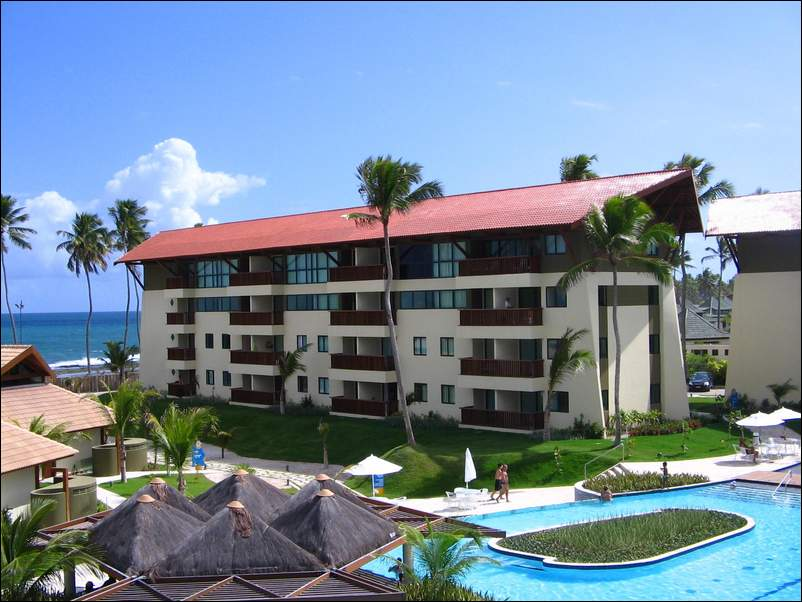
Muro Alto Resort

Camboa beach

Although deserted, this beach has along its 800 metres (870 yd) length, quiet, shallow, natural pools, coconut trees and mangal vegetation. Access to it is difficult due to the estuary of the Merepe River, but it can be reached by buggy, bike, or by walking from Cupé beach.

Muro Alto beach

As Camboa is difficult to access, many visit Muro Alto ("high wall"), which has a wall of natural reefs about 2 kilometres (1.2 mi) long, which form a huge natural pool without waves. It is suitable for canoeing and kayaking. It has hotels and "pousadas" (bed & breakfast) accommodation.

Cupé beach

This 4.5 kilometres (2.8 mi) long beach has coconut trees, numerous summer houses, luxurious hotels, pousadas, hostels, bars and restaurants. One part of its coast protected by natural reefs, has natural pools. In another section where there are no reefs, the sea is choppy with strong waves, which requires care by swimmers

Porto de Galinhas beach

Pontal de Maracaípe beach

This is a fluvial - marine beach at the estuary of the Maracaípe River. The predominant vegetation is mangue. The beach is often used for water sports such as canoeing and boat trips. Also, it is possible to find services to rent kayaks, banana boats and dune buggies.

Maracaípe beach

This beach is suitable for surfing, has deep waters, and huge waves. Maracaípe hosts a leg of the Brazilian Surf Tournament and one phase of the international surf calendar. There are coconut trees, and Mangrove vegetation.

Serrambi beach

This beach is popular for scuba diving due to the presence in its waters of several shipwrecks (or remnants of them). The vessels are from different historical periods: from the Colonial Brazil period (500 years ago) up to the major world wars. It has restaurants and bars.

== Economy ==
The main economic activities in Ipojuca are based around tourism with a large number of sophisticated internationals hotels and pousadas (traditional guest-houses), commerce, food and general industry. The tourist sector booms every summer when thousands of tourists flock to the beaches from everywhere in the world making it a major attraction of the Recife metropolitan area and the state. Ipojuca also has a very important Brazilian port - Suape port considered one of the most developed in Brazil and responsible for the boom in the industry sector in the whole of Pernambuco state.

=== Economic Indicators ===
Population	GDP x(1000 R$).	GDP pc (R$)	PE	RMR
75.512	5.354.635	76.418	8.76%	13.32%

Economy by Sector
Primary sector	Secondary sector	Service sector
0.54%	27.59%	71.87%

=== Suape Harbour ===
Suape port is a Brazilian International Port located in Ipojuca - Pernambuco, serving the municipalities of Ipojuca and Cabo de Santo Agostinho, inside the Recife metropolitan area and distant 40 kilometres (25 mi) south of the capital (Recife). Suape serves ships 365 days a year without any restrictions due to tidal schedules. Suape is one of the most important harbours and container terminals in northeast Brazil playing an important role in the economy of the state of Pernambuco. In the twenty-first century Suape has become an important contributor to Pernambuco's development. Huge national and international investments are being attracted by its logistical facilities. And by 2010 this is expected to be more than US$10 billion.

=== Health Indicators ===
HDI (2000)	Hospitals (2007)	Hospitals beds (2007)	Children's Mortality every 1000 (2005)
0.658	2	28	14.9

== See also ==
- List of municipalities in Pernambuco
