= Central Bi-Oceanic railway =

Rail project between Brazil, Paraguay, Argentina, and Chile

The Bioceanic Corridor (Portuguese: Corredor Bioceânico; Spanish: Corredor Bioceánico) is a rail project between Brazil, Paraguay, Argentina, and Chile. It is intended to join the port of Santos, Brazil, on the coast of the Atlantic Ocean, with the ports of Iquique and Antofagasta, Chile, on the coast of the Pacific Ocean.

== Project ==
In his trip to China in 2013, Bolivian president Evo Morales discussed with Chinese leader Xi Jinping the possibility of building a railway to link the Atlantic with the Pacific through Brazil and Peru. The Chinese president requested a study of feasibility by 2014.

The Spanish narrow-gauge rail company FEVE was awarded a contract by the Bolivian government to prepare a technical feasibility study. The first studies were prepared by Spanish, French, and Bolivian consultants and were to be delivered by June 2014.

In August 2014, a mission from Bolivia sought financing from the Chinese government.

The summit of the Union of South American Nations in December 2014 prioritised the project, along with seven other regional integration endeavors.

The project contemplated four baseline studies: the basic engineering design, the market study, the strategic study, and the environmental study. The studies were scheduled for completion by 31 December 2014.

Then-Bolivian minister of public works, services and housing, Vladimir Sánchez, stated that the first phase was to build the railroad; the second was to electrify it, and the third was to have a double-track railroad.

The project aims for 95% of trade from the south and north of Peru as well as integration with Brazil.

== Bi-Oceanic Corridor ==
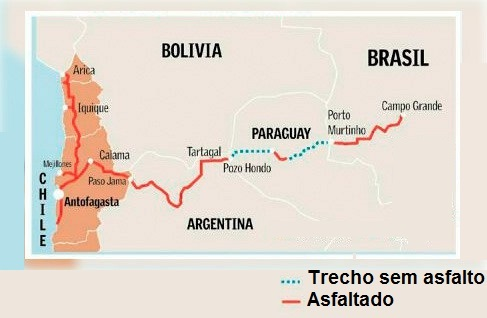
The planned road between Brazil, Paraguay, Argentina, and Chile

In August 2017, a second expedition through parts of the route that have been completed took place, departing from Campo Grande and covering its entire length to the Chilean ports of Iquique and Antofagasta, the final stop. The route passed through four countries: Brazil, Paraguay, Argentina, and Chile. The first expedition traveled through Bolivia, to Chilean ports. The corridor was to be completed in 2022. Most of the work is to be carried out by Paraguay, which will need to pave more than 600 km of its highways, at the time still unpaved. The route is set to cover 2,400 km, between Campo Grande and Antofagasta.

The project is intended to reduce travel time for exports from the midwest of Brazil to Asia and Oceania (China, Japan, India, Australia) by up to two weeks. With the route, part of Brazilian production, which currently leaves the country through the ports of Santos and Paranaguá, will be exported by Chilean ports at lower prices.

In February 2022, Paraguay inaugurated 275 km of National Route 15 (about half of the route), connecting Carmelo Peralta (Alto Paraguay), on the border with Brazil, to Loma Plata (Boquerón), in the center of the country.

== See also ==
- Brazil–Peru railway
- Interoceanic Highway
- Rail transport in Bolivia
- Rail transport in Brazil
