= Suape Port =

Port in Brazil

Port of Suape
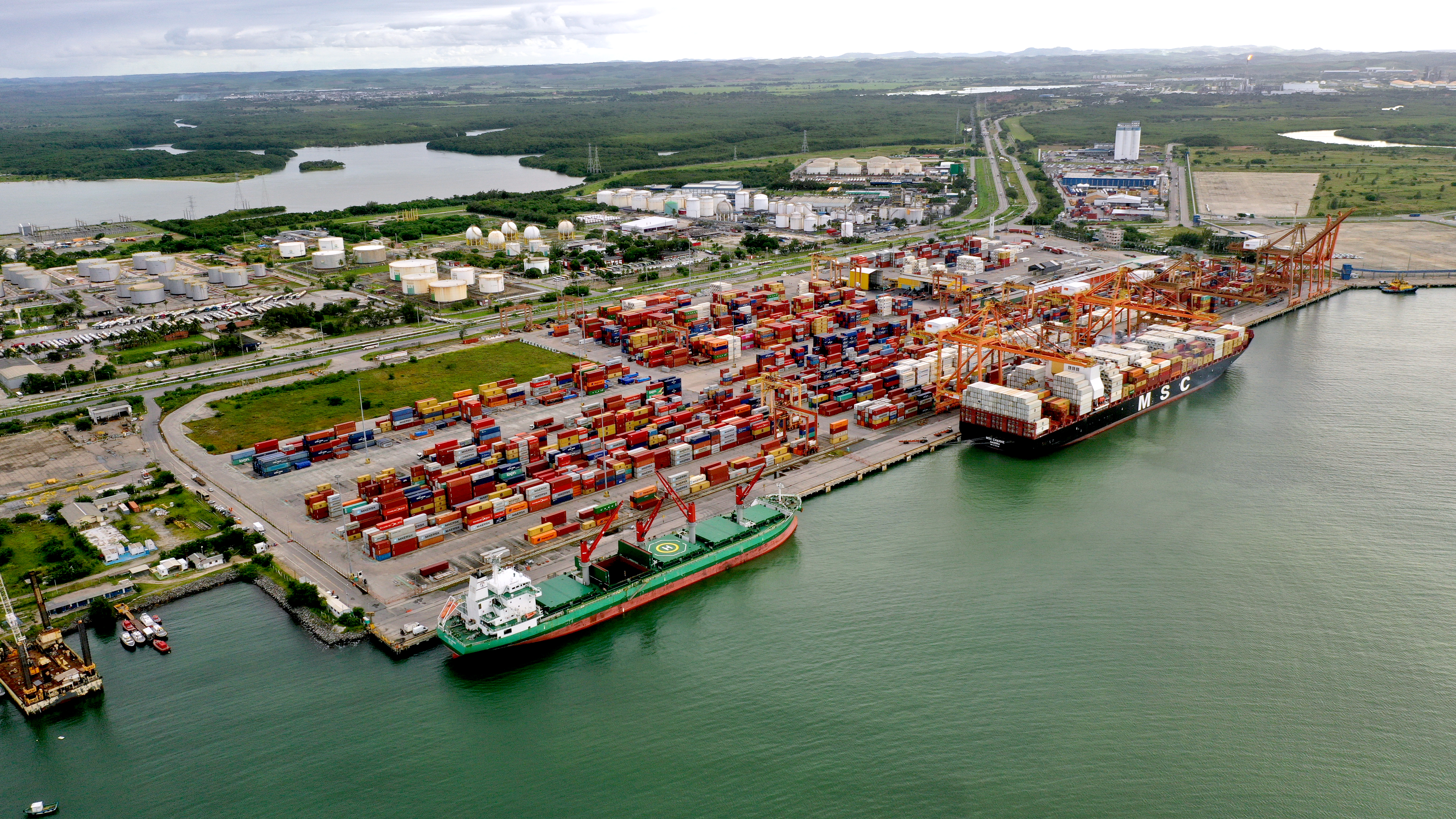
- Port of Suape industrial complex
- Interactive map of Port of Suape

Location
- Country: Brazil
- Location: Ipojuca and Cabo de Santo Agostinho, Pernambuco
- Coordinates: 8°23′56″S 34°57′44″W

Details
- Opened: 1983
- Owned by: APM Terminals
- Type of harbour: Seaport

Statistics
- Annual cargo tonnage: 23.6 million tonnes (2017)

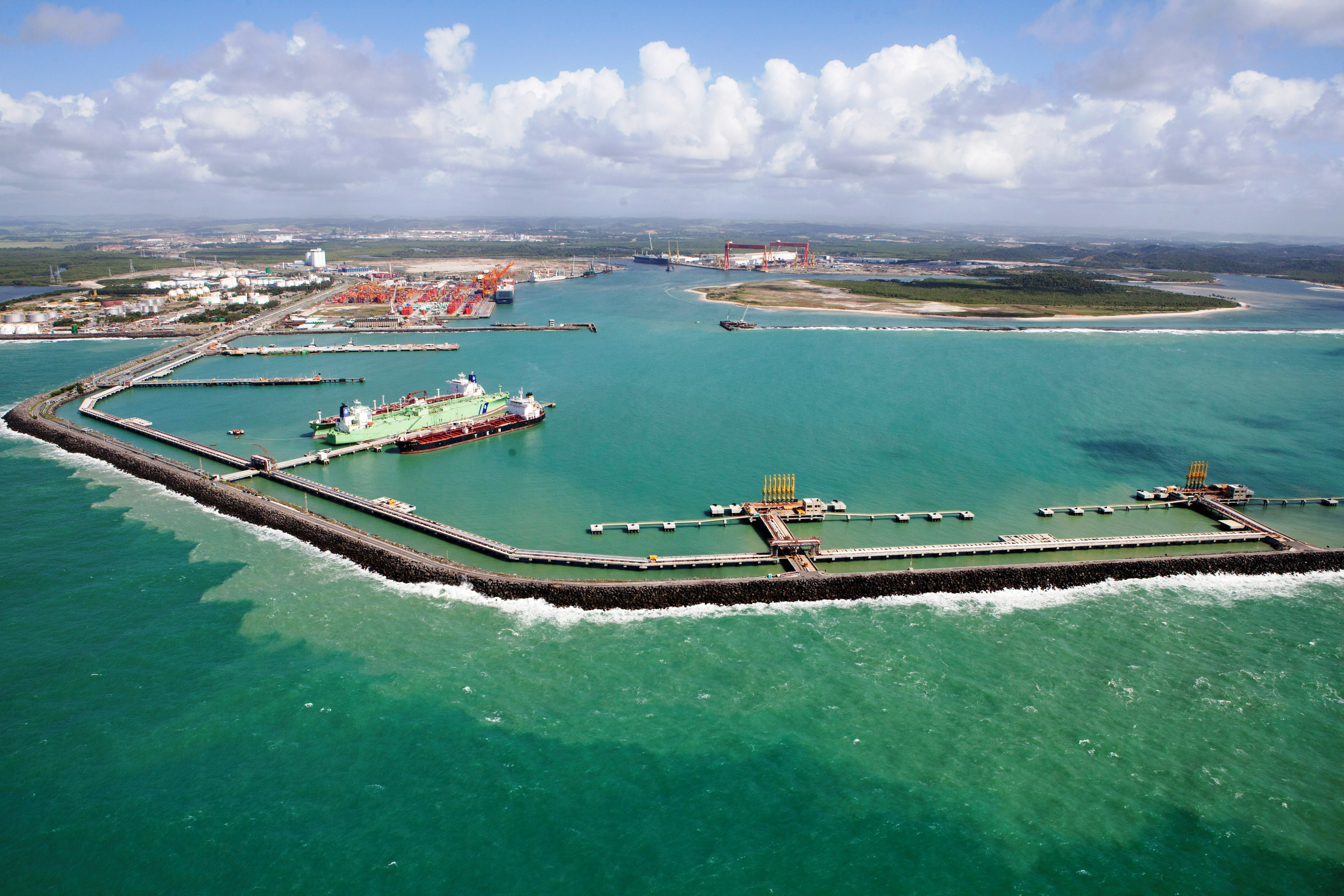
Suape, 2012

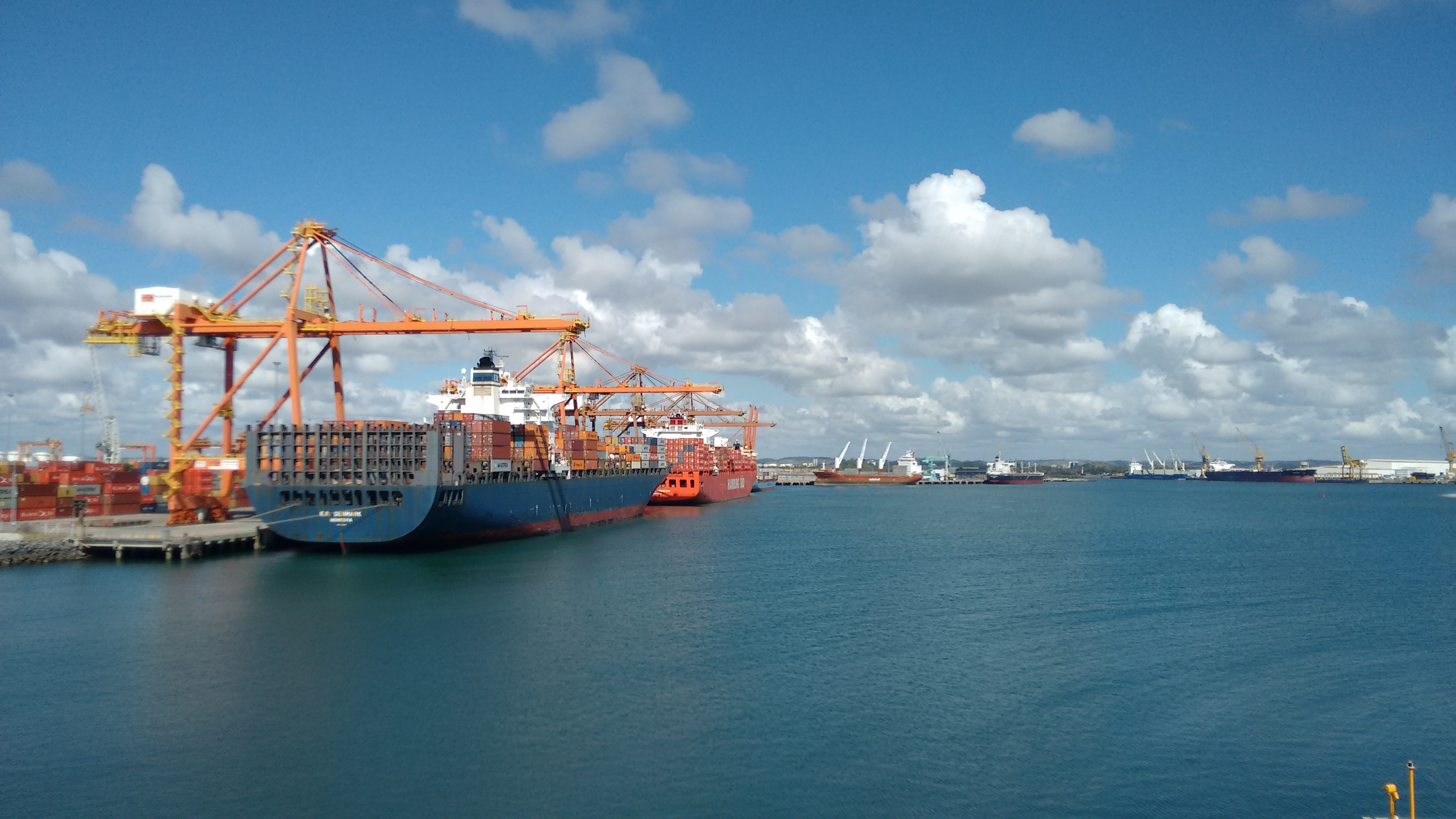
Inland Port (Suape Dock)

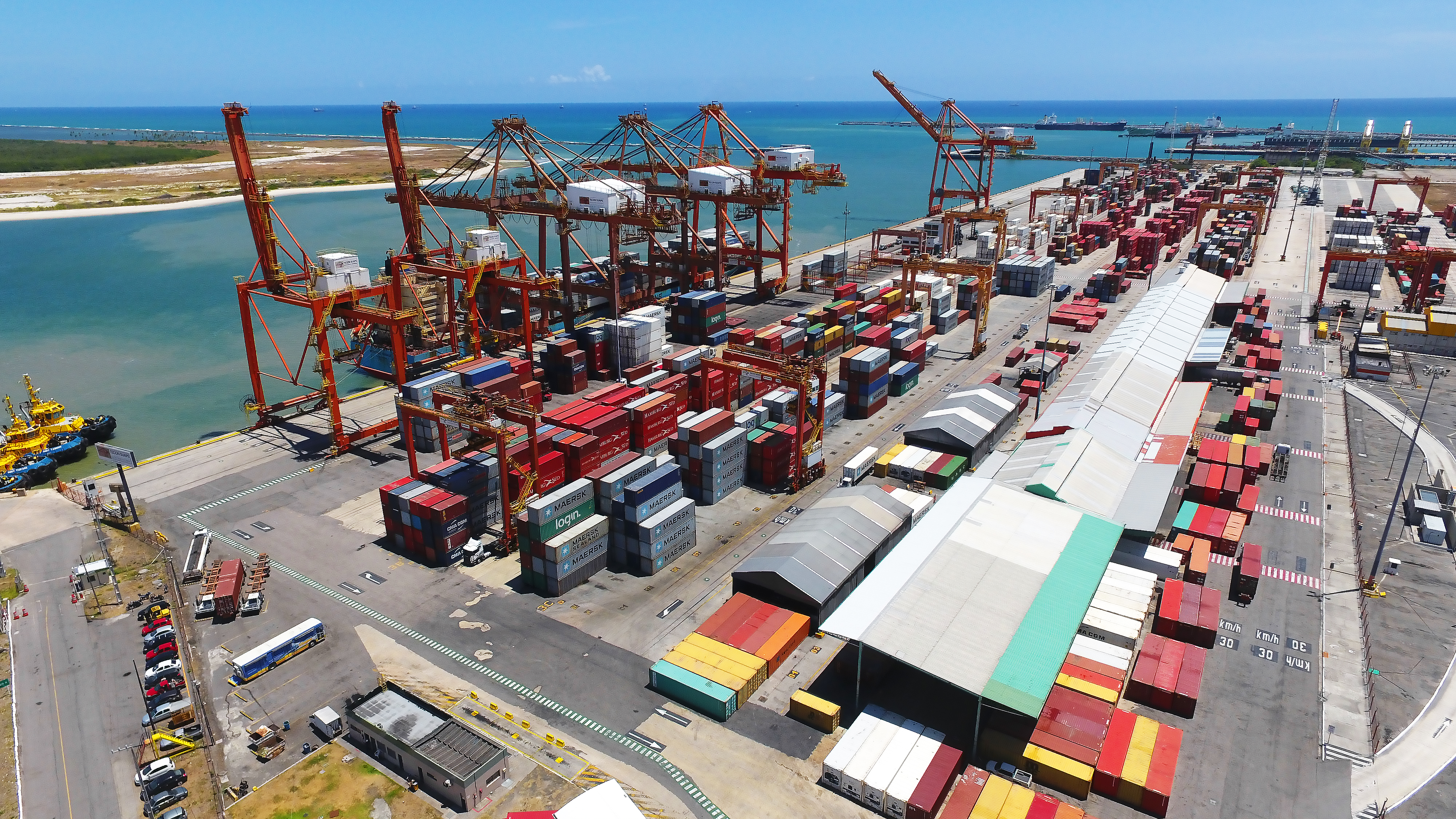
TECON (Container Terminal)

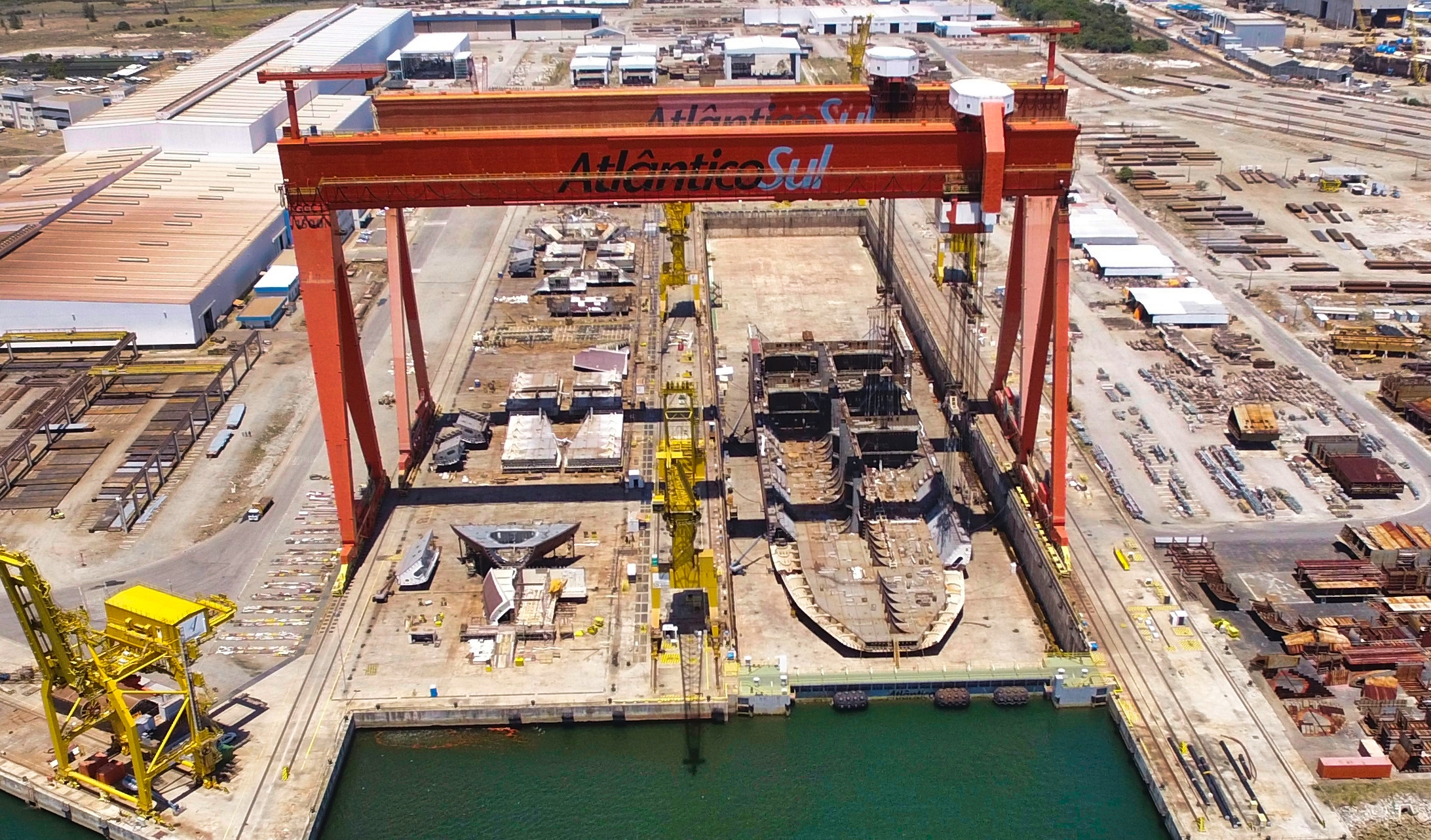
The Atlântico Sul Shipyard has a structure 400 meters long, 73 meters wide and 12 meters deep.

Suape Port is one of the main ports of Brazil and Latin America. It's located in the city of Ipojuca and Cabo de Santo Agostinho, in the state of Pernambuco. It's the largest public port in the Northeast Region and occupies the fifth position in the national ranking.

The port is located inside the Recife Metropolitan Area, 40 km south of the city. Suape is a non-tidal port that services ships 365 days a year. It plays an important role in the economy of the state of Pernambuco. In the 21st century Suape became Pernambuco's main focus for development.

== Origins ==
The port was designed by the then Governor Francisco de Moura. Its name originates from Suape beach, the most southern beach of Cabo de Santo Agostinho. However, the port is in the municipality of Ipojuca. Its design is based on the Port-Industry integrated system. The port was designed for the transportation of fuels and bulk cereals, replacing the Recife Port. On November 7, 1978, a new state law created the Suape Industrial Port Complex to manage the project and the port. Today, it is one of the largest ports in Brazil and has been considered one of the most technologically advanced. It serves the state of Pernambuco and large parts of Alagoas and Paraíba states.

== Port structure ==
Suape Port serves ships 365 days a year without regard to tide schedules. To assist in docking, the port offers a monitoring system and laser ship docking system that enables effective, secure control. The port moved over 8.4 million tonnes in 2008 (has increased 7 times since 1992). The liquid transfer (petroleum by-products, chemical products, ethanol, vegetable oils, etc.) constituted more than 80% of the total amount moved. The port can serve ships of up to 170,000 DWT and operational draft of 15.5 m in the internal port and up to 20 m in the external port. With 27 km^{2} of backport, the port can serve large ships. The access canal has a 5,000 m extension, which measures 300 m wide and 15.5 m deep. More than 96 companies are installed or are becoming installed in Suape. These include a Petrobras refinery, Atlântico Sul (largest shipbuilder in South America) and a large petrochemical company.

In 2018, Suape presented a total of 23.6 million tons of transported products, being responsible for the largest national movement of liquid bulk (17.5 million tons) and cabotage (15.3 million tons). Petroleum derivatives were the ones that had the greatest impact on the management of the port, due to the need to relocate the Abreu e Lima Refinery. Other outstanding products in the port of Suape are exports of automobiles, iron ore, soybeans and sugar, and the export of containers.

The port equipment is being converted to electric.

== Infrastructure ==
The Port is accessed by federal road BR-101 and the state road PE 060. At 35 kilometres (22 mi) northwest it interconnects with BR-232, a federal highway that crosses the state in the east-west direction.

The Guararapes International Airport from Recife, is 25 kilometres (16 mi) north. The Maceió airport is 210 kilometres (130 mi) south, João Pessoa airport is 160 kilometres (99 mi) north, near state airports such as Caruaru (160 kilometres (99 mi) W), and Petrolina (725 kilometres (450 mi) W).

The Transnordestina (main goods NE train line with 1,800 km/1,115 mi extent) crosses 3 and connects 7 States (34 cities just in Pernambuco). The city of Cabo de Santo Agostinho operates a diesel train called the South Train, which connects directly with Recife for passenger service.

== Logistics center ==
Recife is one of Brazil's biggest logistics centers, combining Suape, the international airport and a central location in Brazil's northeastern region. Logistics, communications and financial sector employees make up 4% of the Recife workforce and over 9% in the Metropolitan Area.

== Sharks ==
Port construction disturbed shark habitat. They were forced to move north to the coastal region of Recife city. The first verified shark attack took place in 1992. Since then, 60 people have been attacked by sharks, including 24 fatalities, mostly surfers who venture beyond the barrier reef that protects Recife beaches.

== See also ==
- Recife port
