= Center for Instruction and Operations in the Caatinga =

Brazilian Army training center

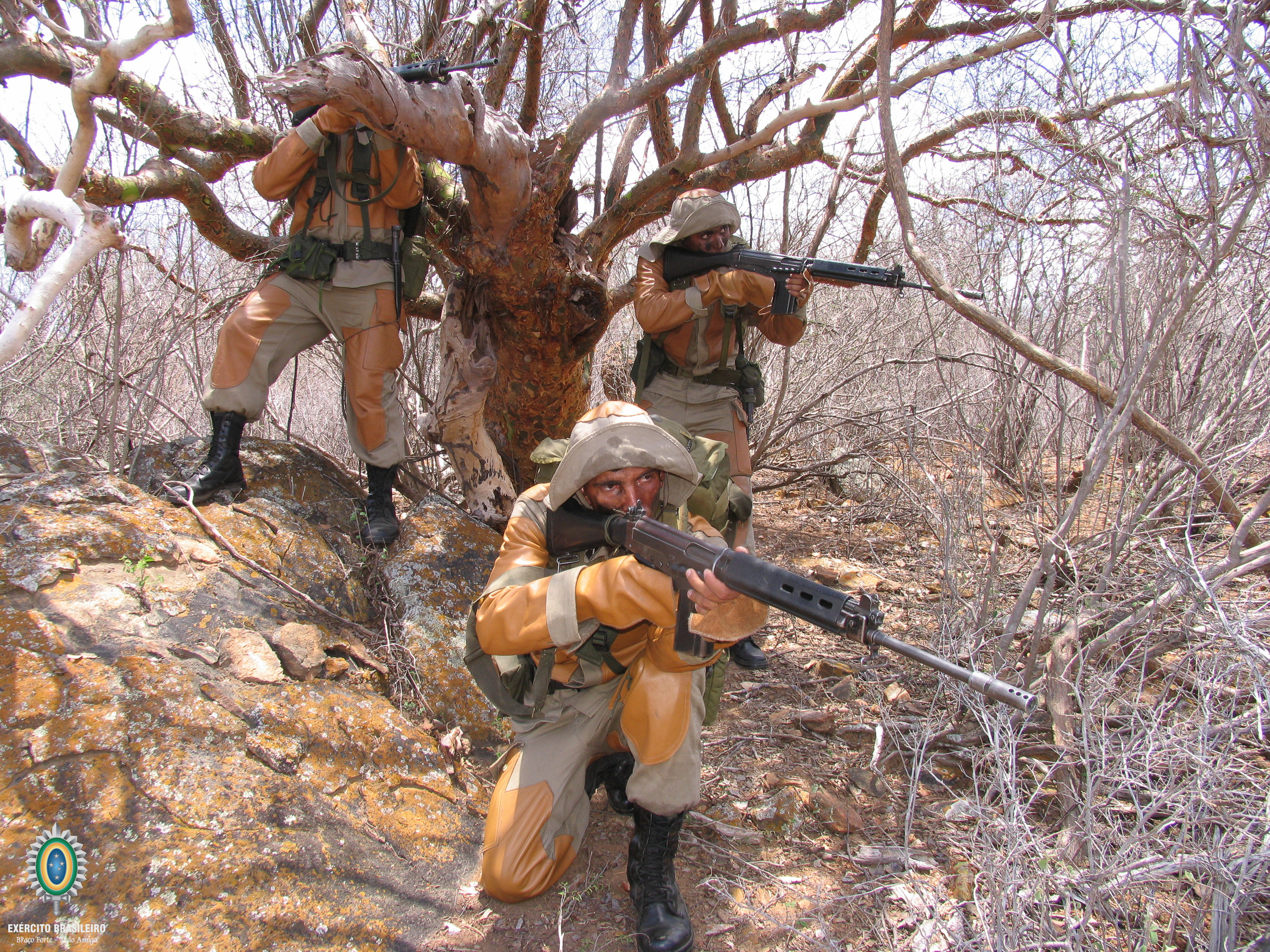
Combatants in the Caatinga

Center for Instruction and Operations in the Caatinga (Portuguese: Centro de Instrução e Operações na Caatinga - CIOpC) is an establishment dedicated to the formation of the Caatinga Combatant of the Brazilian Army.

== Training provision ==
Military combat in the Caatinga encompasses the set of techniques for survival and warfare in the semi-arid biome of the Caatinga, which is uniquely Brazilian. The caatinga is an inhospitable environment, found mainly in the Northeast region of Brazil. Military training to operate in the semi-arid operational environment means that Brazil has the capacity to send troops to any region with a similar climate.

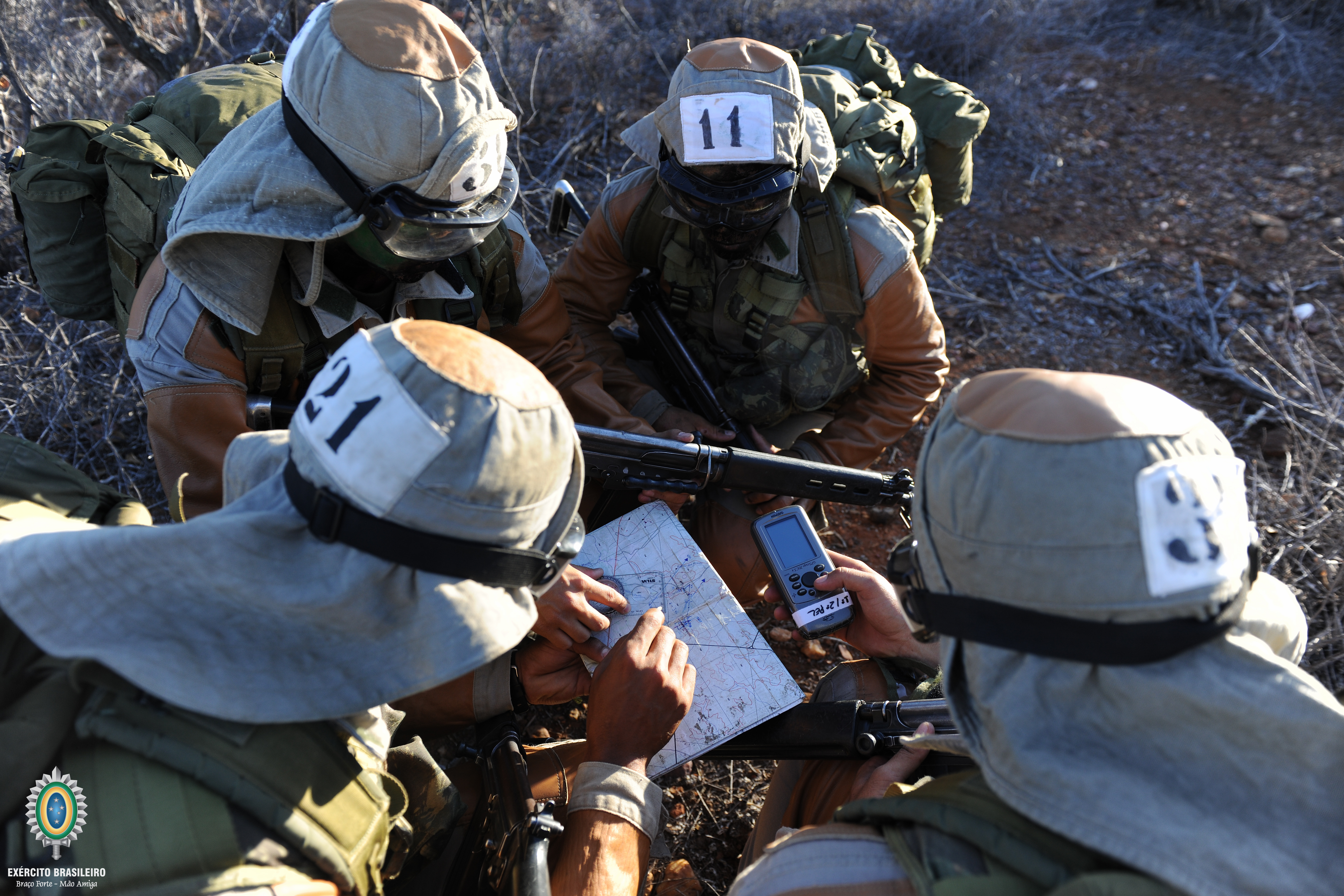
Brazilian Army soldiers in guidance instruction.

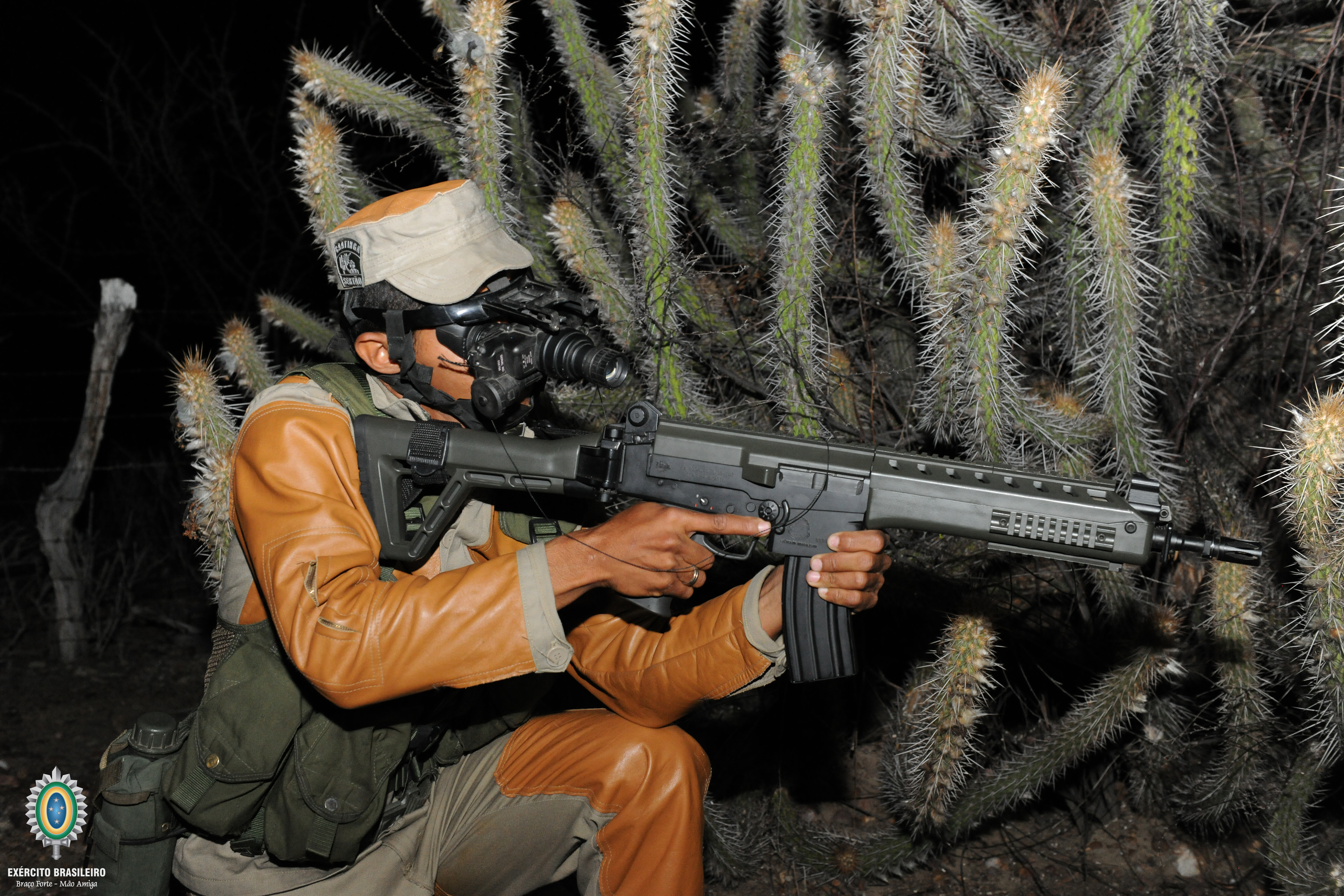
Brazilian soldier during night operation.

Several units of the Brazilian Army are instructed for caatinga operations. The Operations Training Center in the Caatinga (CIOpC), located in the 72nd Motorized Infantry Battalion in Petrolina (PE), is responsible for providing courses to army military and Military Fire Brigade. The courses offered are the Basic Caatinga Combatant Training Course, lasting one week, the Advanced Stage of Caatinga Combatant and the Caatinga Hunter Stage, both lasting for two weeks.

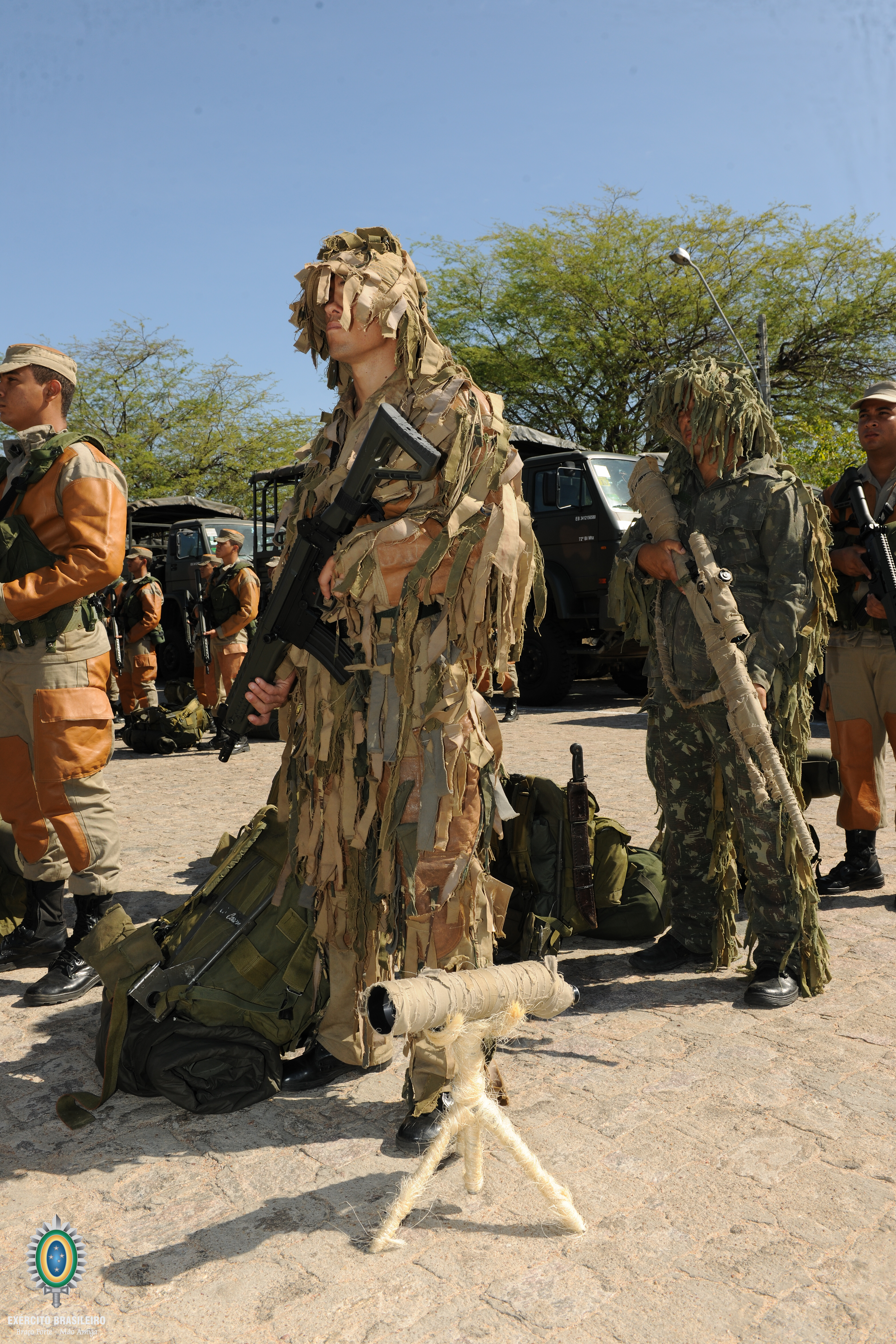
Caatinga snipers

The studies related to military operations in the Caatinga are expanding, with the mission of studying, planning and developing a specific operational doctrine for this environment.

The caatinga bioma requires a uniform that allows a more efficient action than those normally used by the Brazilian Army, made of more resistant material to allow the movement inside the caatinga without compromising the physical integrity of the troop, besides providing some camouflage. Army fighters wear a khaki-colored denim with leather reinforcement on their arms, legs and chest, to protect the body of the military from contact with thorns, dry branches and stones. In opposition to the kevlar helmet, which concentrates great amounts of heat, causes noise in contact with the shrubs and reflects the light, a hat similar to that adopted by the regional cowboys is used, with a foldable flap and extension to protect the nape of the neck. The coturno is similar to the traditional one, with leather tube, more resistant with the top of canvas.

There is a need to use protective desert goggles and leather gloves that protect the back and the palm of the hand but allow the free movement of the fingers.

== History ==
From its inception in 1995 until 2016, the 72nd Motorized Infantry Battalion stages have taught 6,742 soldiers to survive in the hostile caatinga environment.

== Gallery ==
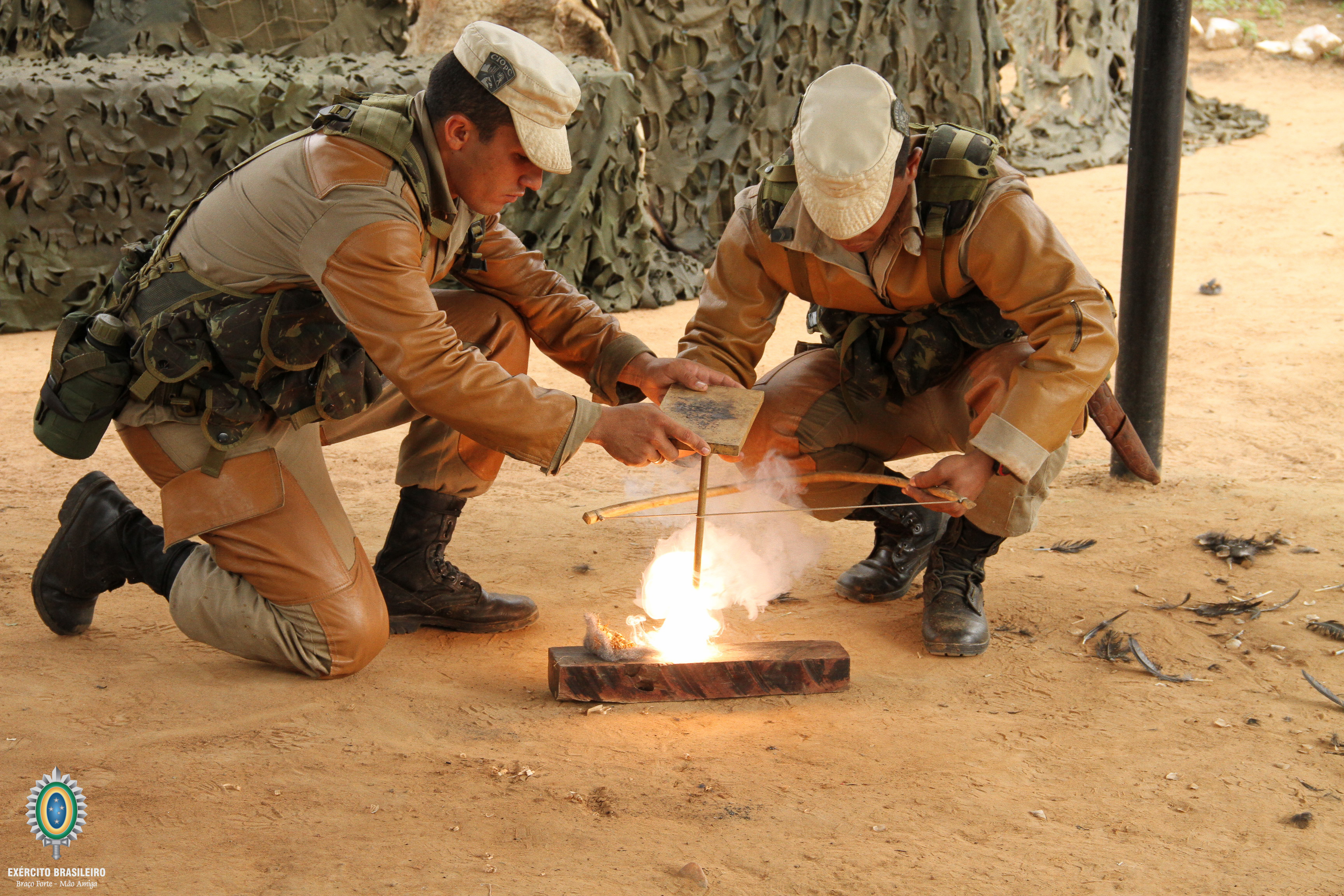

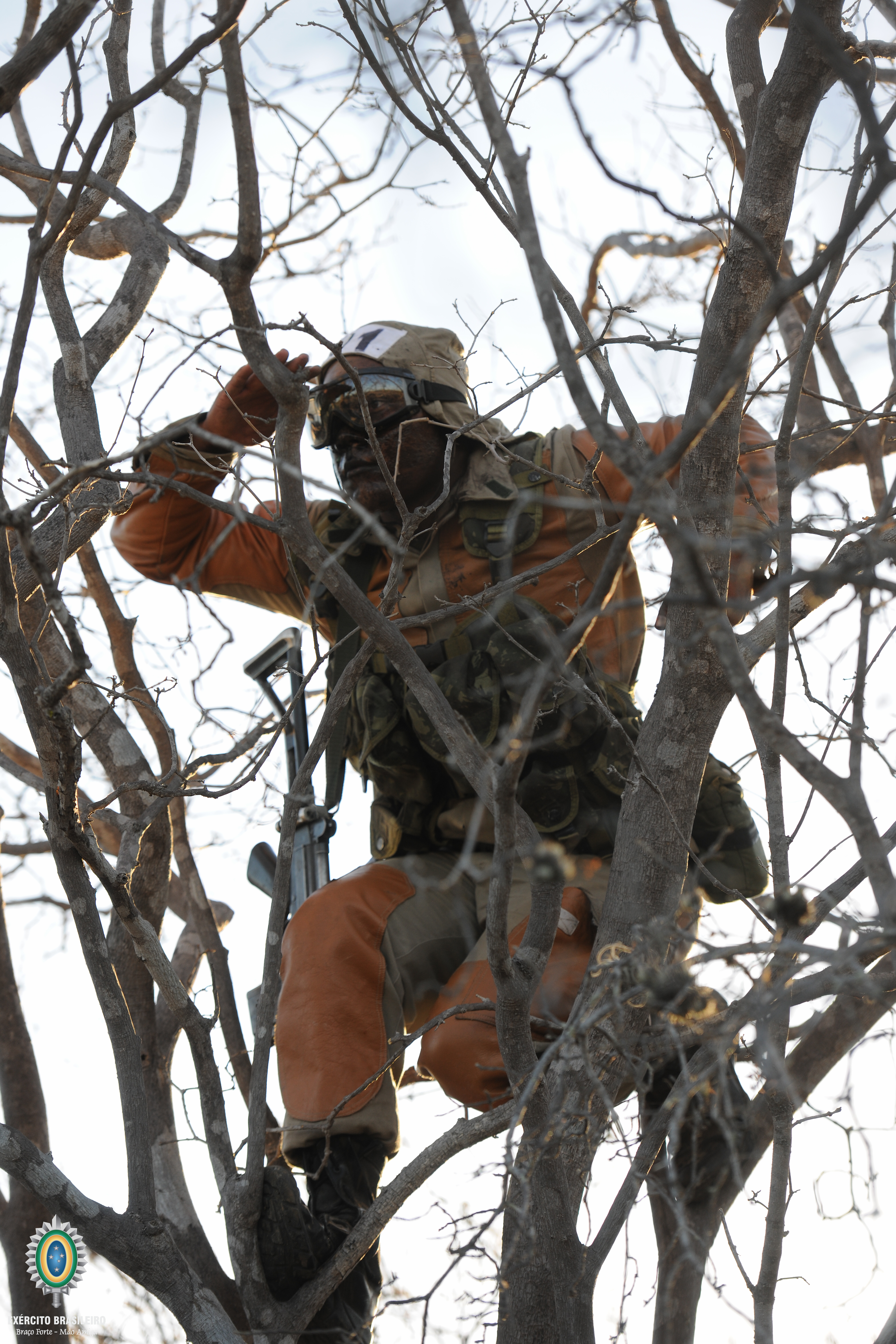

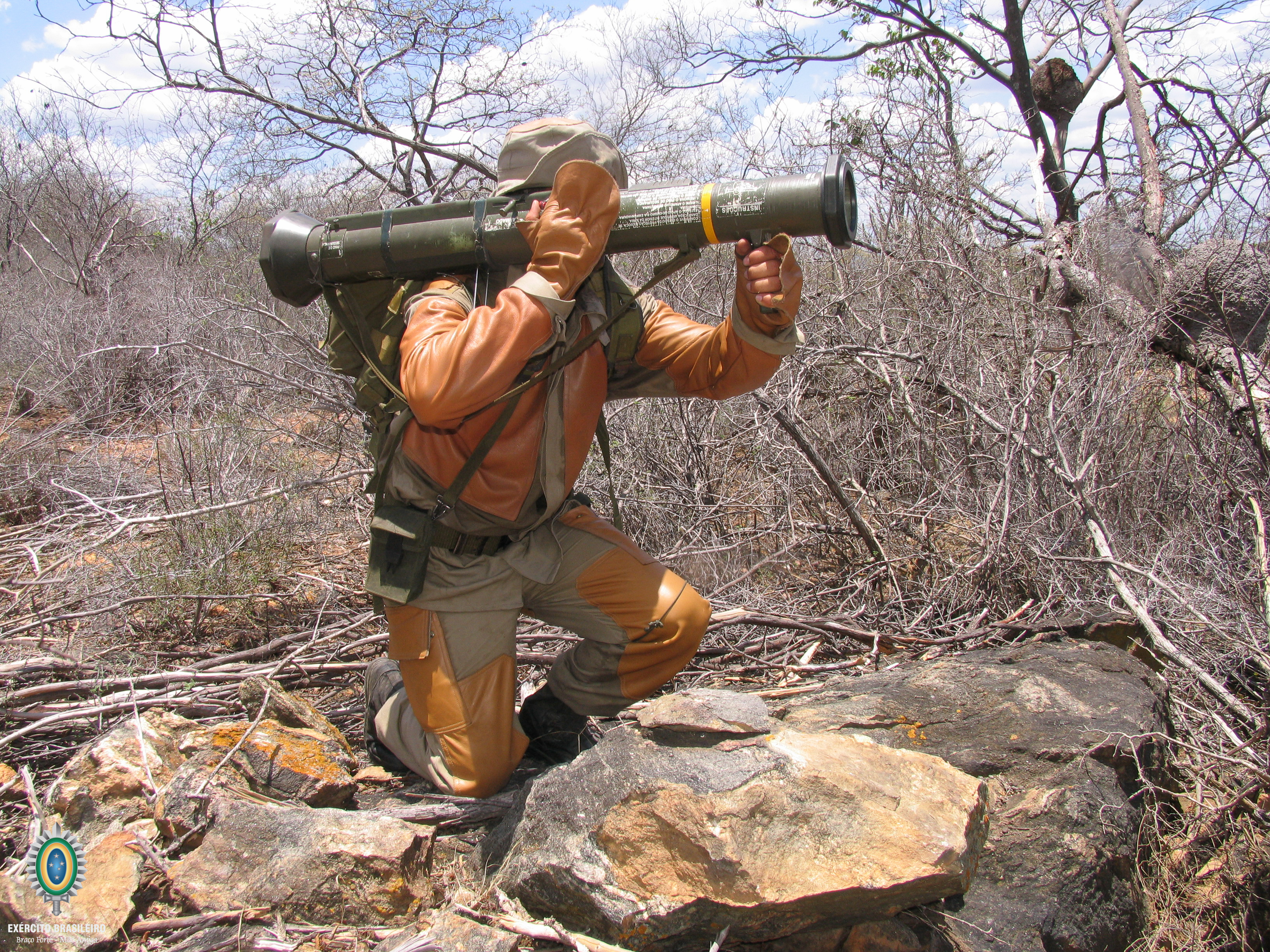

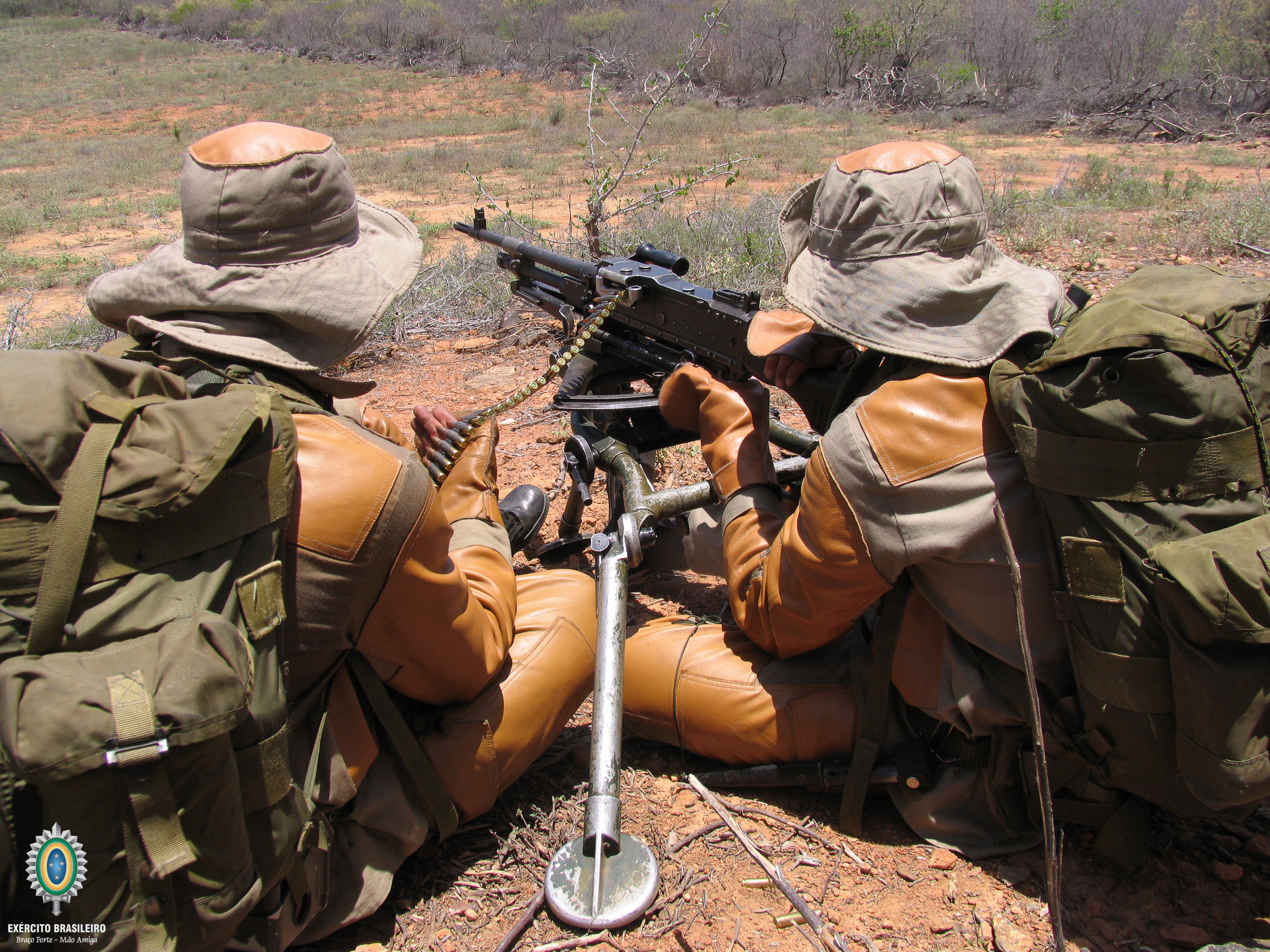

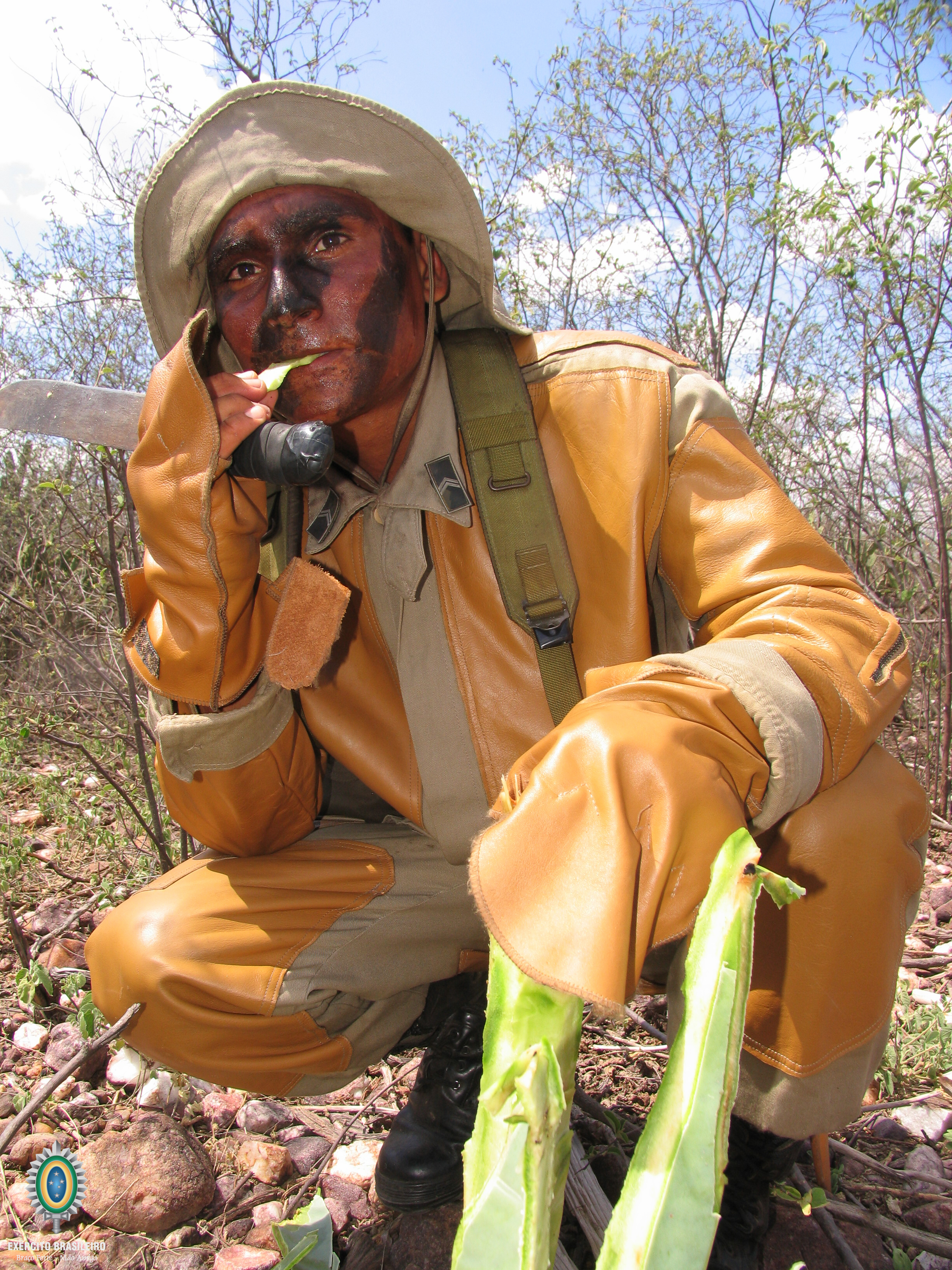

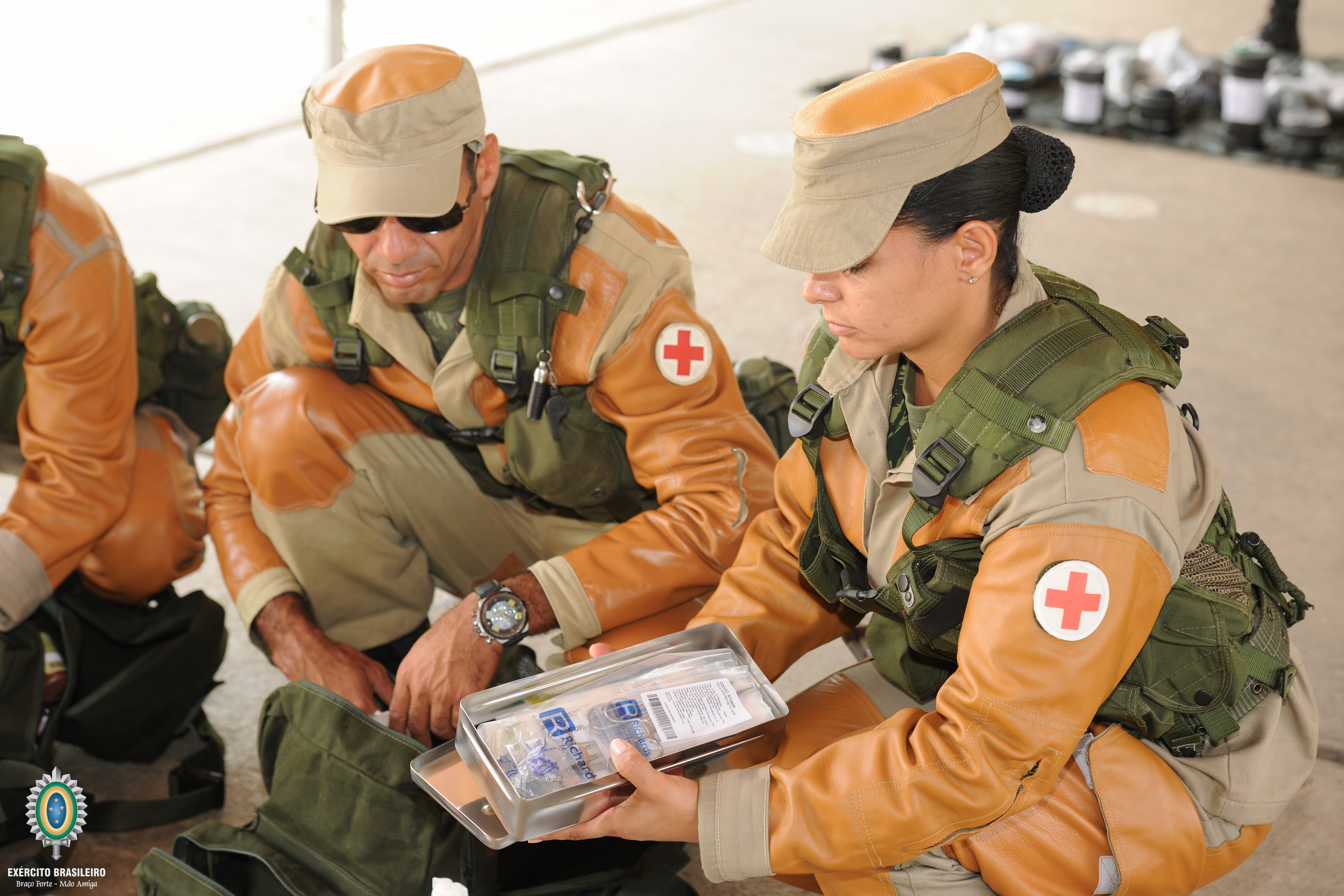

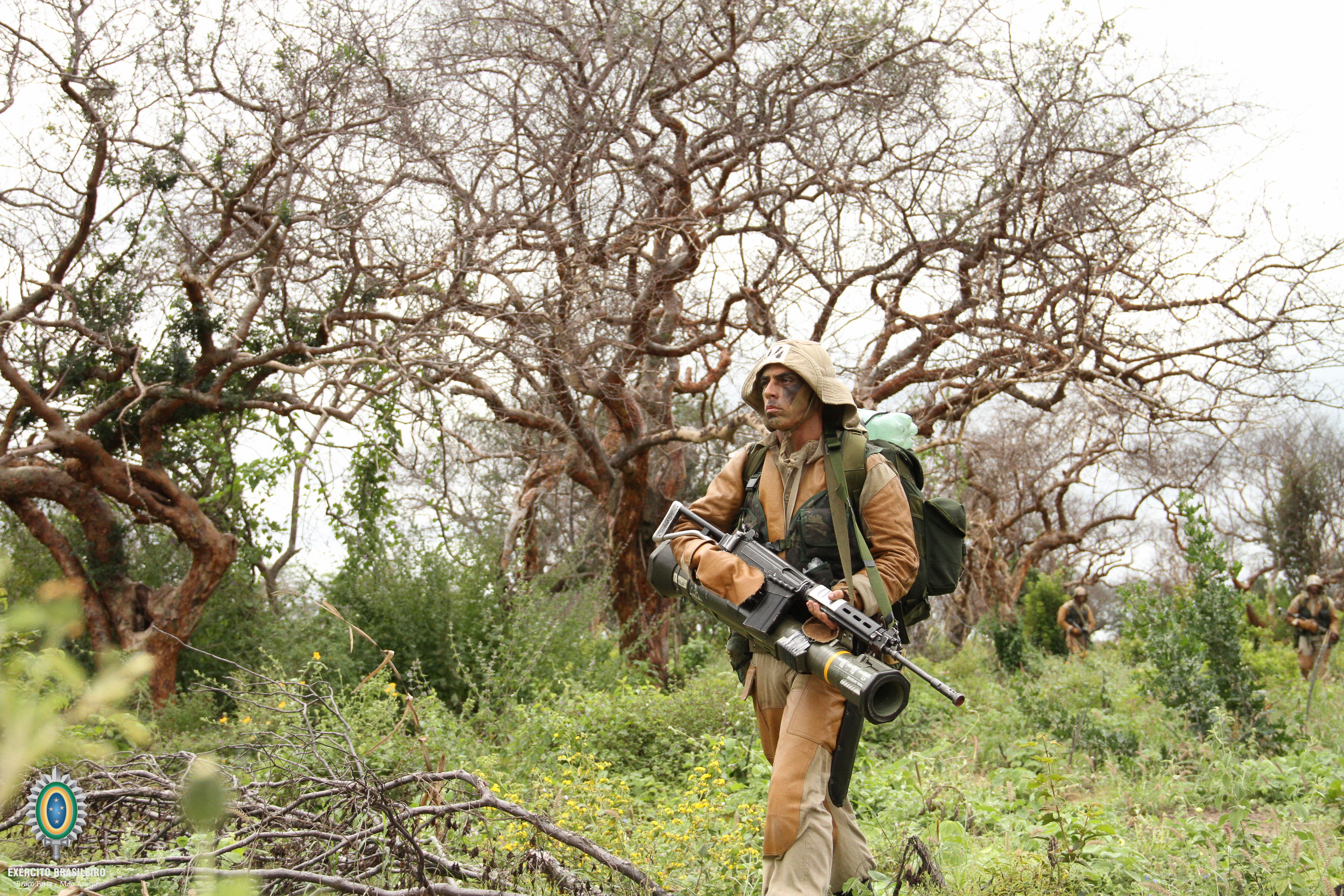

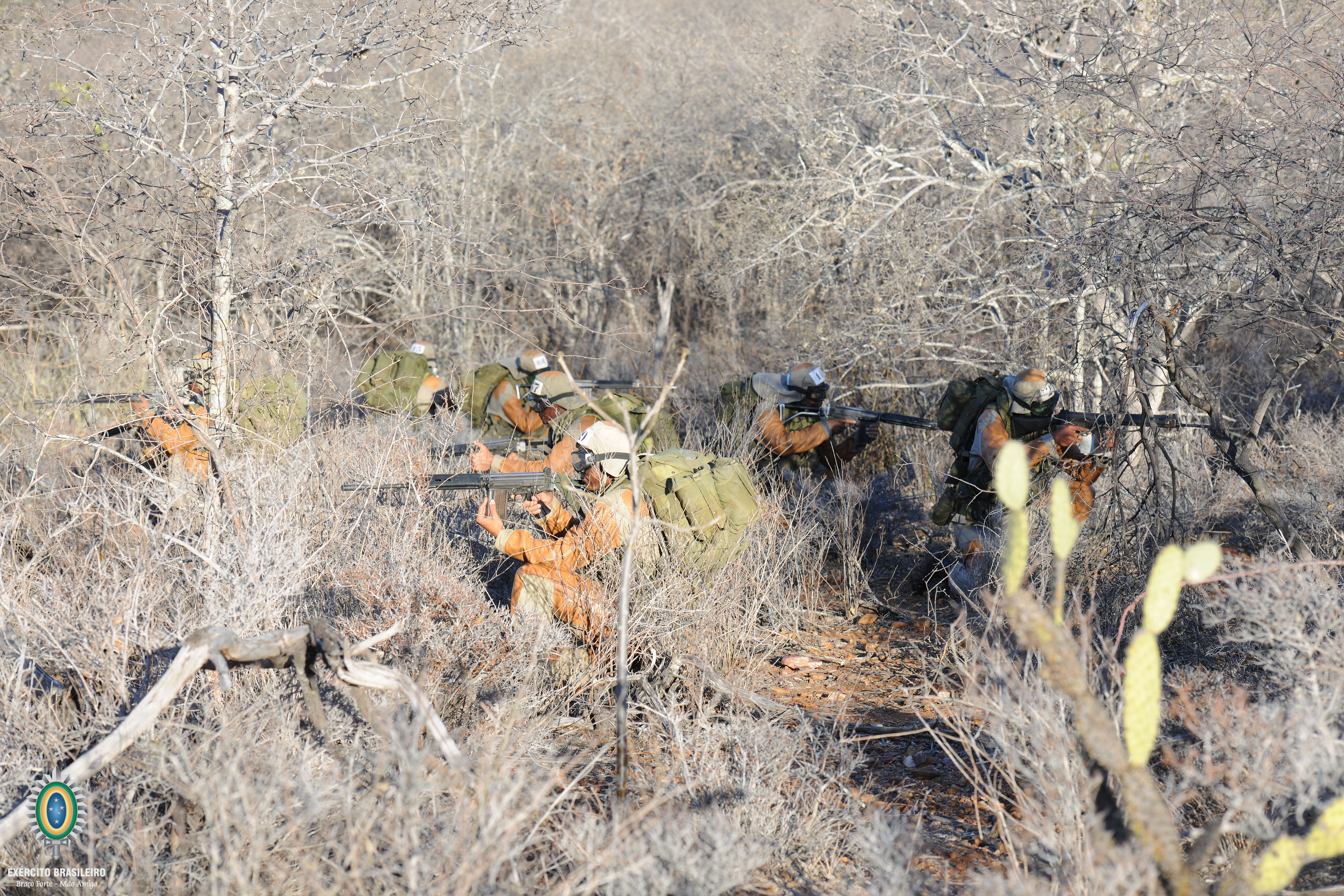

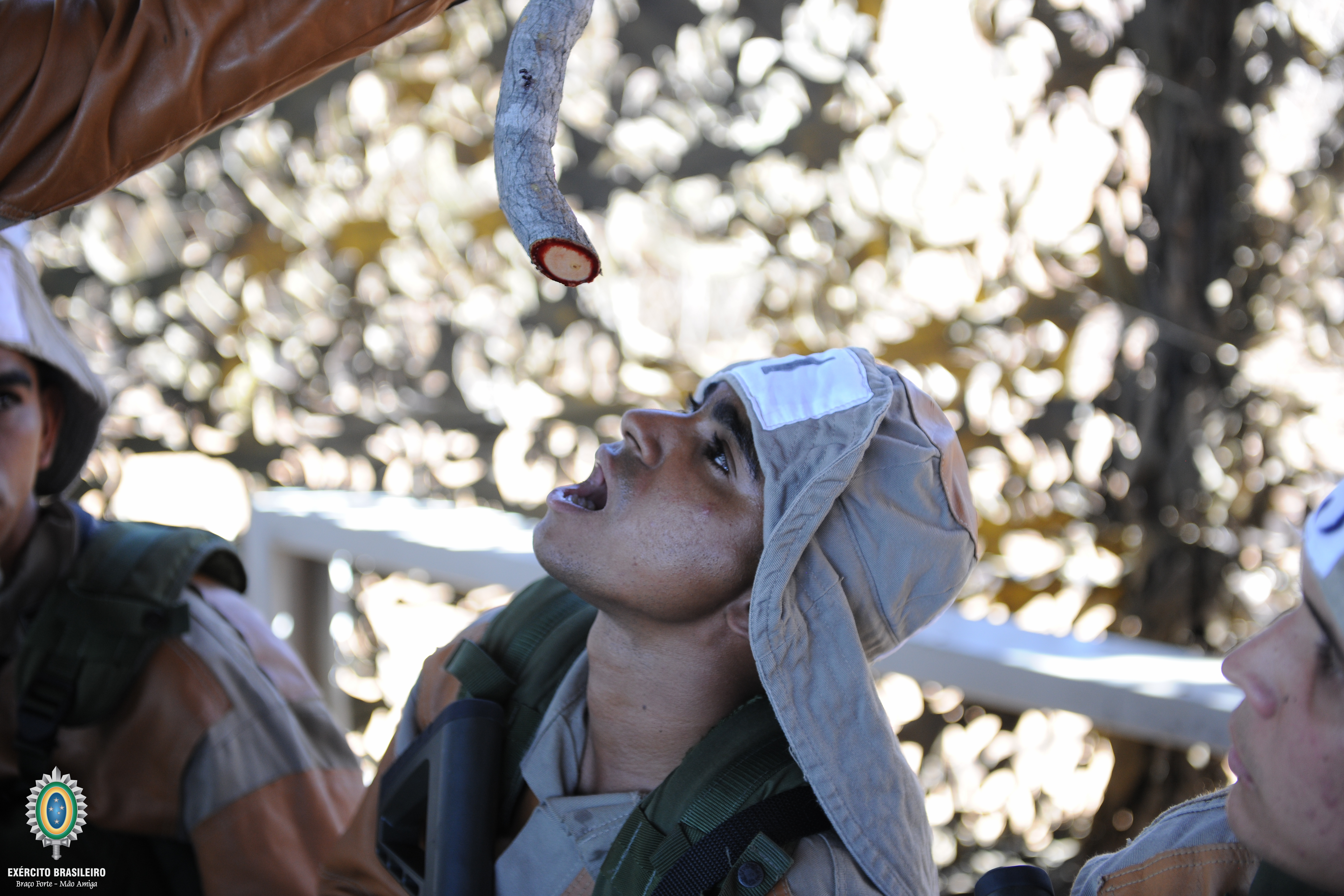

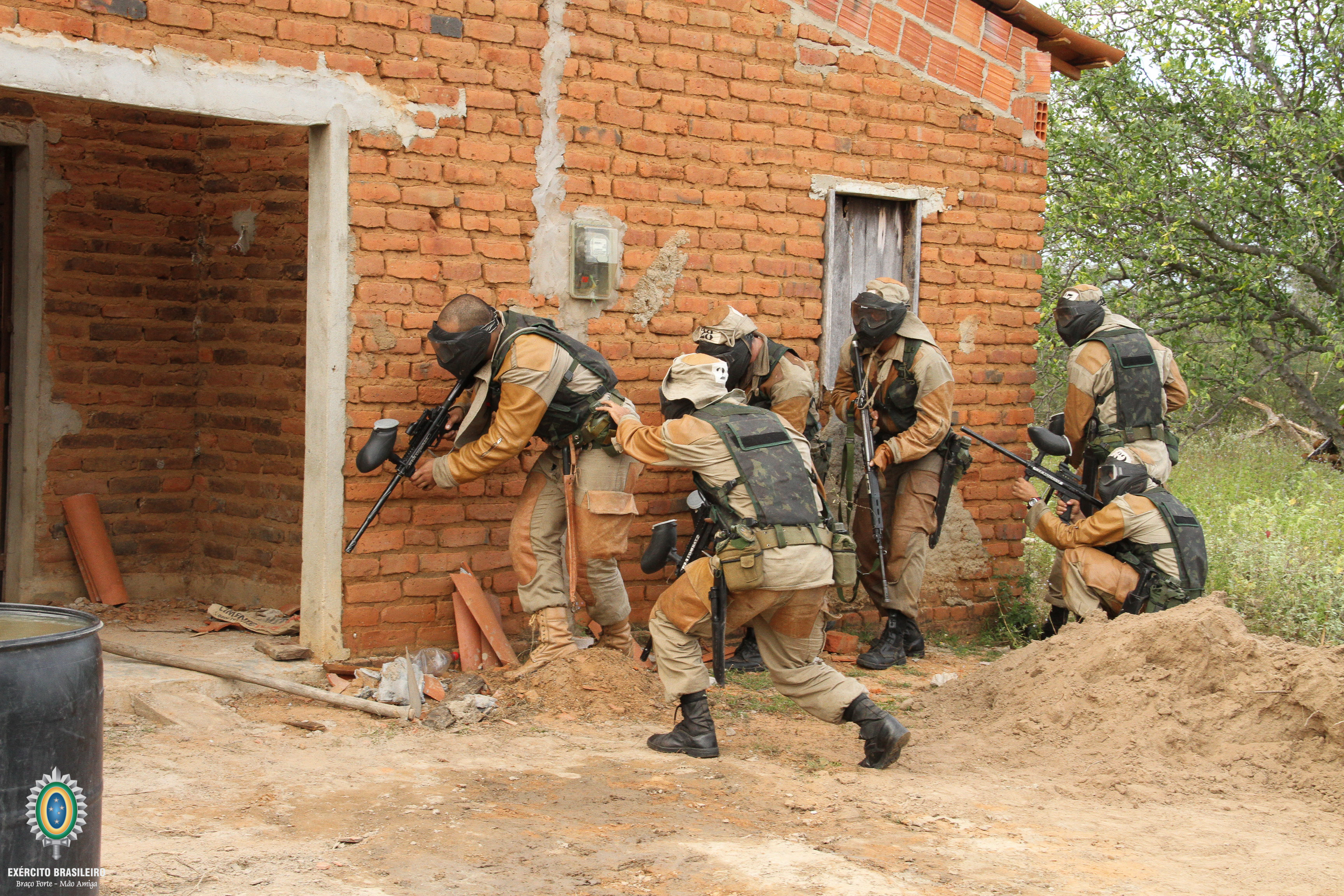

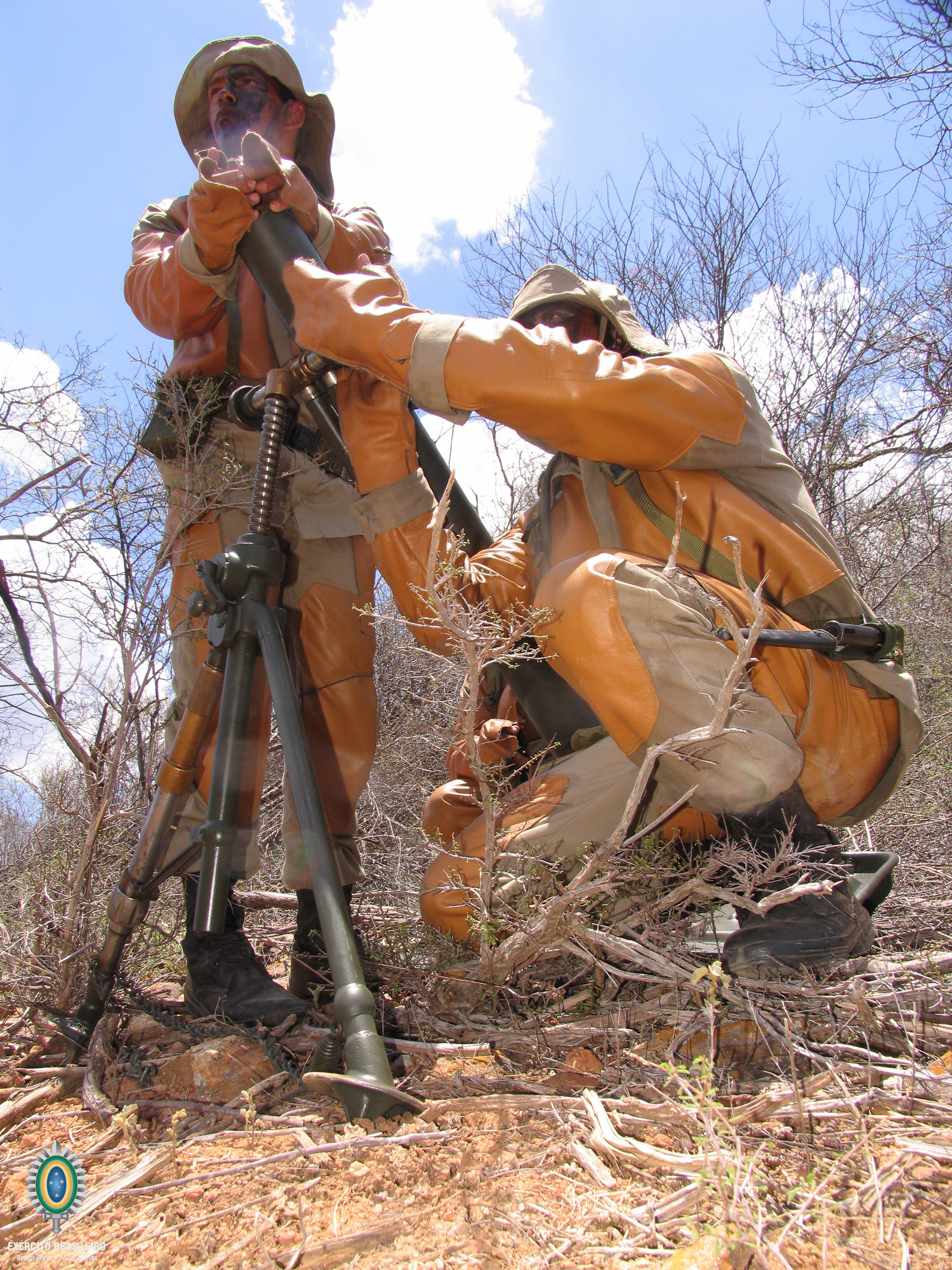

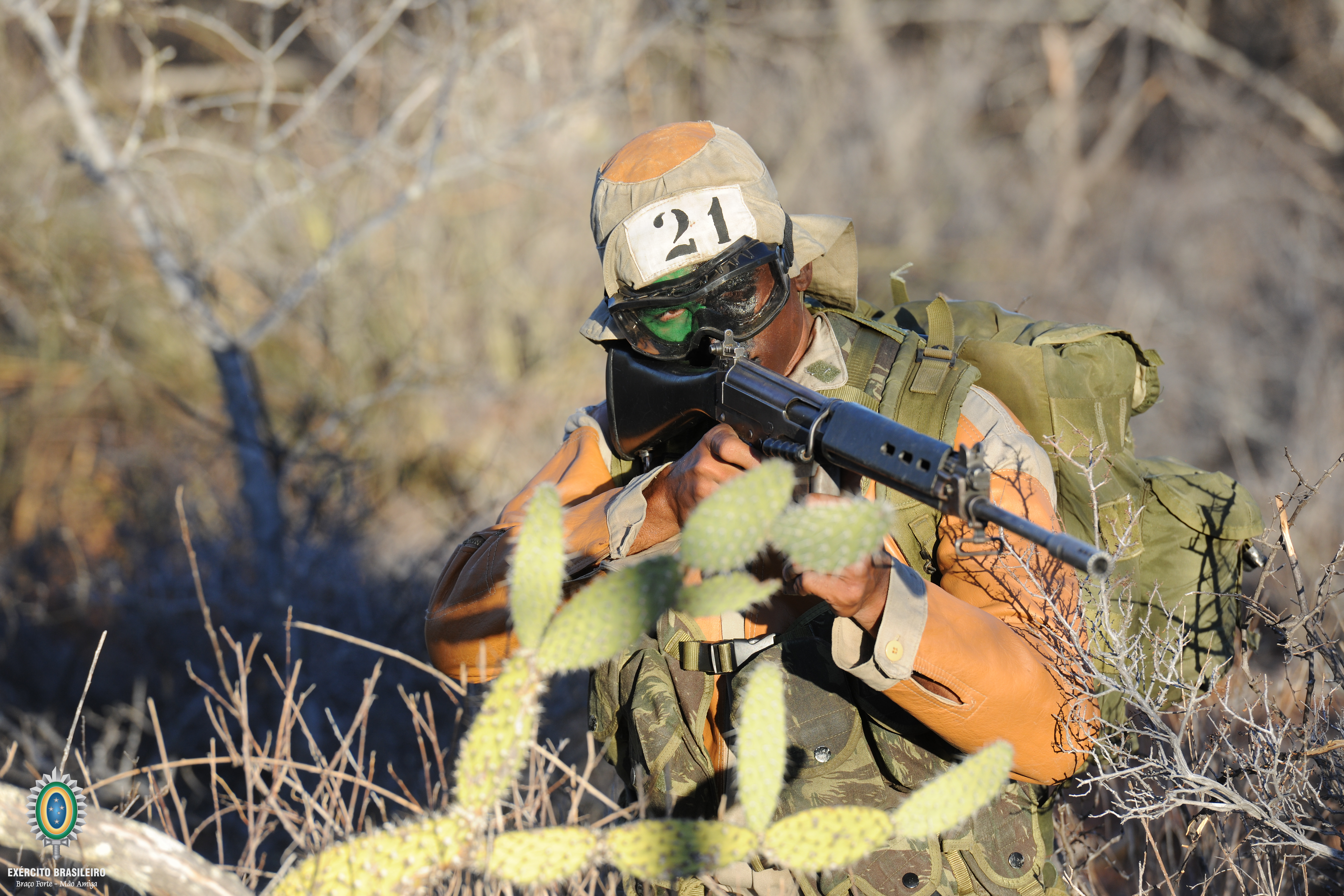

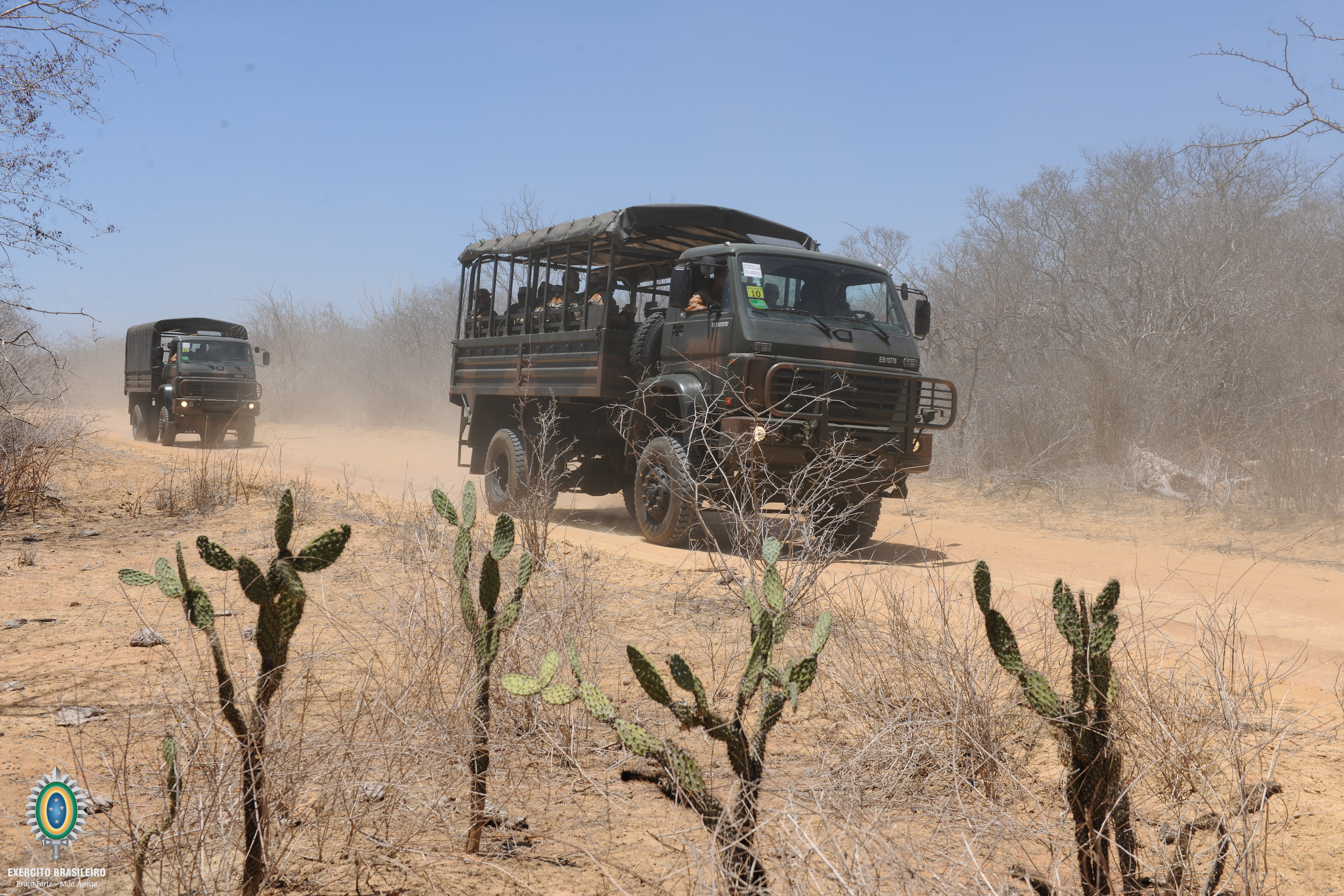

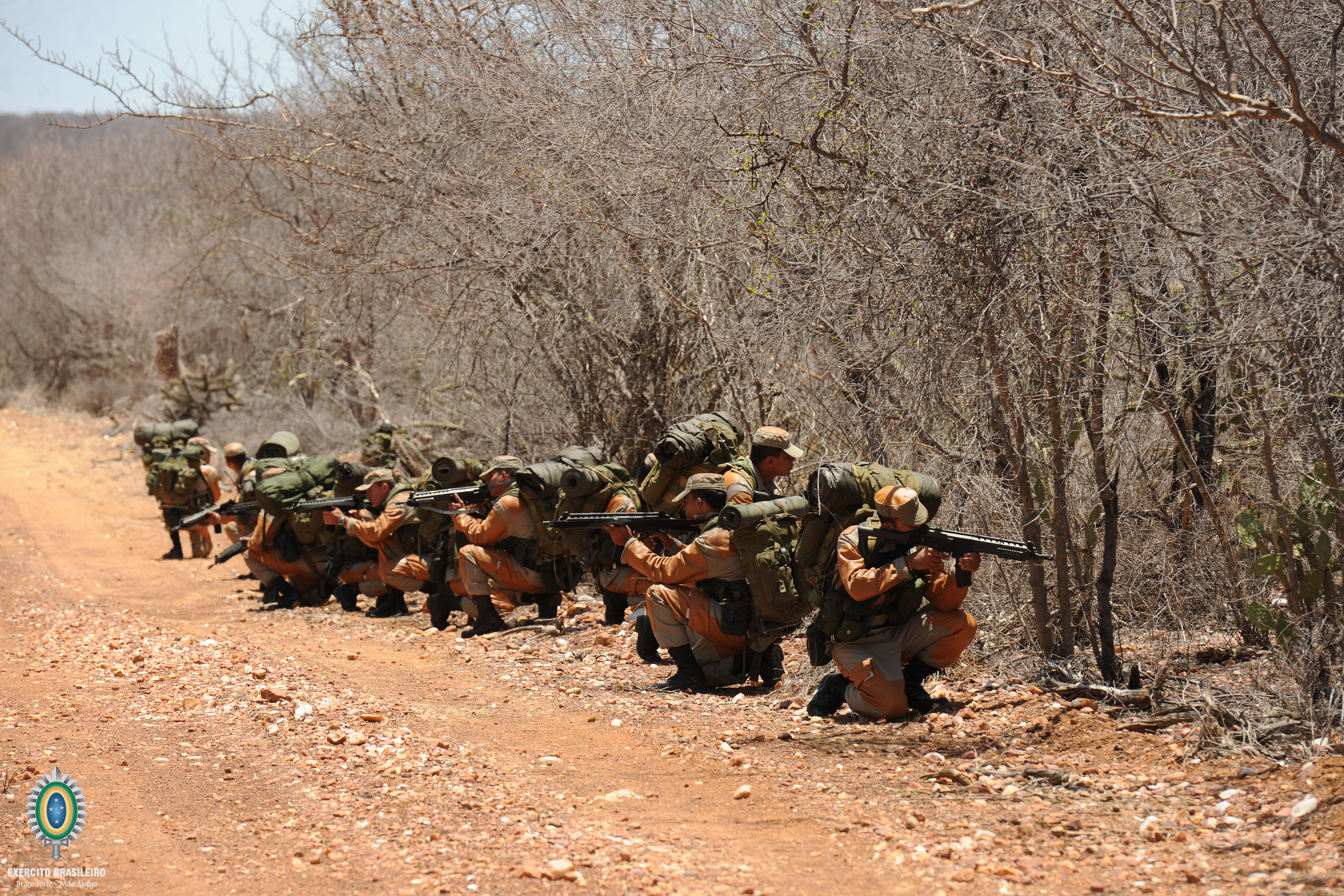

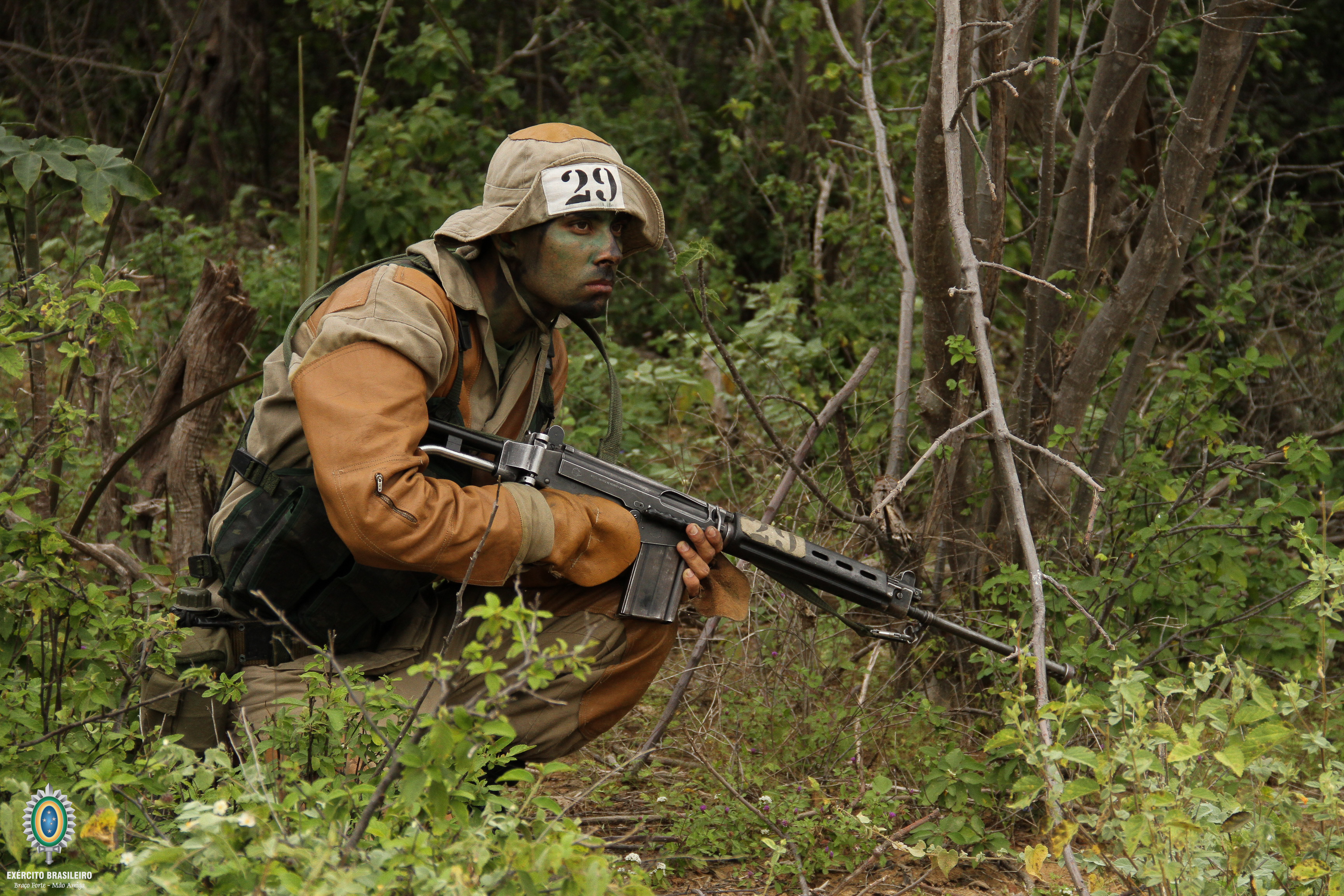

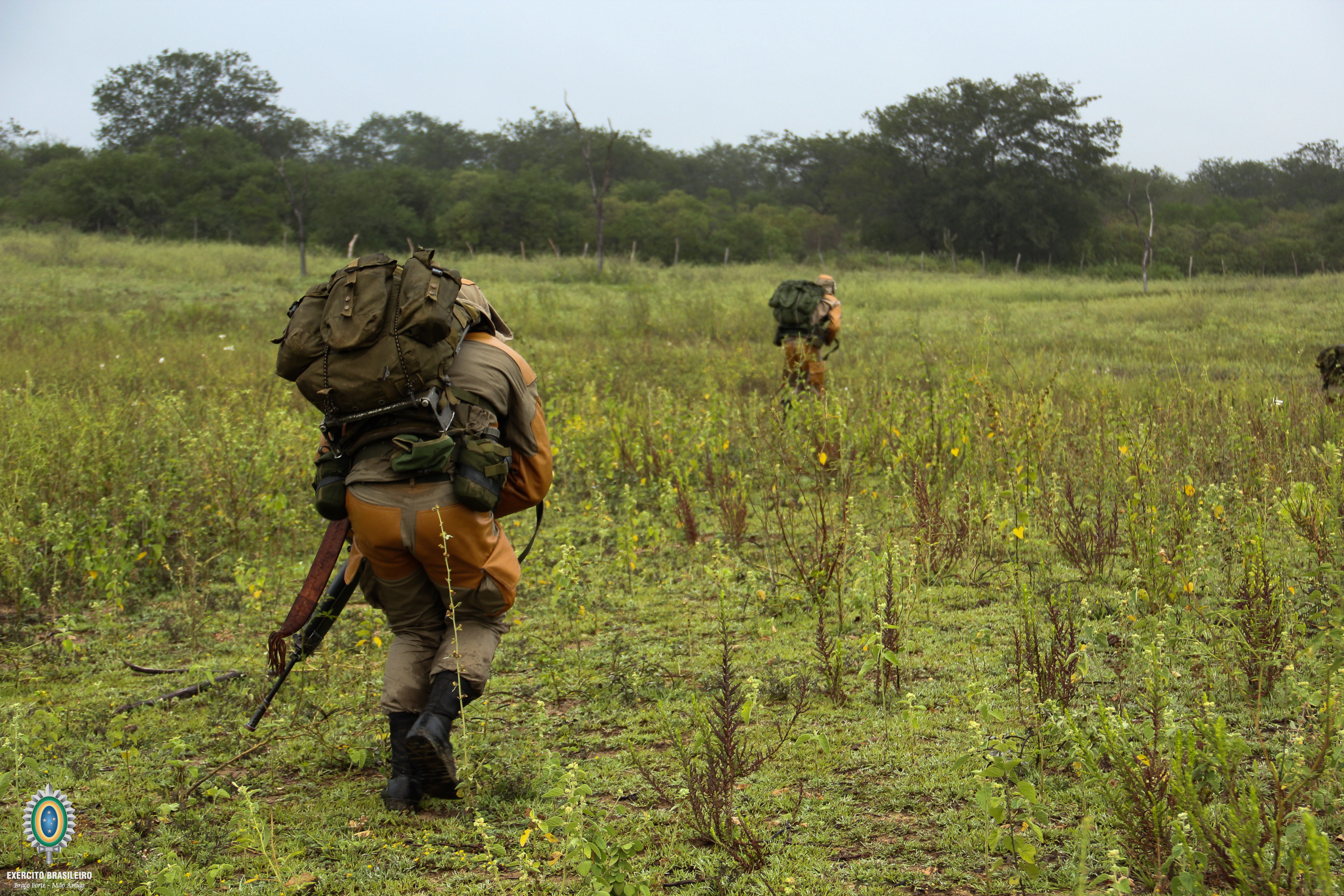

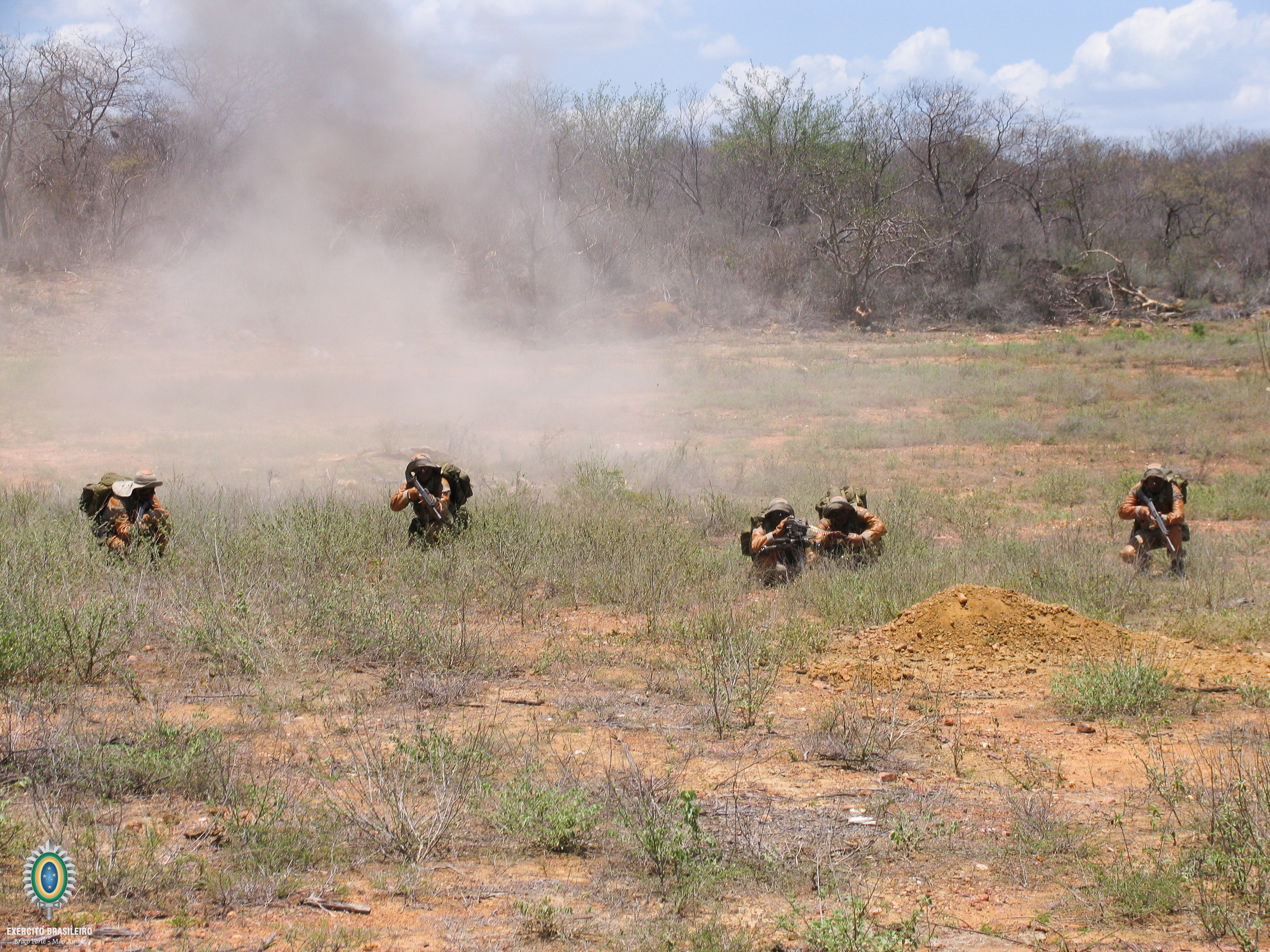
