= Avelar Brandão Vilela =

Brazilian Roman Catholic cardinal

His Eminence Avelar Brandão Vilela
- Archbishop of São Salvador da Bahia
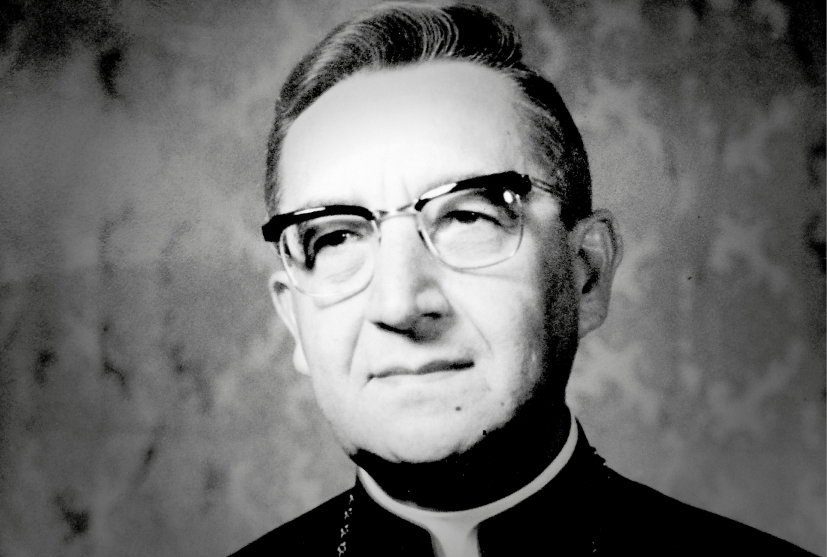
- The then-archbishop pictured in 1968.
- Church: Roman Catholic Church
- Archdiocese: São Salvador da Bahia
- See: São Salvador da Bahia
- Appointed: 25 March 1971
- Term ended: 19 December 1986
- Predecessor: Eugênio de Araújo Sales
- Successor: Lucas Moreira Neves
- Other posts: Cardinal-Priest of Santi Bonifacio ed Alessio (1973-86); Primate of Brazil (1980-86)
- Previous posts: Bishop of Petrolina (1946-55); Archbishop of Teresina (1955-71); Vice-President of the Brazilian Episcopal Conference (1964-68; 1971-74); Second Vice-President of the Latin American Episcopal Council (1965-66); President of the Latin American Episcopal Council (1966-72)

Orders
- Ordination: 27 October 1935 by Antônio Maria Alves de Siqueira
- Consecration: 27 October 1946 by José Tomas Gomes da Silva
- Created cardinal: 5 March 1973 by Pope Paul VI
- Rank: Cardinal-Priest

Personal details
- Born: Avelar Brandão Vilela; 13 June 1912 Viçosa, Alagoas, Brazil
- Baptised: 13 June 1912
- Died: 19 December 1986 (aged 74) São Salvador da Bahia, Brazil
- Buried: São Salvador da Bahia Cathedral
- Motto: De plentitudine Christi
- Coat of arms

Styles of Avelar Brandão Vilela
- Reference style: His Eminence
- Spoken style: Your Eminence
- Informal style: Cardinal
- See: São Salvador da Bahia

Avelar Brandão Vilela (June 13, 1912 – December 19, 1986) was a Brazilian Cardinal of the Roman Catholic Church. He served as Archbishop of São Salvador da Bahia from 1971 until his death, and was elevated to the cardinalate in 1973.

== Biography ==
Avelar Brandão Vilela was born in Viçosa, and studied at the seminaries in Maceió and in Olinda. He was ordained to the priesthood on October 27, 1935. He then served as a professor and spiritual advisor of the seminary of Aracajú, secretary of the Diocese of Aracajú, and diocesan chaplain of the Catholic Action.

On June 13, 1946, his thirty-fourth birthday, Vilela was appointed Bishop of Petrolina by Pope Pius XII. He received his episcopal consecration on the following October 27 from Bishop José Gomes da Silva, with Bishop Adalberto Accioli Sobral and Archbishop Mário de Miranda Villas-Boas serving as co-consecrators. Vilela was later promoted to Archbishop of Teresina on November 5, 1955, and attended the Second Vatican Council from 1962 to 1965. Serving as President of the Latin American Episcopal Conference from 1966 to 1972, he was named Archbishop of São Salvador da Bahia on March 25, 1971.

Pope Paul VI created him Cardinal Priest of Santi Bonifacio e Alessio in the consistory of March 5, 1973. Vilela was one of the cardinal electors who participated in the conclaves of August and October 1978, which selected Popes John Paul I and John Paul II respectively. He earned the nickname of the "Great Conciliator" for his ability to reach both progressives and conservatives in the Brazilian Church, and was given the title of Primate of Brazil when his archdiocese was raised to that rank on October 25, 1980.

The Cardinal died from stomach cancer in São Salvador, at age 74. He is buried at the metropolitan cathedral of São Salvador da Bahia.

== Trivia ==
- The Cardinal was the brother of Senator Teotonio Vilela (d. 1983)

Catholic Church titles
Preceded by Idílio Soares	Bishop of Petrolina; 1946–1955	Succeeded by Antônio Campelo de Aragão, SDB
Preceded by Severino Vieira de Melo	Archbishop of Teresina; 1955–1971	Succeeded by José Freire Falcão
Preceded by Eugênio de Araújo Sales	Archbishop of São Salvador da Bahia; 1971–1986	Succeeded by Lucas Moreira Neves, OP
