= Diocese of Petrolina =

Catholic ecclesiastical territory

Diocese of Petrolina Dioecesis Petrolinensis

Catholic
- Cathedral of the Sacred Heart of Jesus Christ the King

Location
- Country: Brazil
- Ecclesiastical province: Olinda e Recife

Statistics
- Area: 31,065 km^{2} (11,994 sq mi)
- Population: Total; Catholics: (as of 2004); 650,000; 585,000 (90.0%)

Information
- Denomination: Catholic Church
- Sui iuris church: Latin Church
- Rite: Roman Rite
- Established: 30 November 1923 (102 years ago)
- Cathedral: Catedral Sagrado Coração de Jesus e Cristo Rei

Current leadership
- Pope: Leo XIV
- Bishop: Francisco Canindé Palhano
- Metropolitan Archbishop: Fernando Antônio Saburido, O.S.B.
- Bishops emeritus: Paulo Cardoso da Silva, O. Carm. Manoel dos Reis de Farias

Website
- www.diocesedepetrolina.org.br

The Diocese of Petrolina (Latin: Dioecesis Petrolinensis) is a Latin Church ecclesiastical territory or diocese of the Catholic Church in Southern Brazil. It is a suffragan diocese in the ecclesiastical province of the metropolitan Archdiocese of Olinda e Recife.

Its cathedra is in Catedral Sagrado Coração de Jesus e Cristo Rei, dedicated to the Sacred Heart of Christ the King, in the episcopal see of Petrolina in the state of Pernambuco.

== History ==
- Established on 30 November 1923 as Diocese of Petrolina, on territory split off from the Diocese of Pesqueira (now in the same province)
- Lost territories on 1964.02.15, to establish the Diocese of Floresta, and on 2010.06.16 to establish the Diocese of Salgueiro (both in the same province).

== Statistics ==
As of 2015, it pastorally served 350,500 Catholics (83.0% of 422,100 total population) on 16,260 km^{2} in 23 parishes and 2 missions with 25 priests (22 diocesan, 3 religious), 28 lay religious (3 brothers, 25 sisters) and 18 seminarians.

== Episcopal Ordinaries ==
Bishops of Petrolina

- Antônio Malan, Salesians (S.D.B.) (born Italy, the only foreign incumbent) (1924.01.03 – death 1931.10.28); previously Titular Bishop of Amisus (1914.05.25 – 1924.01.03) as Bishop-Prelate of Territorial Prelature of Registro do Araguaia (Brazil) (1914.05.25 – 1924.01.03)
- Idílio José Soares (1932.09.16 – 1943.06.12): next Bishop of Santos (Brazil) (1943.06.12 – 1966.11.21), retired as Titular Bishop of Vegesela in Numidia (1966.11.21 – death 1969.12.10)
- Avelar Brandão Vilela (1946.06.13 – 1955.11.05); later Metropolitan Archbishop of Teresina (Brazil) (1955.11.05 – 1971.03.25), Vice-President of National Conference of Bishops of Brazil (1964 – 1968), Second Vice-President of Latin American Episcopal Council (1965 – 1966), President of Latin American Episcopal Council (1966 – 1972), Vice-President of National Conference of Bishops of Brazil (1971 – 1974), Metropolitan Archbishop of São Salvador da Bahia (Brazil) (1971.03.25 – death 1986.12.19), Cardinal-Priest of Ss. Bonifacio ed Alessio (1973.03.05 – 1986.12.19)
- Antônio Campelo de Aragão, S.D.B. (1956.12.18 – retired 1975.02.06), died 1988; previously Titular Bishop of Sesta (1950.06.15 – 1956.12.18) as Auxiliary Bishop of Archdiocese of Cuiaba (Brazil) (1950.06.15 – 1956.12.18)
- Gerardo de Andrade Ponte (1975.02.06 – 1983.12.05): next Bishop of Patos (Brazil) (1983.12.05 – retired 2001.08.08), died 2006
- Paulo Cardoso da Silva, O. Carm. (1984.11.30 – retired 2011.07.27)
- Manoel dos Reis de Farias (2011.07.27 - retired 2017.07.12), previously Bishop of Patos (2001.08.08 – 2011.07.27)
- Francisco Canindé Palhano (2018.01.03 – ...), previously Bishop of Bonfim (Brazil) (2006.07.26 – 2018.01.03).

== See also ==
- List of Catholic dioceses in Brazil
- Sacred Heart Cathedral, Petrolina

== Sources and references ==
- GCatholic.org, with Google map; data for all sections
- Catholic Hierarchy
