= Diocese of Salgueiro =

Catholic ecclesiastical territory

Diocese of Salgueiro Dioecesis Salicensis
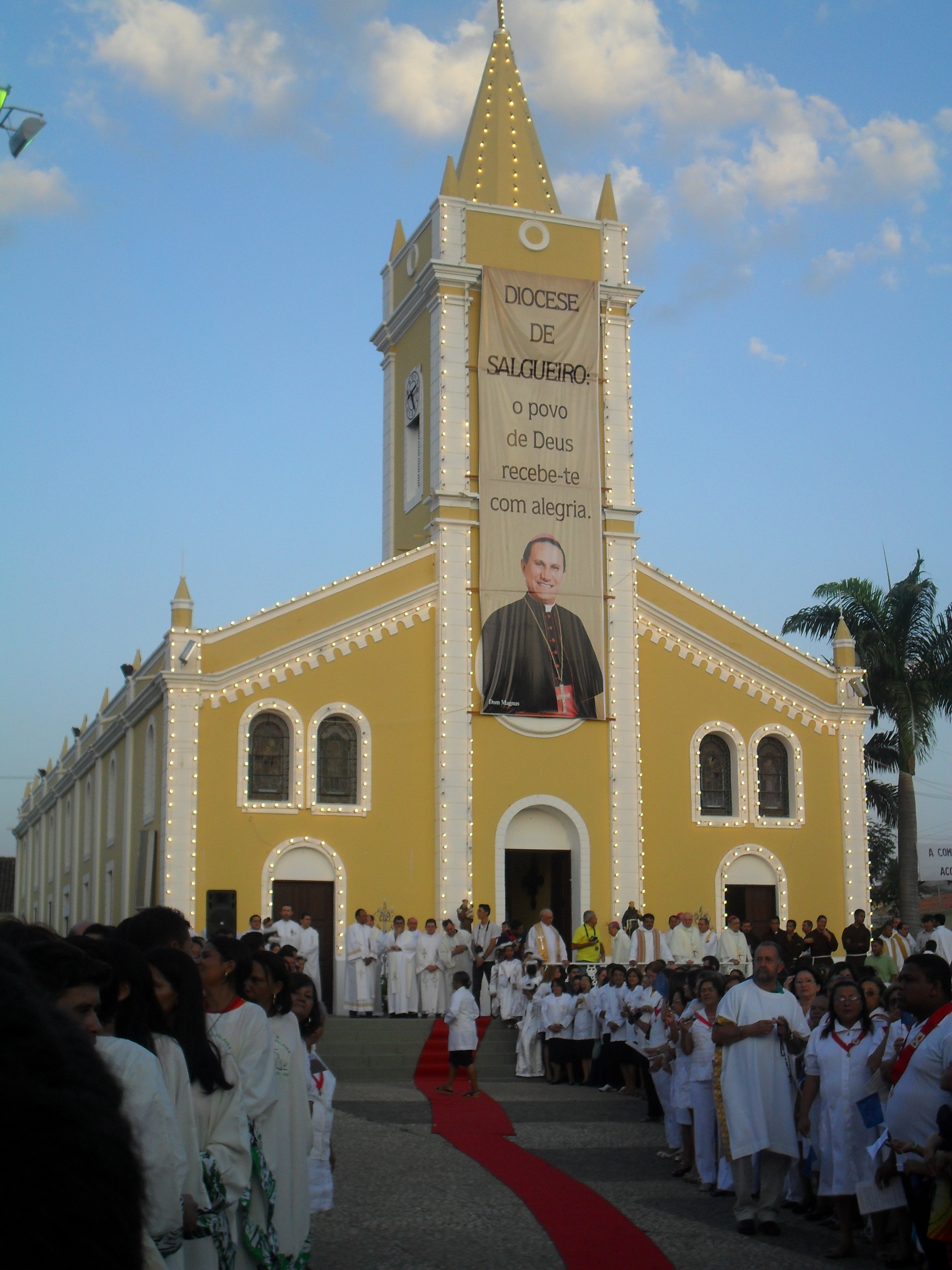
- Cathedral of St. Anthony

Location
- Country: Brazil
- Ecclesiastical province: Olinda e Recife

Statistics
- Area: 17,931 km^{2} (6,923 sq mi)
- Population: Total; Catholics: (as of 2010); 439,418; 351,534 (80.0%)

Information
- Denomination: Catholic Church
- Rite: Latin Rite
- Established: 16 June 2010 (15 years ago)
- Cathedral: Catedral de Santo Antônio

Current leadership
- Pope: Leo XIV
- Bishop: José Vicente Pinto de Alencar da Silva
- Metropolitan Archbishop: Fernando Antônio Saburido, OSB

Website
- www.diocesedesalgueiro.org.br

The Roman Catholic Diocese of Salgueiro is a diocese located in the city of Salgueiro in the ecclesiastical province of Olinda e Recife in Brazil.

== History ==
- 16 June 2010: Established as Diocese of Salgueiro from the Diocese of Floresta and Diocese of Petrolina

== Leadership ==
- Bishops of Salgueiro (Roman rite)
  - Bishop Magnus Henrique Lopes, OFMCap (16 June 2010 – 12 January 2022), appointed, Bishop of Crato
  - Bishop José Vicente Pinto de Alencar da Silva (29 March 2023 – Present)
