= Federal University of the São Francisco Valley =

Federal Public University headquartered in Petrolina, Pernambuco

- Universidade Federal do Vale do São Francisco
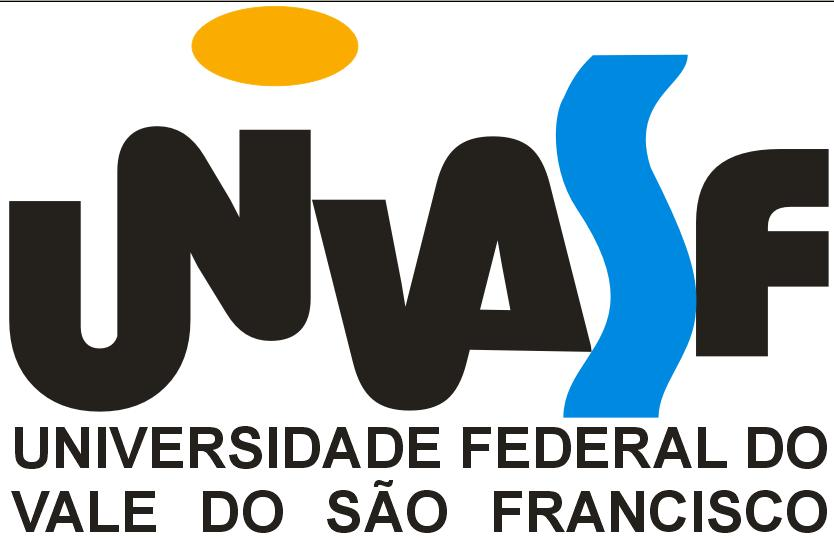
- Other names: UNIVASF
- Type: Public university
- Established: June 27, 2002
- Rector: Paulo César Fagundes Neves
- Students: 6,211 (2019)
- Location: Petrolina, Pernambuco, Brazil
- Campus: Five campuses across the São Francisco River Valley region in states of Pernambuco, Bahia and Piauí
- Website: www.univasf.edu.br

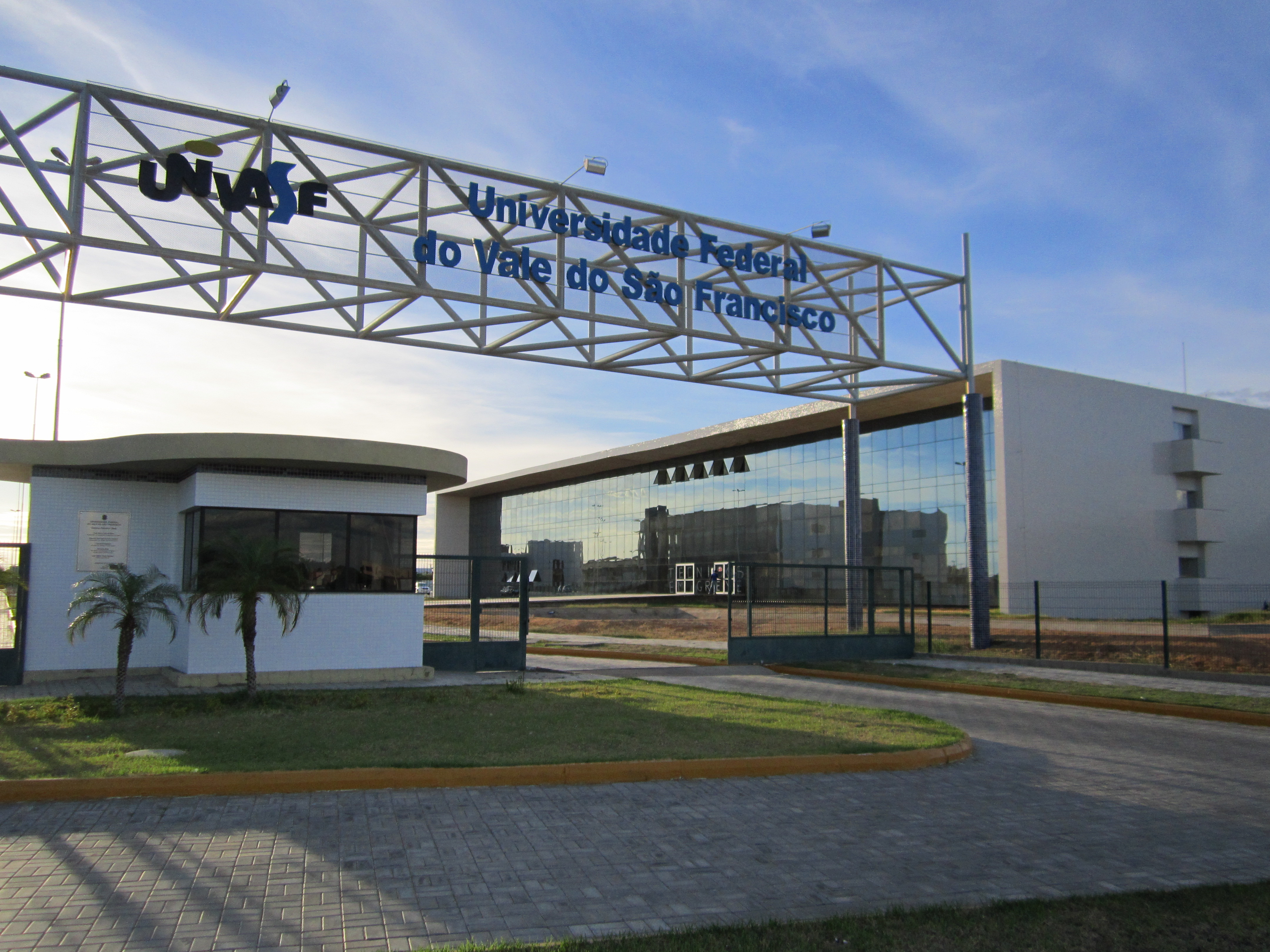
Petrolina campus entrance

The Federal University of the São Francisco Valley (Portuguese: Universidade Federal do Vale do São Francisco, UNIVASF) is a publicly funded university serving the São Francisco Valley in the states of Pernambuco, Bahia and Piauí in Brazil. It is headquartered in Petrolina and has campuses in the municipalities of Juazeiro, Senhor do Bonfim, and Paulo Afonso, Bahia; Petrolina, and Salgueiro Pernambuco; and São Raimundo Nonato, Piauí. In 2019, the university enrolled a total of 6,211 students across all campuses in 31 programs of study.

In 2019, Folha de São Paulo ranked UNIVASF 106th nationally, with its animal science program ranked in the top 25.

== History ==
The university was created with a federal law passed on June 27, 2002, with a mandate to operate across state lines in the historically under-developed semi-arid Sertão of Brazil's northeast. It began operations in 2004. From 2015, its medical school was affiliated with a teaching hospital in Petrolina: the Hospital Universitário da Universidade Federal do Vale do São Francisco.

== See also ==
- List of federal universities of Brazil
