= Sacred Heart Cathedral, Petrolina =

Sacred Heart Cathedral
- Catedral Sagrado Coração de Jesus e Cristo Rei
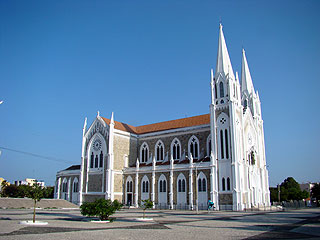
- Sacred Heart Cathedral
- Location: Petrolina
- Country: Brazil
- Denomination: Roman Catholic Church

The Sacred Heart Cathedral (Portuguese: Catedral Sagrado Coração de Jesus e Cristo Rei) or Cathedral of the Sacred Heart of Jesus and Christ the King, also Petrolina Cathedral, is a religious building affiliated with the Catholic Church located in the center of the city of Petrolina, in the state of Pernambuco in the northeastern region of the South American country of Brazil.

== History ==
The cathedral was built in Neo-Gothic style and was inaugurated in 1929, following the Roman or Latin rite and serving as the main church of the Catholic Diocese of Petrolina (Dioecesis Petrolinensis) which was created in 1923 through the bull "Dominicis gregis" of Pope Pius XI.

It is under the pastoral responsibility of Bishop Manoel dos Reis de Farias. From January 2014 the cathedral underwent a process of internal and external renovation with works planned to finish in 2015. Therefore during that period of work the faithful had to carry out their religious activities in the nearby church of Our Lady Queen of the Angels (Nossa Senhora Rainha dos Anjos) .

== See also ==
- Roman Catholicism in Brazil
- Other cathedrals with the name Sacred Heart

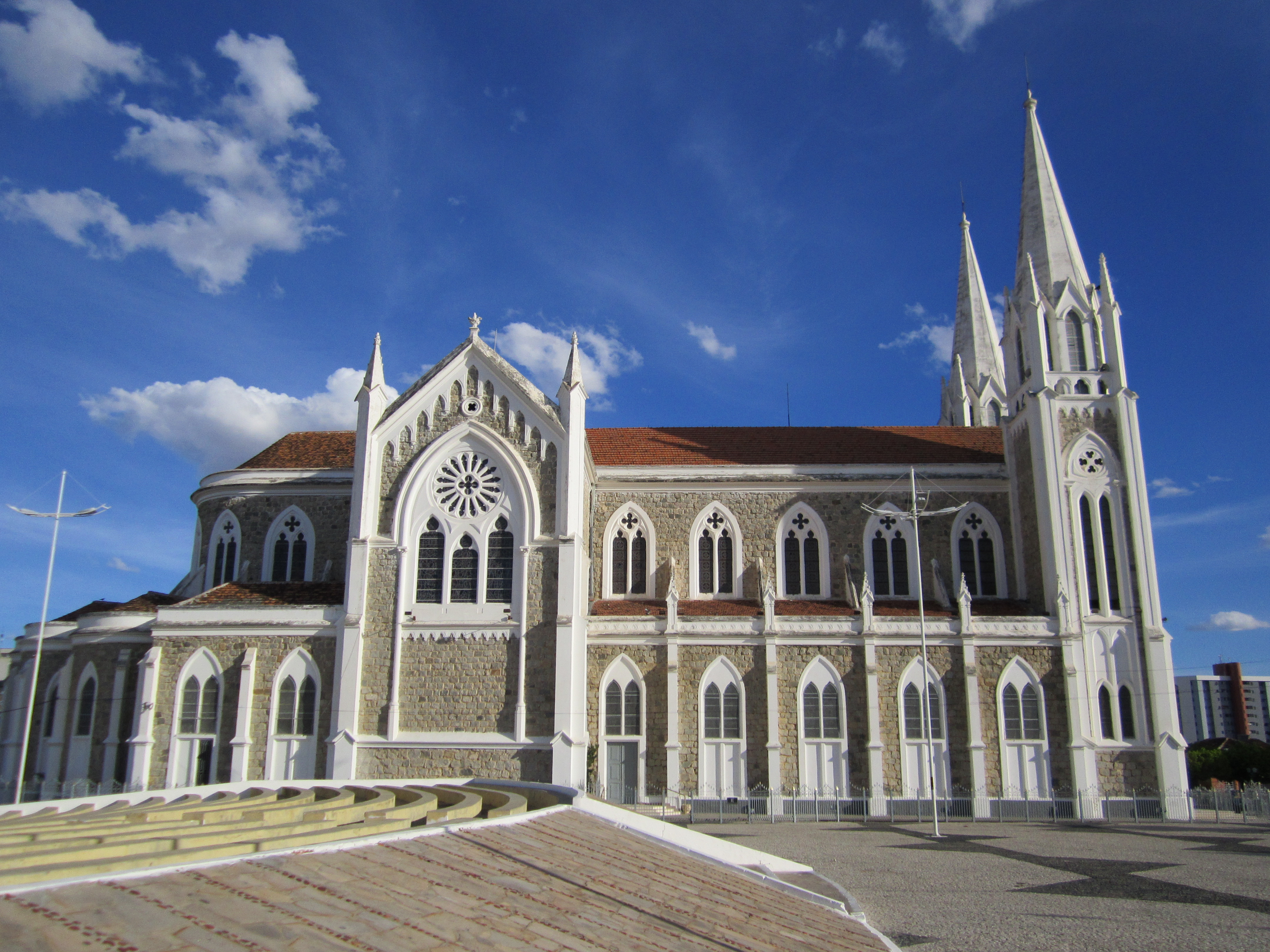
Another View
