= Petrolina =

Municipality of Pernambuco, Brazil

- Municipality
- Municipality of Petrolina
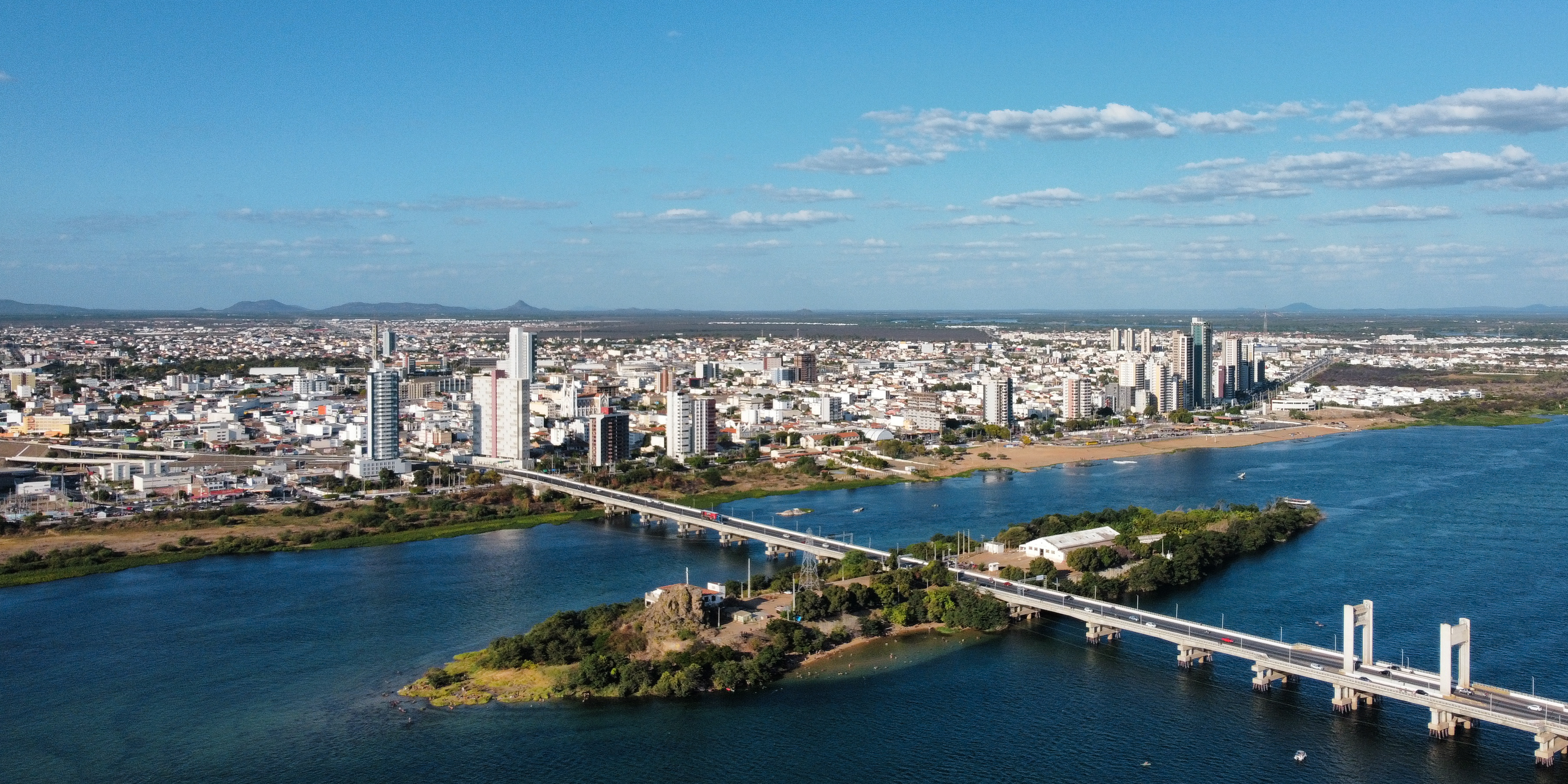
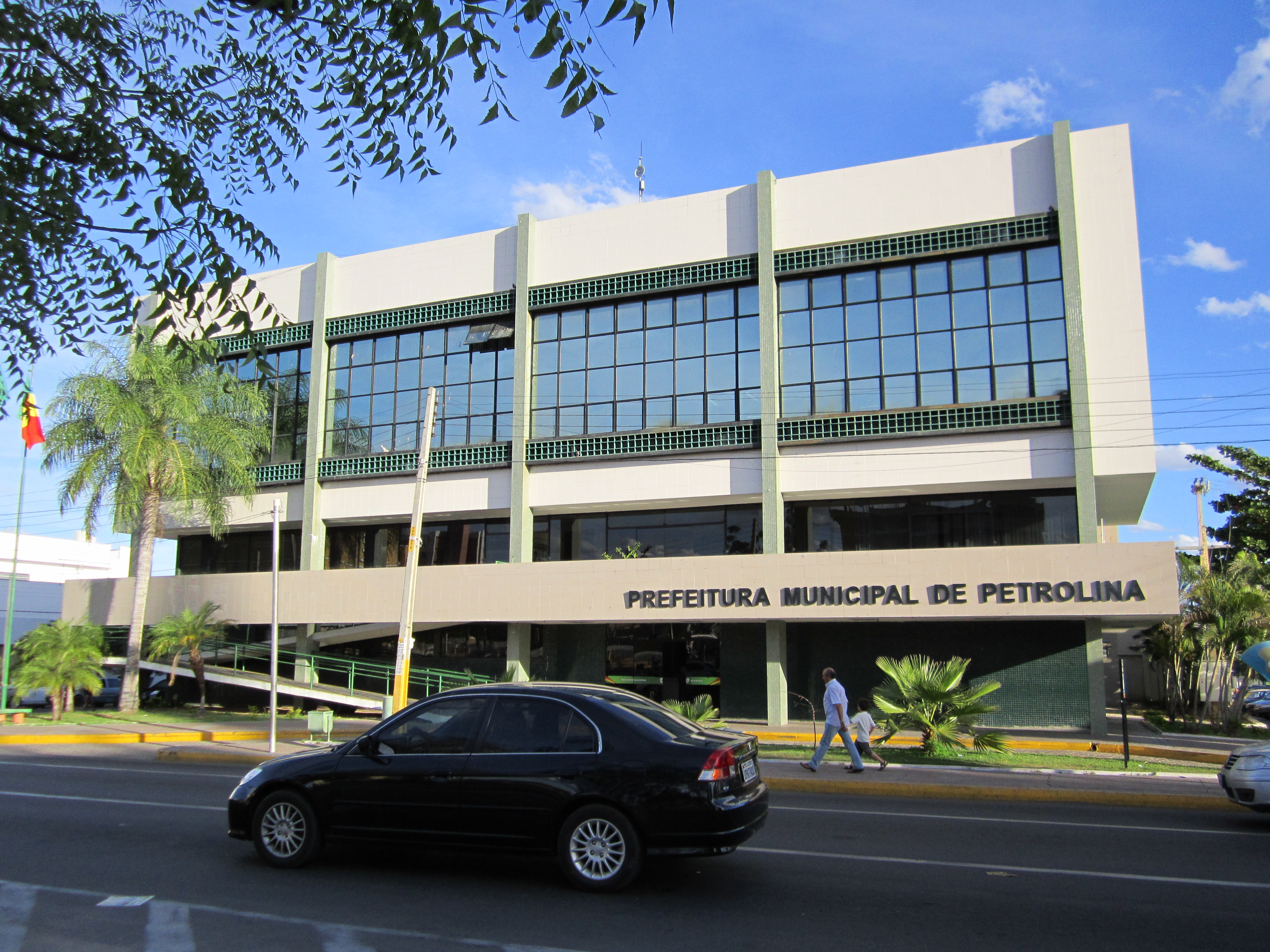
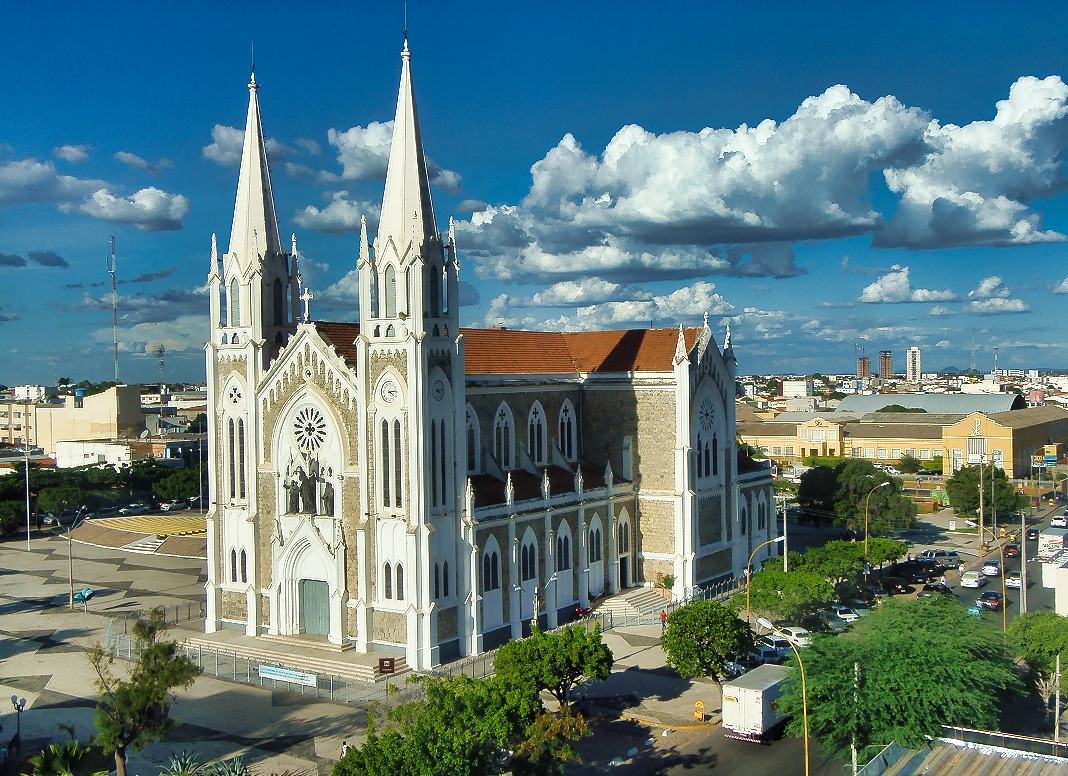
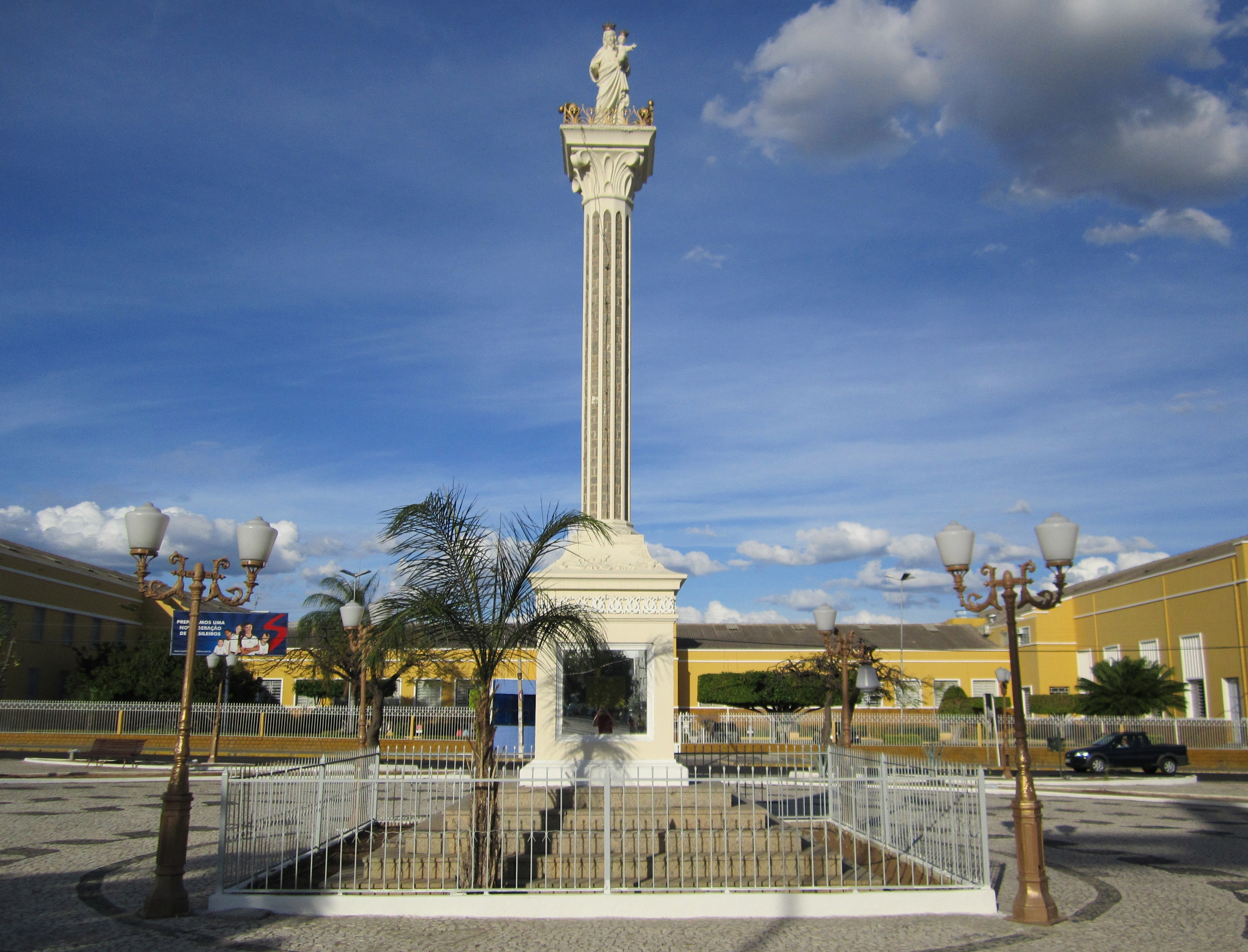
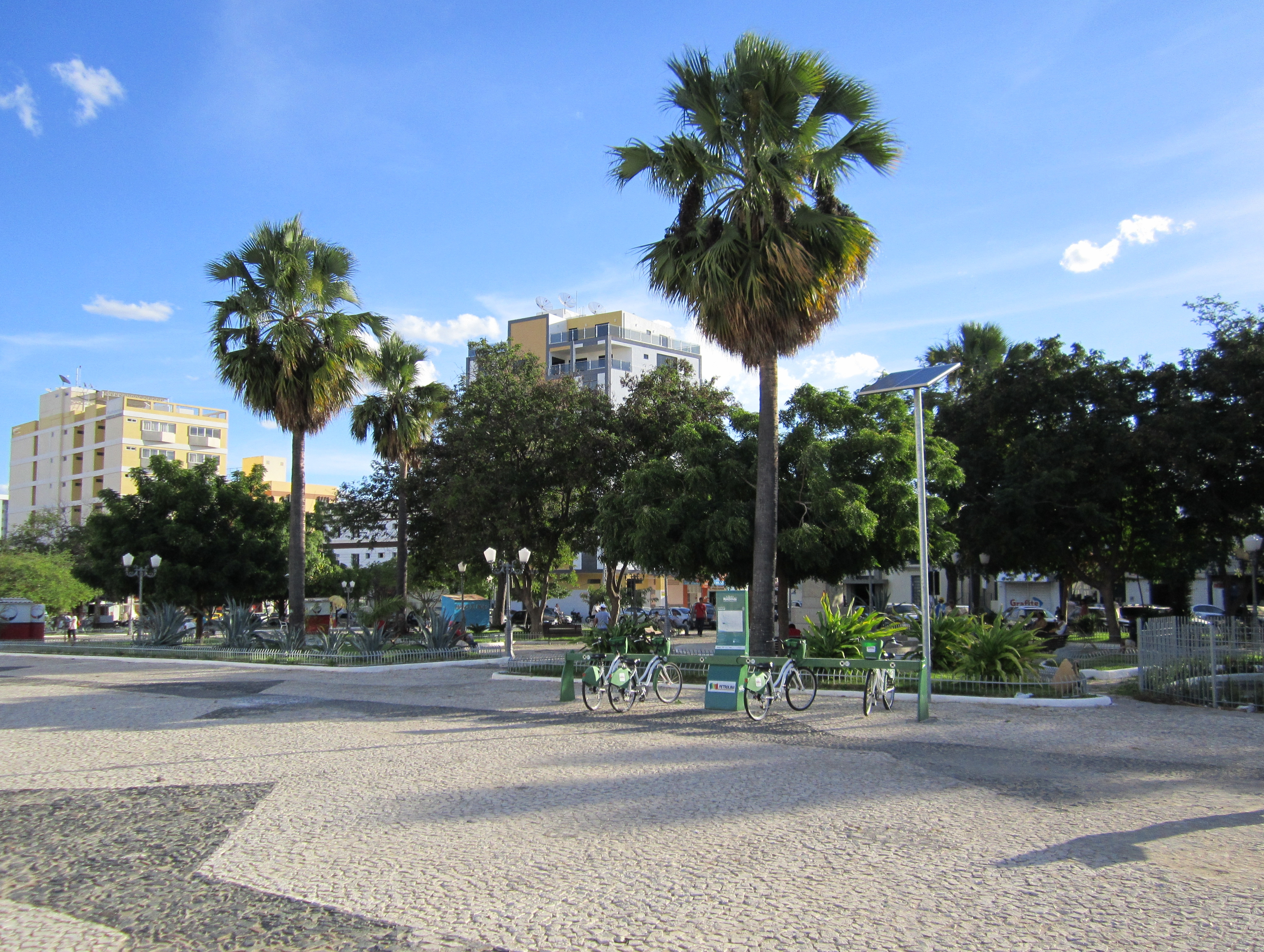
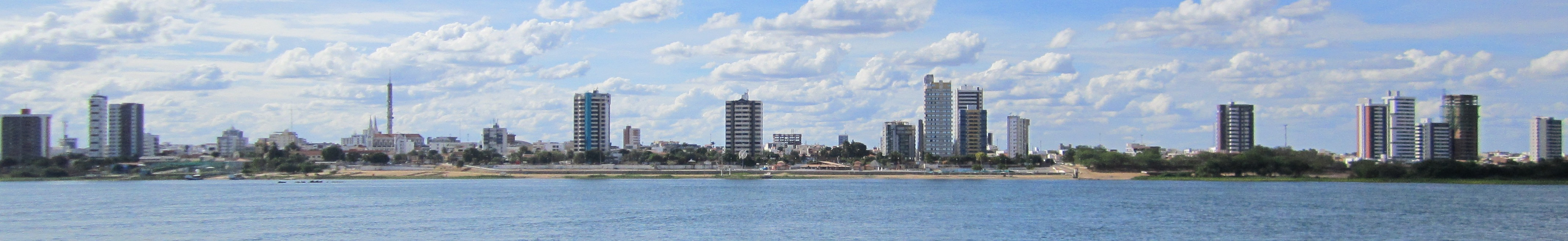

- Flag Coat of arms

- Location in Pernambuco
- Coordinates: 9°22′57″S 40°30′08″W
- Country: Brazil
- Region: Northeast
- State: Pernambuco
- Founded: 1870

Government
  - Mayor: Simão Durando

Area
  - Total: 4,756.8 km^{2} (1,836.6 sq mi)
- Elevation: 376 m (1,234 ft)

Population (2022)
  - Total: 386,791
  - Estimate (2025): 418,444
  - Density: 76.5/km^{2} (198/sq mi)
- Demonym: petrolinense
- Time zone: UTC−3 (BRT)
- Postal code: 56300-001 to 56354-999
- Area code: +55 87
- HDI (2010): 0.697 – medium
- Website: petrolina.pe.gov.br

Petrolina (Central northeastern portuguese pronunciation: [pɛtɾɔˈlinɐ]) is a municipality located in the southernmost point of the state of Pernambuco, in Northeast Brazil, in the valley of the São Francisco River. The population was 418,444 in 2025, and the total area is 4,756.8 km^{2}, making it the largest municipality in the state by area. The municipality is closely integrated with Juazeiro, Bahia, located on the opposite bank of the São Francisco.

== Etymology ==
Formerly called Passagem de Juazeiro (lit. 'Passage of Juazeiro'), there is no single story explaining the origin of the name Petrolina. One theory is that the name was in tribute of Brazilian emperor Pedro I and his consort Leopoldina, while another asserts that Petrolina was named for a 'beautiful rock' (Portuguese: Pedra linda) found on the banks of the São Francisco.

== History ==
The growth of Petrolina and its twin city Juazeiro in the late 20th century is the result of the construction of the Sobradinho Dam and the abundant availability of water for irrigation in these otherwise semi-arid soils. The region is perhaps the only one in the interior of the Northeast that has gained population through in-migration. While the population in the states of Pernambuco and Bahia as a whole increased by 50.1% between 1970 and 1990, it more than doubled in Petrolina-Juazeiro.

For many years the economy of the Valley of the São Francisco was based on extensive cattle ranching and subsistence farming.

Starting in the 1960s with the development policies implemented by the government, the valley soon became the beneficiary of important investments for economic development, translated into the construction of highways, increasing electrical energy, improvement in sanitation systems etc.

Investments made in the agricultural sector with the implantation of the irrigated sections of Bebedouro and Senador Nilo Coelho, in turn brought in the installation of factories connected to the regional agriculture base, especially producers of tomato paste, juices, textiles etc.

Agriculture has grown by leaps and bounds with irrigated farming being the main source of income and jobs in Petrolina. The Petrolina-Juazeiro nucleus has turned into a producer of a wide range of irrigated high-value crops, including table grapes and mangos that are sold fresh by cargo aircraft to Europe and the United States, and other crops for the domestic market, including bananas, coconuts, guavas, passion fruit, melons, industrial tomatoes, watermelons and onions, among others. Due to irrigation, growers in Petrolina-Juazeiro produce 90% of the country's exports of mangos and 30% of table grapes, displacing the states of São Paulo and Rio Grande do Sul as the most important exporters of these products.

== Geography ==
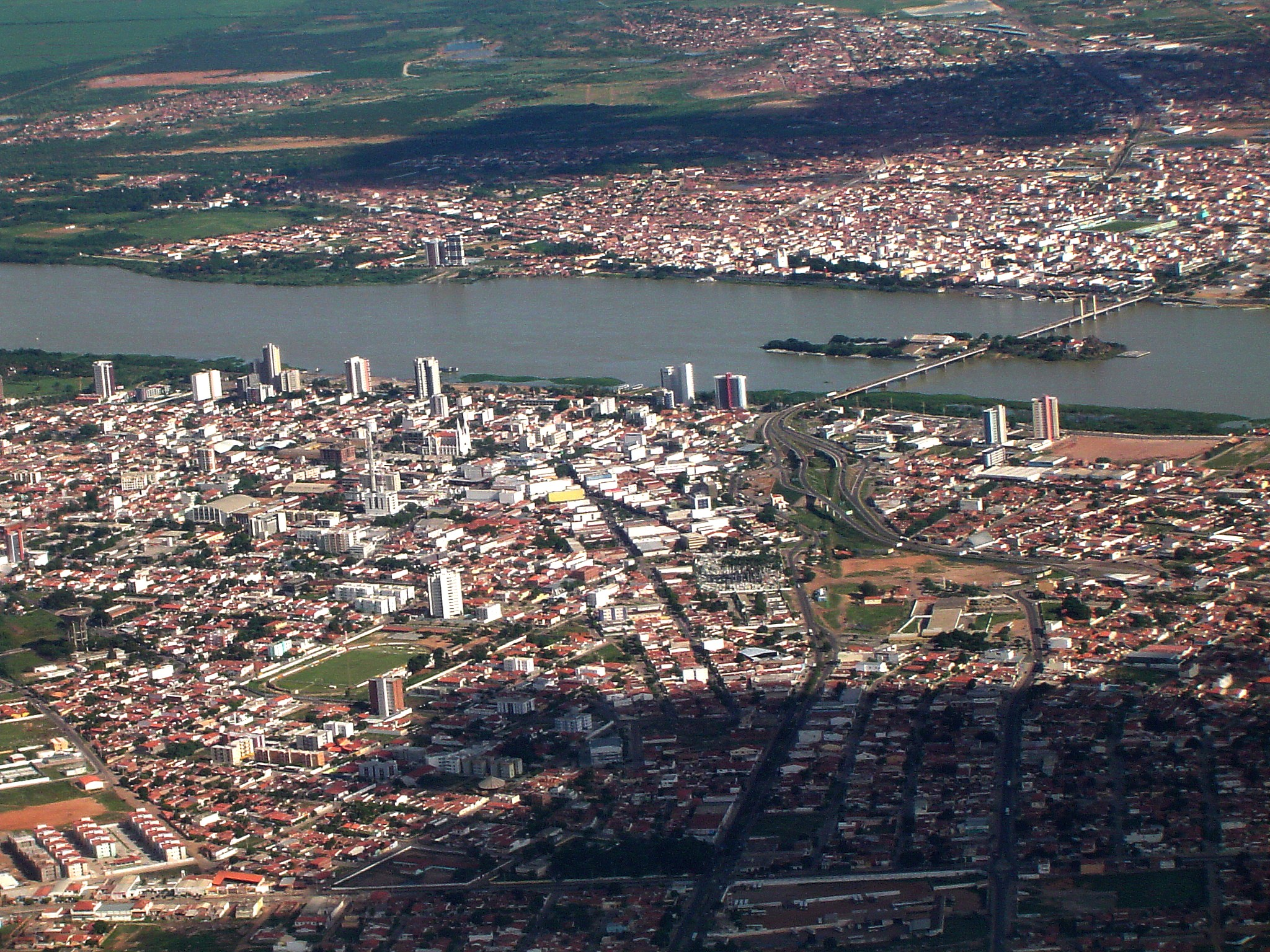
The President Dutra bridge crosses the São Francisco River, connecting Petrolina (foreground) to Juazeiro (background) in Bahia state

Petrolina is situated on the left (northern) bank of the São Francisco River, in the interior semi-arid Sertão subregion, at an elevation of 376 m. On the other side of the river sits Juazeiro, in state of Bahia, and together the cities form an integrated metropolitan area. The two cities, making up an urban area of almost 700,000 people, are connected by the President Dutra Bridge. The Sobradinho Dam is located 26 km up river, and creates the Sobradinho Reservoir, the 34th largest reservoir by volume in the world.

The municipality was designated a priority area for conservation and sustainable use when the Caatinga Ecological Corridor was created in 2006.

=== Distances to other Brazilian cities ===
- Salvador 512 kilometres (318 mi)
- Recife (state capital) 714.4 kilometres (443.9 mi)
- Brasília1,550 kilometres (960 mi)
- Belo Horizonte 1,663 kilometres (1,033 mi)
- Rio de Janeiro 1,927 kilometres (1,197 mi)
- São Paulo 2,246 kilometres (1,396 mi)

=== Climate ===
Petrolina's climate is very hot and dry, being classified as hot semi-arid (Köppen climate classification BSh). Petrolina is located in the semi-arid Sertão belt of the Northeastern Region of Brazil that has a distinctively erratic and seasonal rainfall. The rainy season begins in November and ends in April. After that, the climate is still dry until October, and in many years there is very little rain even during the rainy season.

Climate data for Petrolina (1991–2020)
Month	Jan	Feb	Mar	Apr	May	Jun	Jul	Aug	Sep	Oct	Nov	Dec	Year
Mean daily maximum °C (°F)	33.5 (92.3)	33.2 (91.8)	33.1 (91.6)	32.6 (90.7)	31.6 (88.9)	30.3 (86.5)	29.8 (85.6)	30.8 (87.4)	32.8 (91.0)	34.2 (93.6)	34.3 (93.7)	34.0 (93.2)	32.5 (90.5)
Daily mean °C (°F)	28.2 (82.8)	28.1 (82.6)	28.0 (82.4)	27.6 (81.7)	26.6 (79.9)	25.2 (77.4)	24.6 (76.3)	25.2 (77.4)	26.9 (80.4)	28.5 (83.3)	28.8 (83.8)	28.6 (83.5)	27.2 (81.0)
Mean daily minimum °C (°F)	23.6 (74.5)	23.6 (74.5)	23.8 (74.8)	23.4 (74.1)	22.5 (72.5)	21.1 (70.0)	20.2 (68.4)	20.3 (68.5)	21.3 (70.3)	22.7 (72.9)	23.4 (74.1)	23.7 (74.7)	22.5 (72.5)
Average precipitation mm (inches)	83.5 (3.29)	78.1 (3.07)	83.6 (3.29)	45.8 (1.80)	11.0 (0.43)	5.7 (0.22)	4.5 (0.18)	1.7 (0.07)	2.3 (0.09)	9.2 (0.36)	46.5 (1.83)	47.1 (1.85)	419.0 (16.50)
Average precipitation days (≥ 1.0 mm)	5.5	5.7	6.2	3.6	1.9	1.5	0.9	0.5	0.4	0.9	3.1	4.0	34.2
Average relative humidity (%)	56.8	58.4	59.9	59.9	59.9	60.9	59.1	54.5	49.5	46.7	49.9	54.2	55.8
Average dew point °C (°F)	19.2 (66.6)	19.7 (67.5)	20.0 (68.0)	19.7 (67.5)	18.9 (66.0)	17.8 (64.0)	16.8 (62.2)	16.3 (61.3)	16.5 (61.7)	17.0 (62.6)	18.1 (64.6)	18.9 (66.0)	18.2 (64.8)
Mean monthly sunshine hours	252.7	226.8	245.5	243.5	234.6	226.0	248.8	273.0	279.6	290.6	263.7	264.0	3,048.8
Source: NOAA

== Demographics ==
=== Population ===
Historical population
Year	Pop.	±%
1970	61,252	—
1980	104,297	+70.3%
1991	175,406	+68.2%
2000	218,538	+24.6%
2010	293,962	+34.5%
2020 (estimated)	354,317	+20.5%
Source: Brazilian Institute of Geography and Statistics

As of the last census conducted in 2010, the population was 293,962, of which 219,215 lived in an urban area, with the remaining 74,747 lived in rural areas. As of 2020, the estimated population is 354,317.

Of the population in 2010, 83,360 inhabitants (28.36%) were under the age of 15, 196,957 people were aged between 15 and 64 years (67.00%), 13,645 people were over 65 years of age (4.64%). Life expectancy in the municipality was 73 years and the total fertility rate was 2.2 children per woman. The Human Development Index (HDI) of Petrolina was 0.697, classified as "medium" by the United Nations Development Program (UNDP), sixth highest among the municipalities of the state and the highest in the interior of Pernambuco.

Petrolina and Juazeiro, in Bahia, are part of a metropolitan area called a "Region of Integrated Development" (Brazilian Portuguese: Região Administrativa Integrada de Desenvolvimento), with a population of 686,410 in 2010.

=== Poverty and inequality ===
The poverty line in Brazil is defined in federal government programs as R$140 per month. In 2010, 20.9% of the population lived with an income below the poverty line. Despite a large reduction in this proportion since the year 2000, there were still approximately 60,123 people living in poverty. 79.2% of the population was above the poverty line, 12.5% were between the poverty line and "indigence line" of extreme poverty, defined as monthly income under R$70, and 8.3% were below the indigence line. The Gini coefficient was 0.6253 in 2010.

=== Religion ===
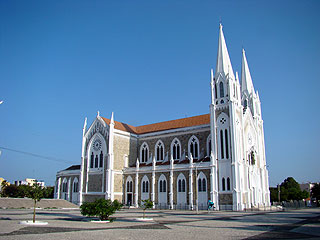
Sacred Heart Cathedral in central Petrolina

The vast majority of Petrolina is Christian, and in particular, Catholic.

According to the 2010 population census, the 73.09% of Petrolina's population identified as Catholic, while 0.69% practiced Spiritism. Evangelicals represent 15.89%, combining all denominations.

About 7.92% declared no religion, including atheists and agnostics. Those who claimed not to have a specific religion or to feel multiple belonging were equivalent to 0.24%.

All other religions were fairly rare: followers of religions of African origin, such as Umbanda and Candomblé, accounted for 0.01% and 0.06% respectively, while 0.01% of the population identified as Buddhist, while no one identified as Muslim or Hindu. Practitioners of esoteric traditions accounted for 0.01% of the population, while only 12 people declared themselves adepts of spiritualism.

The Sacred Heart Cathedral in Petrolina was dedicated in 1929, and is the seat of the Roman Catholic Diocese of Petrolina, in the ecclesiastical province of Olinda and Recife.

== Politics and government ==
The municipality is headed by a mayor (Brazilian Portuguese: Prefeito/Prefeita), overseen by a city council (Câmara Municipal) that passes laws. The current mayor is Simão Durando of the Brazil Union party, first taking office in 2022 (after the resignation of Miguel Coelho, who resigned to run for Governor of Pernamubco), and being re-elected in 2024.

== Economy ==
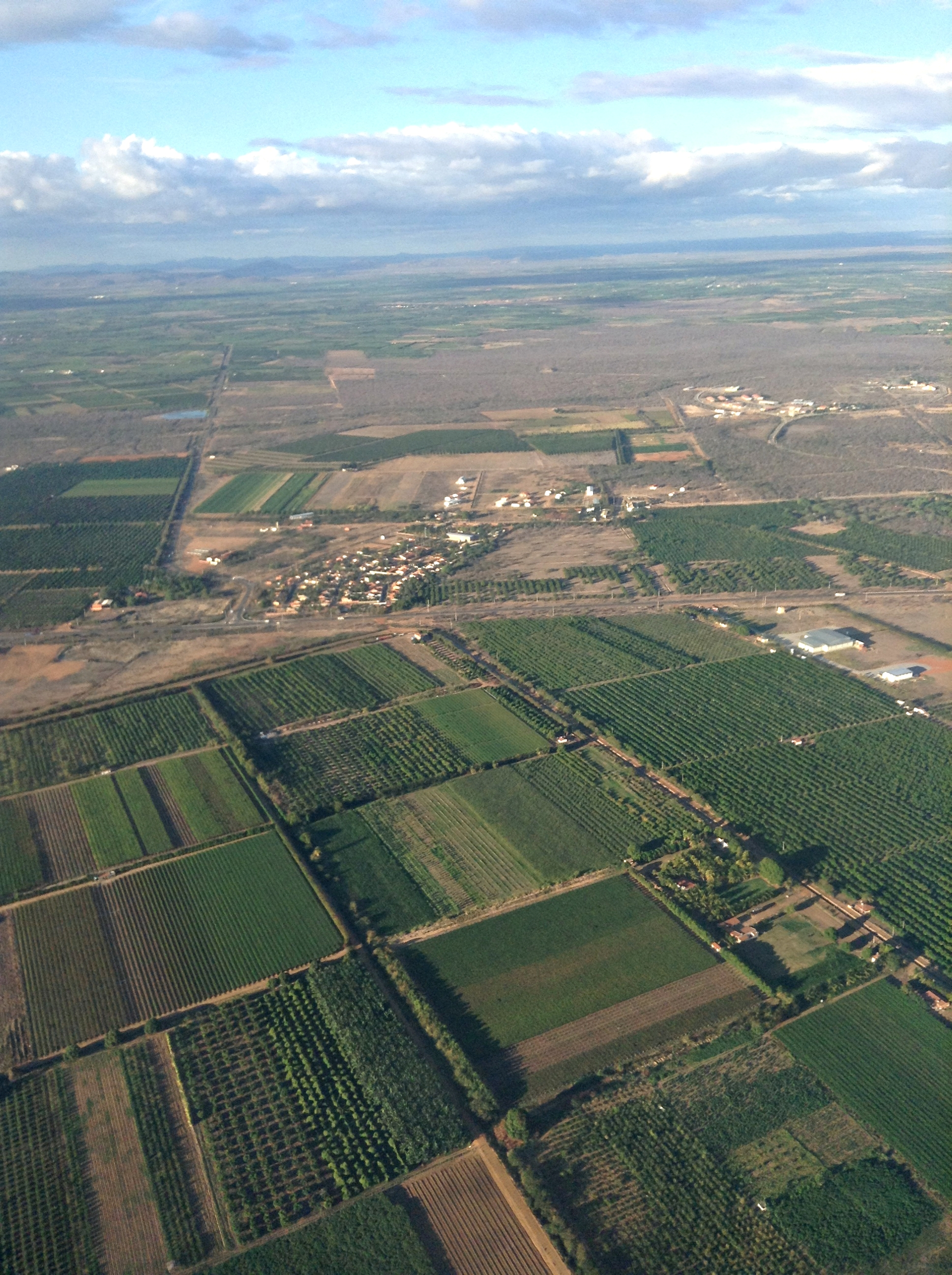
Fruit farming in Petrolina, irrigated by water from the São Francisco

The main economic activities in Petrolina are irrigated agriculture and its related industries. Main crops in tons (2007)

- Mangos - 146,000
- Grapes - 112,200
- Guava - 67,760
- Banana - 45,000
- Coconut - 36,400 in thousands

There is also a substantial number of animals as of 2007, as follows:

- Goats - 99,500
- Sheep - 57,200
- Cattle- 29,200
- Pigs - 16,200
- Donkeys - 10,400
- Mules - 2,100
- Horses - 1,750

=== Economic indicators ===
Population	GDP (in thousands of Brazilian Reais (R$)).	GDP per capita (R$)	Percent of Pernambuco GDP
294,081	2,375,492	8,601	3.37%

Economy by Sector 2006

Primary sector	Secondary sector	Service sector
22.79%	14.05%	63.16%

== Infrastructure ==
=== Education ===
As of 2014, there were 185 elementary schools, and 56 high schools. Petrolina hosts campuses of the Federal University of Vale do São Francisco and the University of Pernambuco, as well as private universities.

=== Health ===
Health indicators are as follows:

HDI (2010)	Hospitals (2015)	Hospital beds (2015)	Infant mortality rate per 1000 live births (2017)
0.697	6	323	15.3

=== Transport ===
Petrolina is on national highway BR-407, connecting Feira de Santana, near Salvador, and Picos located in the state of Piauí. Juazeiro, across the São Francisco River, is served by the Ferrovia Centro-Atlântica rail line, which is used only for freight. Petrolina Airport serves mainly regional flights (with flights to Recife, São Paulo, and Salvador) and international cargo flights of fresh fruit.

== See also ==
- List of municipalities in Pernambuco
