= Spanish Brazilians =

Spanish Brazilians Hispano-brasileiros Hispano-brasileños
Total population
- c. 15 million 8% of the population (2008)

Regions with significant populations
- Mainly Southeastern Brazil (particularly São Paulo and Rio de Janeiro)

Languages
- Iberian Spanish, Brazilian Portuguese, Other Spanish languages

Religion
- Catholicism, some Protestantism

Related ethnic groups
- White Brazilians; Other Brazilians

Spanish Brazilians are Brazilians of full or partial Spanish ancestry.

Spanish immigration was the third largest among immigrant groups in Brazil; about 750,000 immigrants entered Brazil from Spanish ports. How many Spaniards came to Brazil before independence are unknown. Brazilian censuses do not research "ethnic origins" or ancestry, which makes it very difficult to give accurate numbers of Brazilians of Spanish descent. Brazilians of Spanish descent can be estimated as being 1.5 million people in the 6 main metropolitan areas (around 5% of their total population in 1998) or 10 and 15 million in the whole country, according to Brazilian media and the Spanish government respectively.

== History ==
=== Colonial Brazil ===
More than half of modern Brazil's territory was attributed to Spain by the Treaty of Tordesillas. However, Spain was unable to settle that region.

During the dynastic union between Portugal and Spain (1580–1640), many Spaniards settled in Brazil, particularly in São Paulo. As a consequence, there are a large number of Brazilian descendants of these early settlers, especially since the early inhabitants of São Paulo explored and settled in other parts of Brazil. The descendants of Bartolomeu Bueno de Ribeira, born in Seville around 1555, who settled in São Paulo around 1583, marrying Maria Pires, are an example of this. Afonso Taunay, in his book dealing with early São Paulo, São Paulo in the XVI century, mentions also Baltazar de Godoy, Francisco de Saavedra, Jusepe de Camargo, Martin Fernandes Tenório de Aguilar, Bartolomeu de Quadros, among others. In his genealogical account of the settling of São Paulo, Pedro Taques de Almeida Paes Leme, also mentions the three Rendon brothers, Juan Matheus Rendon, Francisco Rendon de Quebedo and Pedro Matheus Rendon Cabeza de Vaca, as well as Diogo Lara, from Zamora. Spaniards from Galicia also settled in Brazil during that time, like Jorge de Barros, for example. The family names Bueno, Godoy, Lara, Saavedra, Camargo, etc., tracing back to these early settlers, are quite popular throughout Southeast Brazil, Southern Brazil and the Center-West. Silva Leme, in his work Genealogia Paulistana ("Paulistana Genealogy"), addresses several of these families.

The expansion of Portuguese-Brazilian settlements into Spanish-claimed territory was a long and gradual process, which took the form of Portuguese-Brazilian expeditions and settlements led by the Bandeirantes. Except for the Missions, no Spanish settlements actually existed in the territory of future Brazil by the middle of the 18th century, when most of it was under Portuguese control. This de facto control was legally recognized in 1750 when sovereignty over the vast area – including the Missions – was transferred from Spain to Portugal by the Treaty of Madrid.

While there is no historic evidence of Spanish settlements in the area that is now Rio Grande do Sul (other than São Gabriel, founded in 1800 and stormed by the Brazilian/Portuguese in 1801), some genetic research conducted on southern Brazilian gaúchos suggests that they may be mostly descended from mixed indigenous and Spanish ancestry rather than from Portuguese and indigenous ancestry. The study itself cautions that there may be difficulties with its identification of the respective Iberian (Portuguese and Spanish) contributions to the gaúcho population of southern Brazil (some caution is warranted because differentiation between Iberian Peninsula populations, as well as between them and their derived Latin American populations, at the Y-chromosome level, was not observed in other investigations).

=== Immigration ===
Spanish emigration to South America peaked in the late 19th and early 20th centuries, and it was concentrated to Argentina and Cuba. Between 1882 and 1930, 3,297,312 Spaniards emigrated, of whom 1,594,622 went to Argentina and 1,118,960 went to Cuba. Brazil only started to be an important destination for immigrants from Spain in the 1880s, and the country received the third largest number of immigrants from that country, after Argentina and Cuba.

It is estimated that approximately 750,000 Spaniards have immigrated to Brazil since Brazil's independence in 1822. This figure represents between 12.5% and 14% of all foreigners entering Brazil since its independence and puts the Spaniards in the third place among immigrant nationalities in Brazil, but it possibly includes Portuguese emigrating on false Spanish passports, or Galicians who, while Spanish citizens, spoke a language similar to Portuguese; in fact, Portuguese immigrants in Rio de Janeiro are popularly known as galegos (Galicians). Most Spanish immigrants entered Brazil between 1880 and 1930, with the peak period between 1905 and 1919, when their annual entrances overcame those of Italians.

==== Origins and destinations ====
In the state of São Paulo, the destination of the majority of Spanish immigrants (about 75% of the total), 60% were from Andalusia, had their travel by ship paid by the Brazilian government, emigrated in families and were taken to the coffee farms to replace African slave manpower.

Spanish Immigration to São Paulo - Percentage by Region
| Region | 1893-1902 | 1903-1912 | 1913-1922 |
|---|---|---|---|
| Andalusia | 43,6 | 53% | 50% |
| Aragon | 0,8% | 2,0% | 1,4% |
| Asturias | 1,1% | 0,4% | 0,7% |
| Balearic Islands | 0,2% | 0,4% | 0,3% |
| Basque Country | 2,9% | 1,0% | 1,0% |
| Canary Islands | 2,0% | 0,7% | 0,3% |
| Cantabria | 0,3% | 0,1% | 0,2% |
| Castille and León | 10,4% | 12% | 10,6% |
| Castile-La Mancha | 1,1% | 1,2% | 3,0% |
| Catalonia | 6,9% | 2,3% | 1,8% |
| Extremadura | 0,7% | 1,2% | 6,2% |
| Galicia | 22,6% | 14,5% | 10,3% |
| Madrid | 1,9% | 0,7% | 0,7% |
| Murcia | 0,7% | 5,2% | 8,5% |
| Navarra | 1,3% | 2,0% | 0,9% |
| Valencia | 2,1% | 1,9% | 1,8% |
| La Rioja | 0,7% | 0,6% | 0,9% |
| Others | 0,7% | 0,8% | 1,4% |

After São Paulo, the second largest contingent came to Rio de Janeiro, while other states such as Minas Gerais, Rio Grande do Sul, Paraná, Mato Grosso, Pará and Bahia received smaller groups. In all those states, immigrants from Galicia were the vast majority, at about 80%, and those were predominantly males who emigrated alone, settled in urban centers and paid for their travel by ship. Galician smallholders settled mainly in urban areas of Brazil. Starting in the early 20th century, most Spanish immigrants were Andalusian peasants who worked in the coffee plantations, mainly in rural areas of São Paulo State.

Spaniards in São Paulo City
| Year | Percentage of the City |
|---|---|
| 1900 | 12% |
| 1920 | 4,3% |

==== The Galegos ====
In Northeastern Brazil, people with light or blue eyes or light colored hair are often called galegos (Galicians), even if not of Galician descent, probably explained due to the fact Galicians came to Brazil among Portuguese colonizers. In Rio de Janeiro, the Galician immigrants were so present that Iberian and Portuguese immigrants were referred to as galegos.

==== Numbers of immigrants ====
Spanish immigration to Brazil
Period
| 1884–1893 | 1894–1903 | 1904–1913 | 1914–1923 | 1924–1933 | 1945–1949 | 1950–1954 | 1955–1959 |
| 113,116 | 102,142 | 224,672 | 94,779 | 52,405 | 40,092 | 53,357 | 38,819 |
Source: (IBGE)

== Notable people ==
- Clóvis Bornay
- Amador Bueno
- Pedro Casaldáliga (Catalan born)
- Raul Cortez
- Mário Covas
- Millôr Fernandes
- Daniel Filho
- Raul Gil
- Domingo García y Vásquez
- José Mojica Marins
- Gal Costa
- André Franco Montoro
- Marco Luque
- Jaime Oncins
- Oscarito
- Nélida Piñon (of Galician descent)
- Roberto Salmeron
- Ivete Sangalo
- Tonico & Tinoco
- Drauzio Varella
- Heitor Villa-Lobos
- Boison Wynney

== Education ==
There is one Spanish international school in Brazil, Colégio Miguel de Cervantes in São Paulo.

== See also ==
- Brazil–Spain relations
- Immigration to Brazil
- White Brazilian
- White Latin American
