= Brazil–Spain relations =

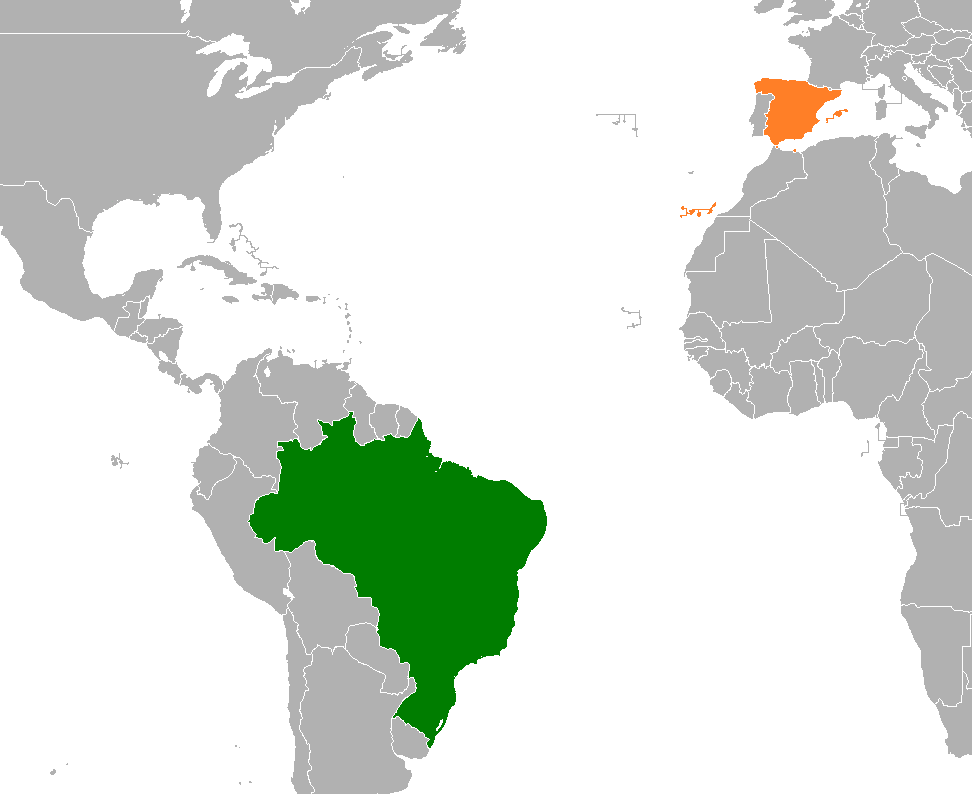
- Brazil: Spain

Brazil–Spain relations are the current and historical relations between Brazil and Spain. Both nations are members of the Organization of Ibero-American States.

== History ==
Following the beginning of the European exploration of the Americas, representatives of the monarchs of Portugal and Spain signed the Treaty of Tordesillas in 1494 which divided between both crowns the newly discovered lands outside of Europe along meridian 370 leagues. After 1580, in the wake of the incorporation of the Kingdom of Portugal to the Hispanic Monarchy (see Iberian Union), the Portuguese overseas territories became part of the Habsburg crown, in which the Council of Portugal came to hold a position of primacy over the viceroy in the polysynodial system through which the monarchy operated (even though below the Council of State). The union lasted until 1640 after the Portuguese Restoration War.

In 1834, Spain recognized the independence of Brazil and both nations established diplomatic relations. Spain soon opened a diplomatic legation in Rio de Janeiro. In 1871, Brazilian Emperor Pedro II visited Spain and met with Spanish King Amadeo I. Beginning in the 1880s until the 1930s, a wave of Spanish migrants arrived to Brazil as it was the only South American nation without immigration quotas at the time. More than 1 million Spanish migrants would arrive to Brazil.

During the Spanish Civil War (1936-1939), 30 Brazilian citizens partook in the fighting for the Second Spanish Republic and formed part of the International Brigade. In 1939, Brazilian President Getúlio Vargas donated 600 tons of coffee beans to Spain which were then sold by General Francisco Franco for 7.5 million pesetas (equivalent to €85 million Euros).

In May 1983, Spanish King Juan Carlos I paid his first visit to Brazil. The King would visit the country three more times before his abdication in 2014. In November 2012, Brazilian President Dilma Rousseff paid an official visit to Spain. The visit was reciprocated in April 2017 by Spanish Prime Minister Mariano Rajoy.

=== Diplomatic incidents ===
In 2023, the Brazilian government summoned the Spanish ambassador to explain racist comments hurled by fans at soccer player Vinícius Júnior, and its foreign ministry said in a statement that after "yet another inadmissible episode" it had concluded that effective measures had not been taken by the Spanish authorities to prevent such acts of racism.

== High-level visits ==
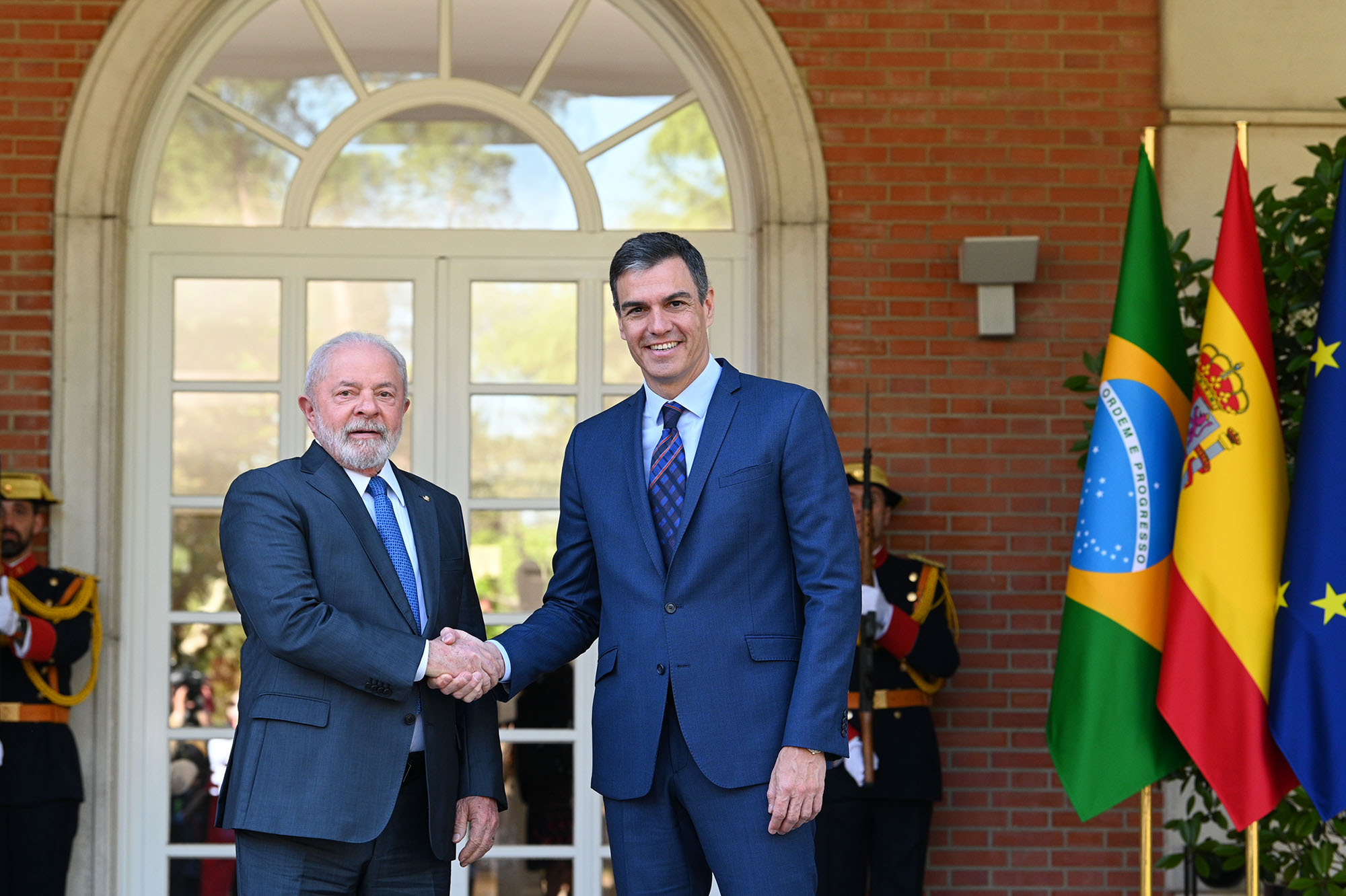
Spanish Prime Minister Pedro Sánchez and Brazilian President Luiz Inácio Lula da Silva in Madrid; April 2023.

Royal and Presidential visits from Brazil to Spain

- Emperor Pedro II of Brazil (1871, 1887)
- President João Figueiredo (1984)
- President Fernando Collor de Mello (1991, 1992)
- President Fernando Henrique Cardoso (1998)
- President Luiz Inácio Lula da Silva (July and October 2003, 2005, 2007, 2008, 2010, 2023, 2026)
- President Dilma Rousseff (2012)

Royal and Prime Ministerial visits from Spain to Brazil

- Prime Minister Adolfo Suárez (1979)
- King Juan Carlos I (1983, 1993, 2000, 2012)
- Prime Minister Felipe González (1987, 1993, 1995)
- Prime Minister José María Aznar (1997, 2003)
- Prime Minister José Luis Rodríguez Zapatero (2005, 2008)
- Crowned Prince Felipe (2014)
- Prime Minister Mariano Rajoy (2017)
- King Felipe VI (2023)
- Prime Minister Pedro Sánchez (March and November 2024, 2025)

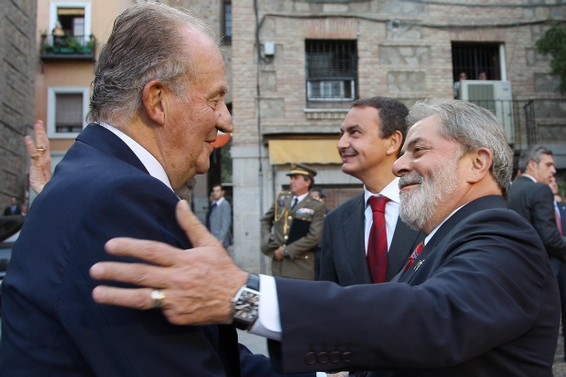
King Juan Carlos I, Prime Minister José Luis Rodríguez Zapatero and President Luiz Inácio Lula da Silva in Toledo, Spain; October 2008.

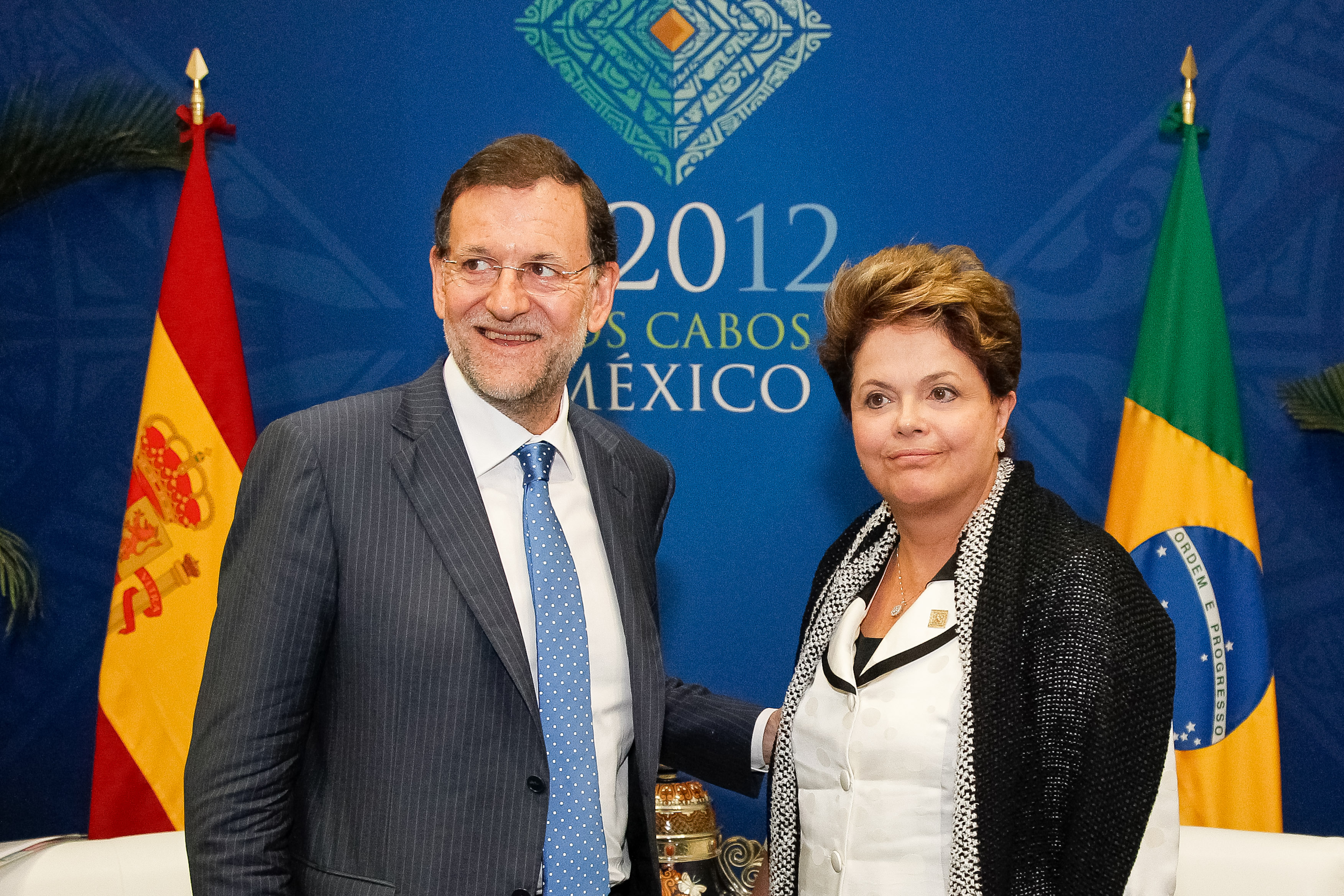
President Dilma Rousseff and Prime Minister Mariano Rajoy in Los Cabos, Mexico; June 2012.

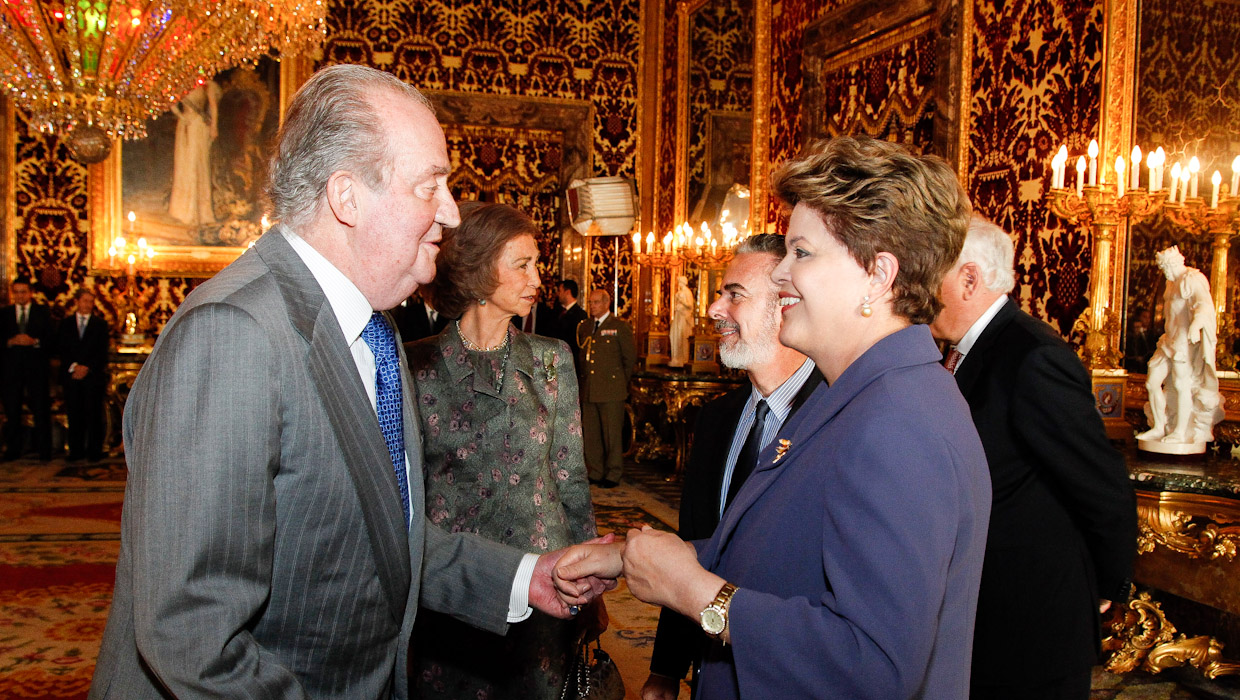
King Juan Carlos I and President Dilma Rousseff in Madrid; November 2012.

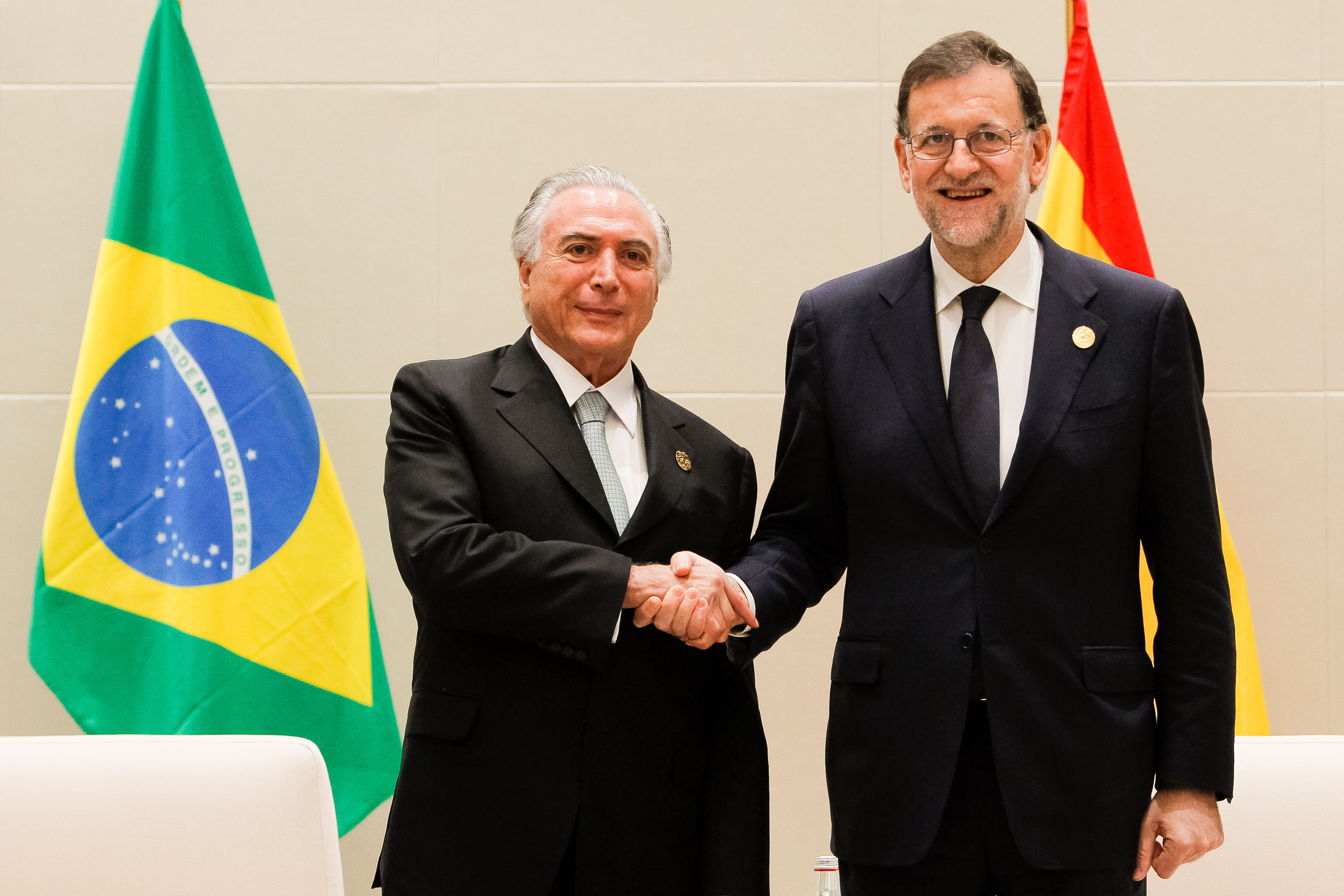
President Michel Temer and Prime Minister Mariano Rajoy in Hangzhou, China; September 2016.

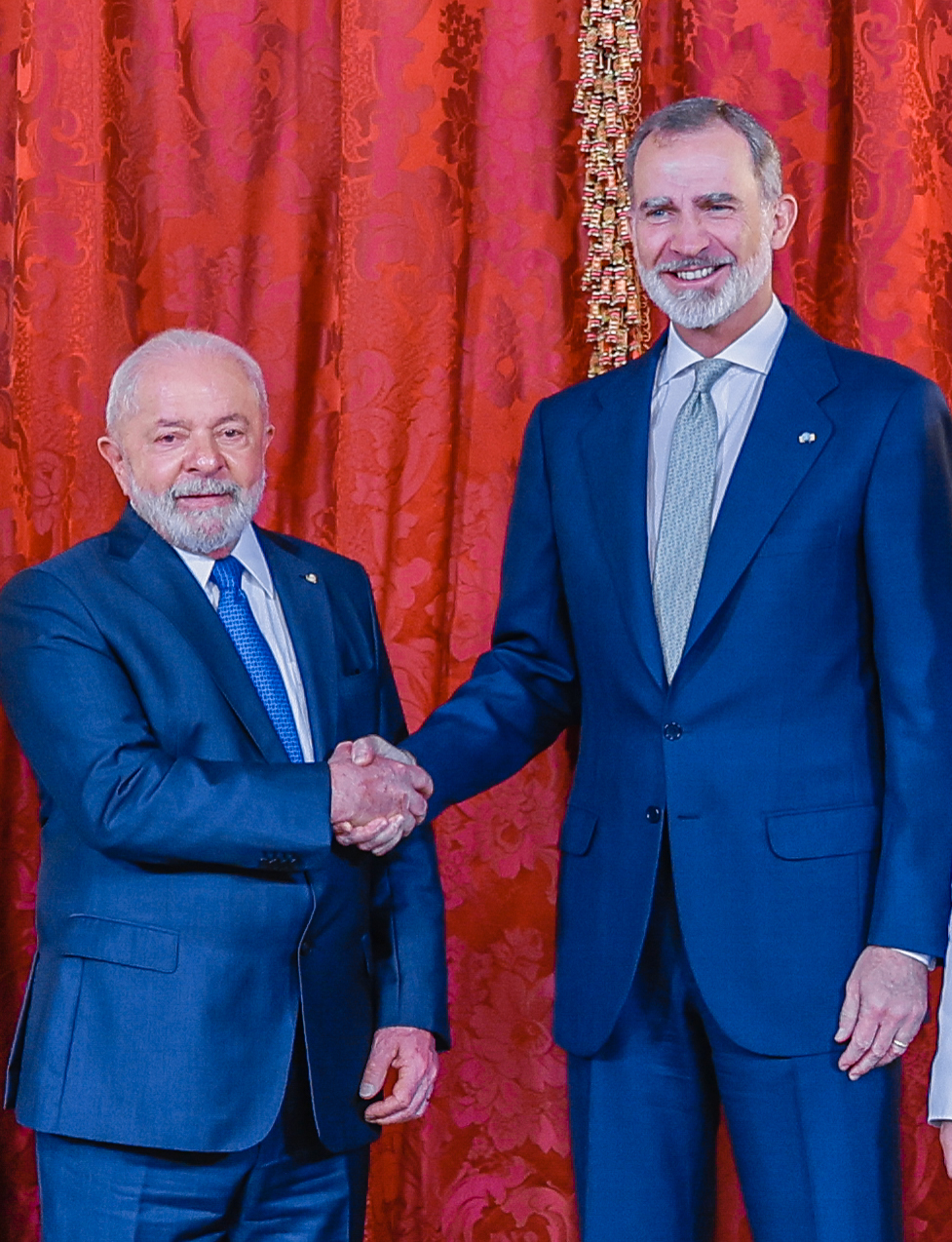
President Luiz Inácio Lula da Silva and King Felipe VI in Madrid; April 2023.

== Migration ==
Today, more than 15 million Brazilians are of Spanish descent. In 2015, 133,000 Spanish citizens resided in Brazil, making it the fourth biggest Spanish expat community in Latin America. That same year, 130,000 Brazilian citizens resided in Spain.

== Cultural cooperation ==
Brazil hosts a Spain House in Rio de Janeiro and a Spanish Cultural Center in Curitiba, while Spain hosts a Brazil House in Madrid and a Brazilian Cultural Center in Barcelona. In addition, Brazil hosts Institutos Cervantes in Belo Horizonte, Brasília, Curitiba, Porto Alegre, Recife, Rio de Janeiro, Salvador da Bahia and São Paulo, being the country with the largest number of Institutos in the world.

Since 1984, the twinning between the cities of Rio de Janeiro (Brazil) and Santa Cruz de Tenerife (Spain) was established. Mainly, due to the popularity and tourist attraction of its carnivals, which aspire to become an intangible cultural heritage. Likewise, in 2022, tours of flamenco artists to Brazil were promoted.

== Agreements ==
Both nations have signed numerous agreements and treaties such as an Agreement on the Exchange of Diplomatic Pouches (1919); Agreement on Air Transportation (1949); Cultural Agreement (1960); Migration Agreement (1960); Agreement on the Elimination of Tourist Visas (1965); Agreement on the Avoidance of Double-Taxation (1975); Agreement of Cooperation on the use of Nuclear Energy for Peaceful Purposes (1983); Extradition Treaty (1990); Agreement of Prisoner Exchange (1998); Agreement on Cooperation in the fight against Organized Crime (2007) and a Defense Agreement (2010).

== Transport ==
There are direct flights between Brazil and Spain through the following airlines: Air Europa, Iberia and LATAM Brasil.

== Trade ==
In 2025, trade between Brazil and Spain totaled €11 billion Euros. As of 2020, Spain's main exports to Brazil included: fuel and mineral oils; machinery and mechanical appliances; electrical appliances and equipment; other chemical products and organic chemical products; whereas Brazil's exports to Spain included fuels, mineral oil; seeds and oleaginous fruits, industrial plants; ores, slag and ash; cereals and food industry wastes. In 2020, Spain exported goods to Brazil amounting to 2,257.5 million euros (18th largest destination of Spanish exports), whereas Brazil exported goods to Spain amounting to 3,515.4 million euros. In 2020, Spain exported services to Brazil amounting to 733 million dollars (6th largest service provider to Brazil) whereas Brazil exported services to Spain amounting to 280 million dollars.

Spain is Brazil's 16th largest trading partner globally. Spain is Brazil's third largest foreign investor and in 2015, Spain had US$5 billion worth of investments in the country. Brazilian multinational company Embraer operates in Spain. Spanish multinational companies such as Banco Santander, Mapfre, Repsol, Telefónica and Zara operate in Brazil.

== Resident diplomatic missions ==
of Brazil in Spain

- Madrid (Embassy)
- Madrid (Consulate-General)
- Barcelona (Consulate-General)

of Spain in Brazil

- Brasília (Embassy)
- Porto Alegre (Consulate-General)
- Rio de Janeiro (Consulate-General)
- Salvador da Bahia (Consulate-General)
- São Paulo (Consulate-General)

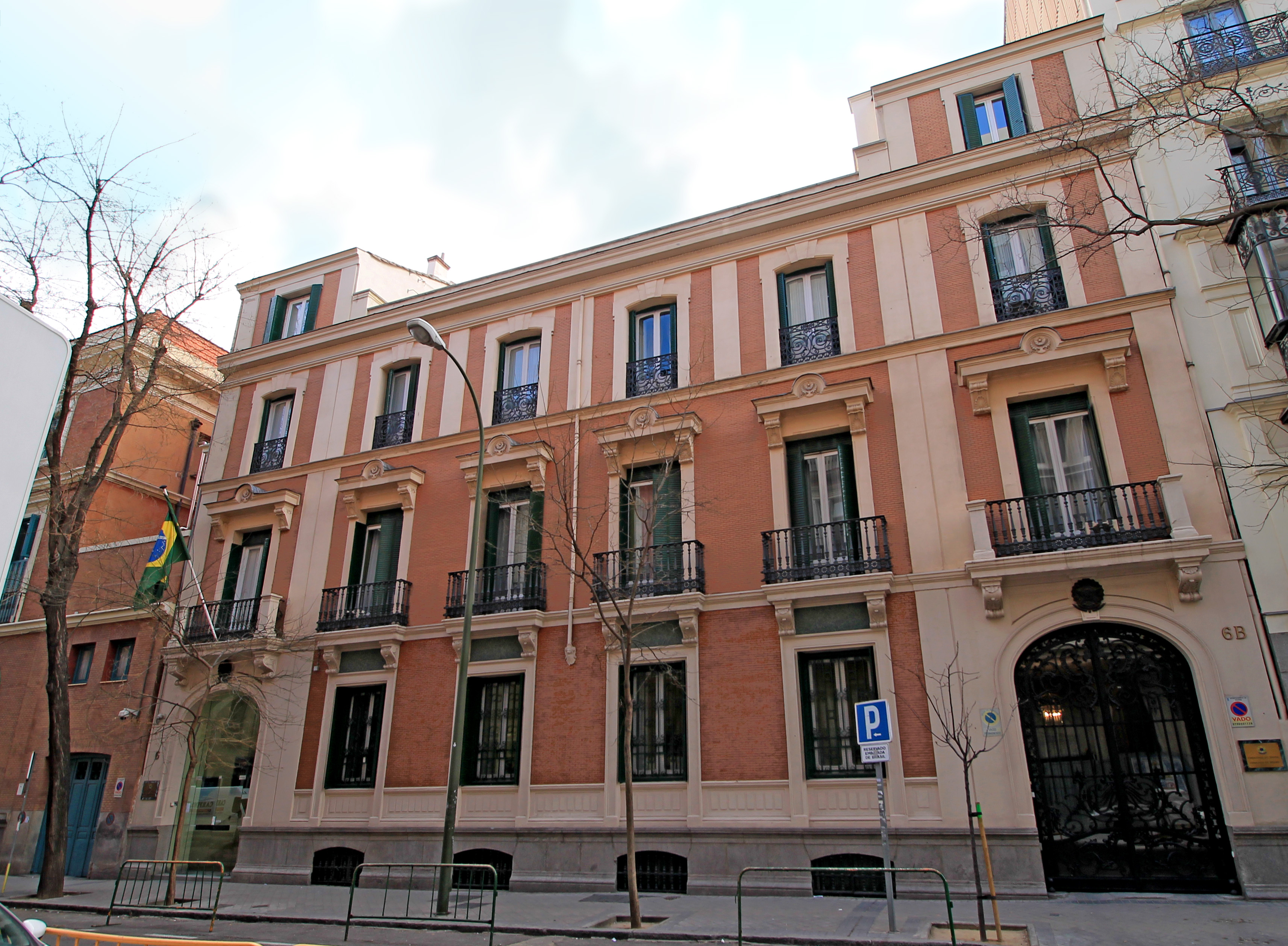
Embassy of Brazil in Madrid

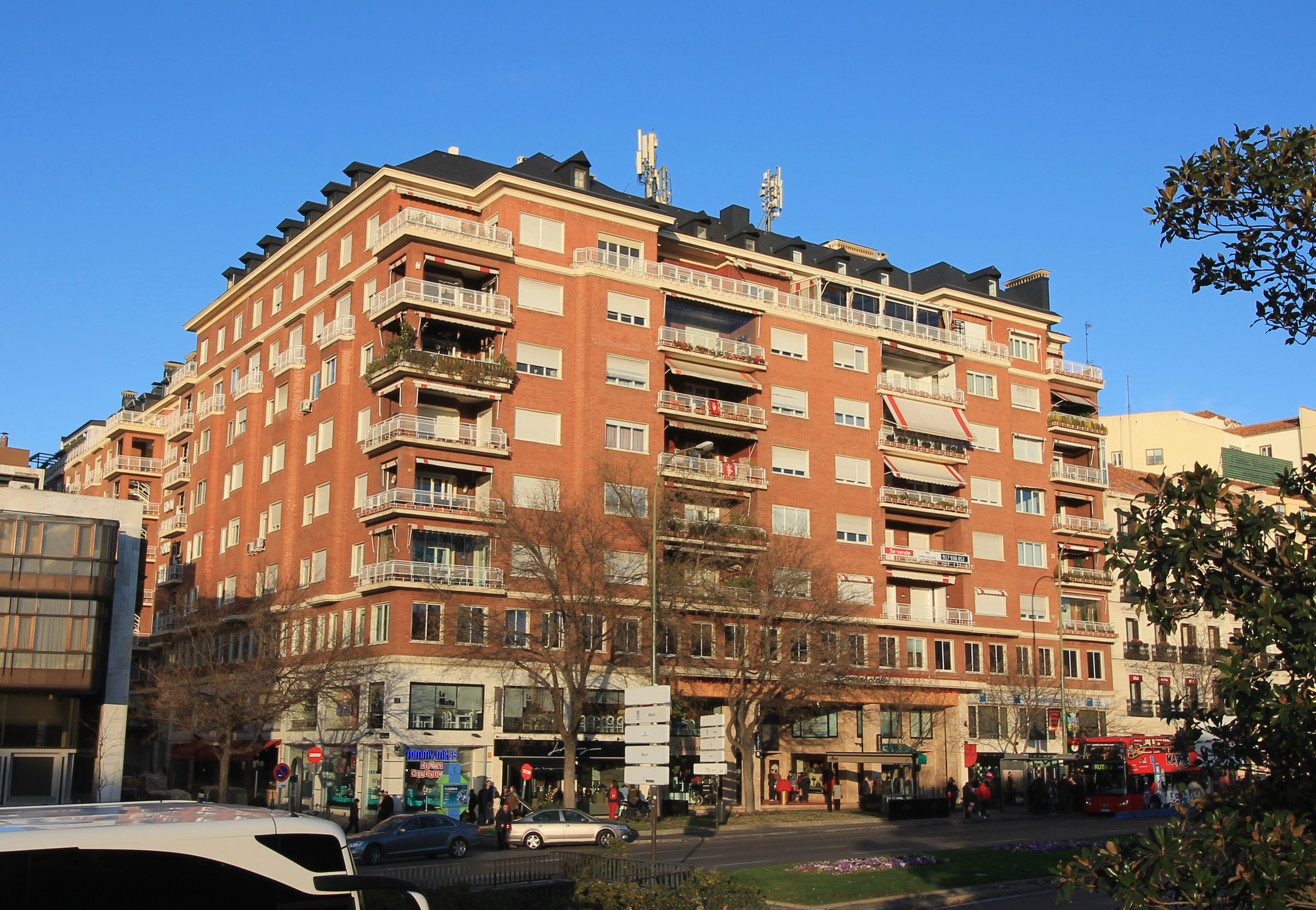
Building hosting the Consulate-General of Brazil in Madrid

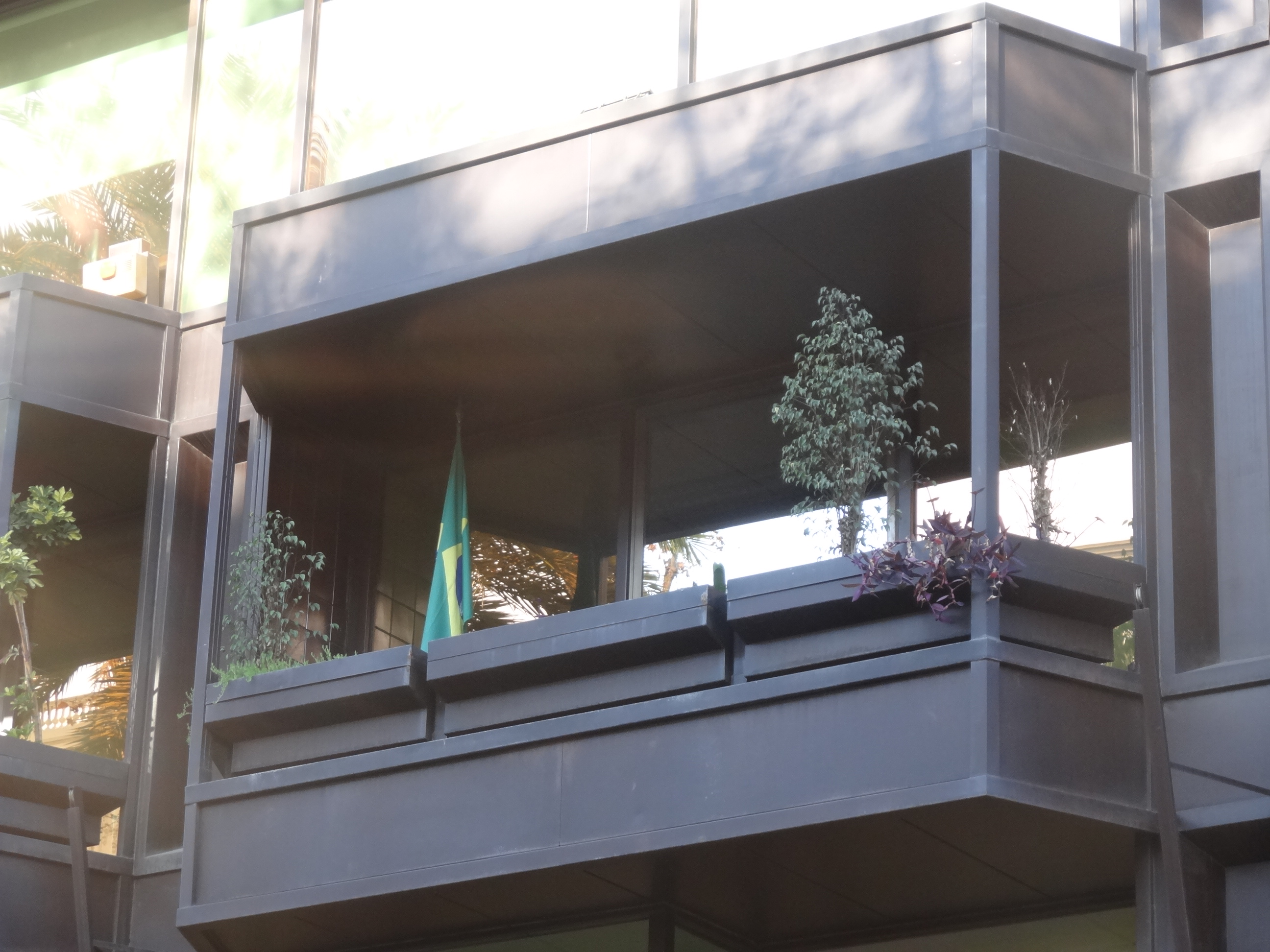
Consulate-General of Brazil in Barcelona
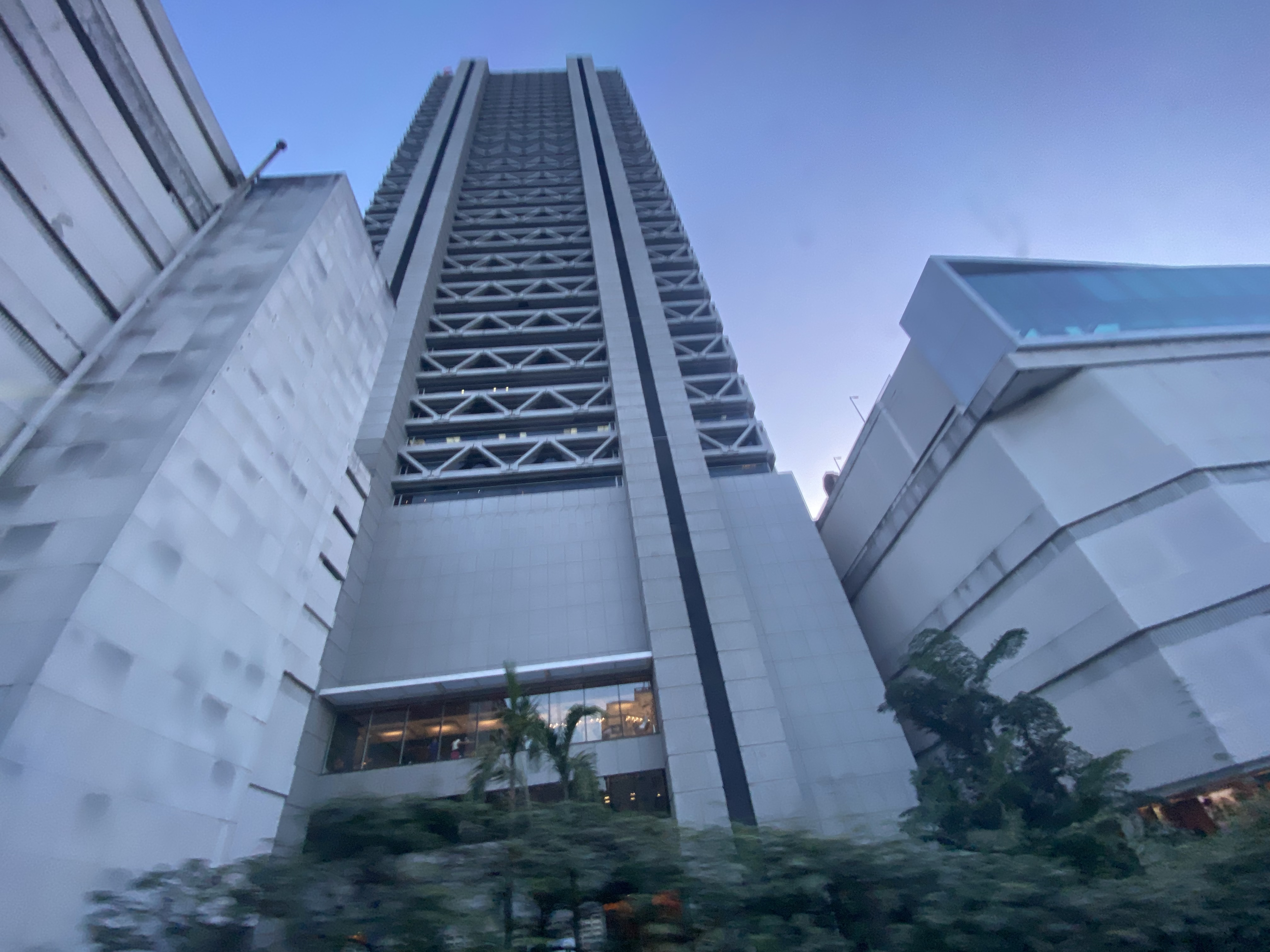
Torre Rio Sul hosting the Consulate-General of Spain in Rio de Janeiro

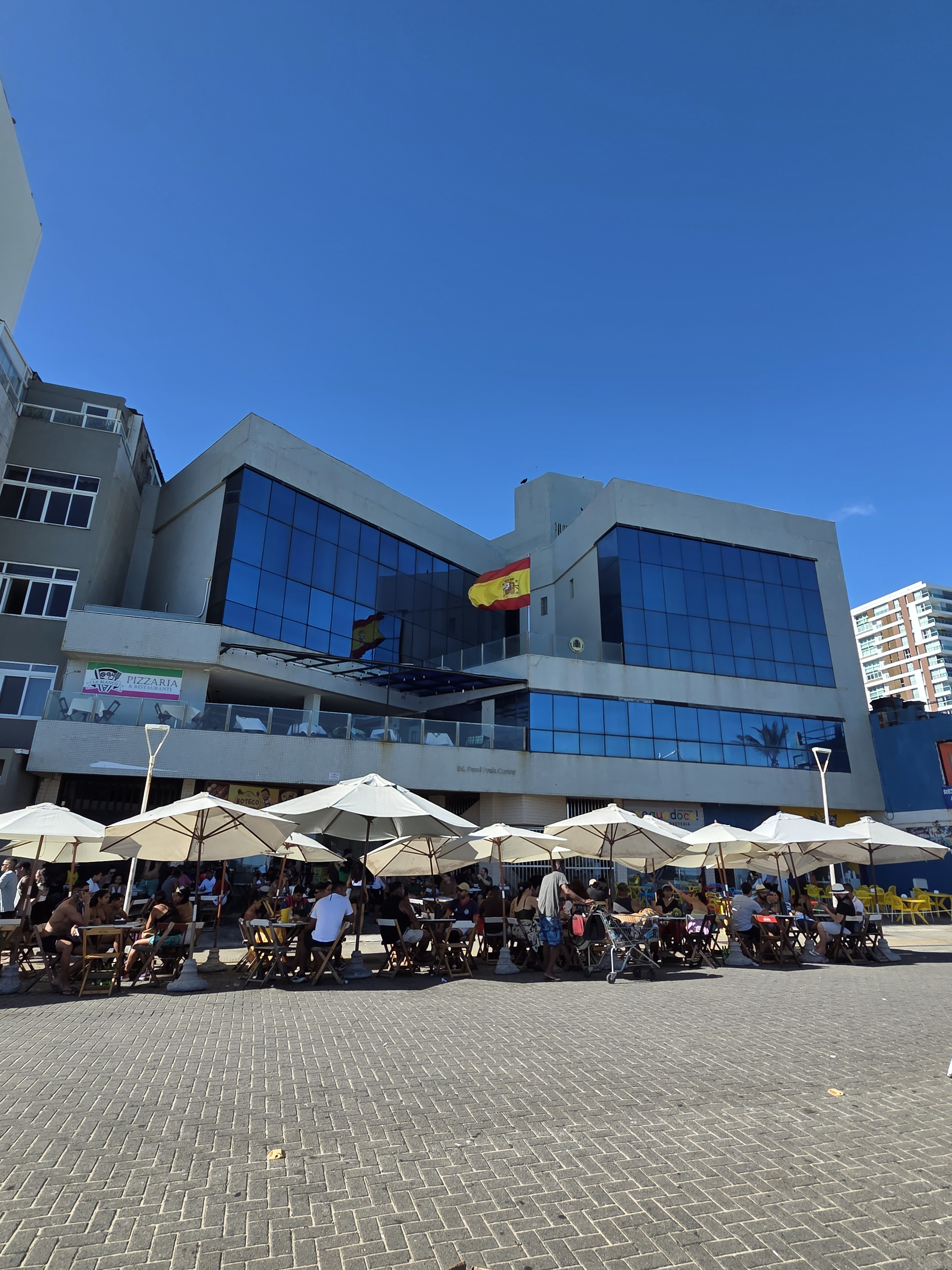
Consulate-General of Spain in Salvador de Bahia

== See also ==
- Colégio Miguel de Cervantes
- Immigration to Spain
- Spanish Brazilians
- Spanish immigration to Brazil
- Brazil–European Union relations
