= Territorial Prelature of São Félix =

Catholic particular church territory

Coordinates: 11.6169°S 50.6689°W

Territorial Prelature of São Félix Praelatura Territorialis Sancti Felicis Prelazia Territorial de São Félix

Location
- Country: Brazil
- Ecclesiastical province: Cuiabá
- Metropolitan: Cuiabá

Statistics
- Area: 150,000 km^{2} (58,000 sq mi)
- Population: Total; Catholics: (as of 2004); 150,000; 129,000 (86%)

Information
- Rite: Latin Rite
- Established: 13 May 1969 (56 years ago)
- Cathedral: Cathedral of the Assumption in São Félix do Araguaia

Current leadership
- Pope: Leo XIV
- Bishop: Lucio Nicoletto
- Metropolitan Archbishop: Mário Antônio da Silva
- Bishops emeritus: Adriano Ciocca Vasino

Website
- Website of the Prelature

The Territorial Prelature of São Félix (do Araguaia) (Latin: Praelatura Territorialis Sancti Felicis) is a Roman Catholic territorial prelature in the Brazilian state of Mato Grosso.

It is a suffragan in the ecclesiastical province of the Metropolitan of Archbishop of Cuiabá. Its cathedral see, Catedral Prelatícia Nossa Senhora da Assunção, is located in the city of São Félix do Araguaia.

On 21 March 2012, Pope Benedict XVI appointed as the Prelate of São Félix Bishop Adriano Ciocca Vasino, who had previously served as the Bishop of the Roman Catholic Diocese of Floresta in Pernambuco.

Bishop Ciocca Vasino demissioned on 13 March 2024 and Pope Francis named as his replacement Lucio Nicoletto. The new bishop was born 18 August 1972 in Este, Italy. He spent his early life, studied in, and was ordained (on 7 June 1998) in the diocese of Padua.

== History ==
On 13 May 1969, the Territorial Prelature of São Félix was established from the Territorial Prelature of Cristalândia, the Territorial Prelature of Registro do Araguaia (later promoted to Diocese of Guiratinga and suppressed) and the Territorial Prelature of Santíssima Conceição do Araguaia (later renamed Marabá and promoted to a suffragan diocese).

== Leadership ==
- Bishop Pere Casaldàliga i Pla, C.M.F. (27 August 1971 – 2 February 2005)
- Bishop Leonardo Ulrich Steiner, O.F.M. (2 February 2005 – 21 September 2011), appointed Auxiliary Bishop of Brasilia
  - Apostolic Administrator: Bishop Eugène Lambert Adrian Rixen of Goiás (21 September 2011 – 21 March 2012)
- Bishop Adriano Ciocca Vasino (21 March 2012 – 13 March 2024)
- Bishop Lucio Nicoletto (13 March 2024 – present)
