= Prinetti Decree =

1902 Italian act on emigration to Brazil

The Prinetti Decree was a ministerial normative act approved by the General Commissariat of Emigration in Italy on March 26, 1902, which prohibited sponsored emigration to Brazil. The ordinance was named after the then Italian foreign affairs minister, Giulio Prinetti, and approved based on a report denouncing the situations experienced by immigrants on coffee plantations, especially in the post-abolition period. Despite banning the sponsored migration of Italians to Brazil, the decree did not restrict spontaneous migration, which means that Italians who wanted to move to Brazil would have to buy their own tickets, without relying on the Brazilian government.

== Previous history ==
=== Promoting immigration to Brazil ===
During the period of great immigration, in the last decades of the 19th century, shipping companies such as Navigazione Generale Italiana, La Veloce, the French Transports Maritimes, which sailed from Marseille, Ligure-Brasiliana, and others, obtained licenses from the Italian government to transport immigrants whose tickets were paid for by the São Paulo government (sponsored immigration). The flow of African slaves was replaced by an influx of Italian workers desperate to get rich quickly, turning shipping companies into promoters of a new model of human traffic. The violence of slavery was replaced by the persuasive lie that Brazil was the land of quick enrichment. For many years, the Italian government did not worry about emigration and looked upon it favorably, since at that time of economic depression, emigration would prevent the internal order from being disturbed by the permanence of that discontented mass of workers, keeping the social balance and the status quo intact. In addition, emigrants contributed to the Italian economy through the funds they sent back home.

=== Reality of life and work in Brazil ===
However, when the settlers arrived at the farms, they found terrible living conditions, isolated from urban centers, with no medical care, no school for their children, small houses and no minimum hygiene conditions. While working in the fields, the foremen watched over the settlers throughout the day and the abuse involved physical violence, even the use of whips. They also controlled their family and social activities. The settlers were unable to obtain legal protection against these abuses by the farmers, who also exploited them economically, imposing penalties for frivolous reasons, confiscating their produce and falsifying weights and measures, as well as withholding their wages. The situation worsened when coffee prices began to fall significantly from 1895 onwards. Once this situation was revealed, a document known as the Rossi Report, compiled by the inspector Adolfo Rossi, was drawn up and sent to the Italian authorities. Based on this report, the Prinetti Decree was issued.

== Consequences of the decree ==
From then on, Brazil was no longer an attractive destination for immigrants from Italy; the state of São Paulo suffered the most from this decision, leading to difficulties in finding workers. As a result, between 1903 and 1919, Italian immigration, which had been hegemonic in São Paulo in previous years, fell to third place, being overtaken by Spanish and Portuguese immigration. Regional origin was also affected: previously, Venetians and Lombards had predominated, but they began to lose importance compared to Italians from the south, especially Calabrians and Campanians.

However, sponsored immigration continued to exist in Brazil until 1927, benefiting other immigrants, such as the Japanese. The situation got worse when, in the early years of the 20th century, there was a major coffee crisis, which affected the local economy, causing not only the flow of migrants to fall, but also the departure of thousands of immigrants from Brazil.

== See also ==
- Brazil-Italy relations
- Immigration to Brazil
- Italian Brazilians
- European immigration to Brazil
- Adolfo Gordo Law
