= Czesław Stanula =

Polish priest (1940–2020)

Czesław Stanula C.Ss.R.
- Bishop of Itabuna
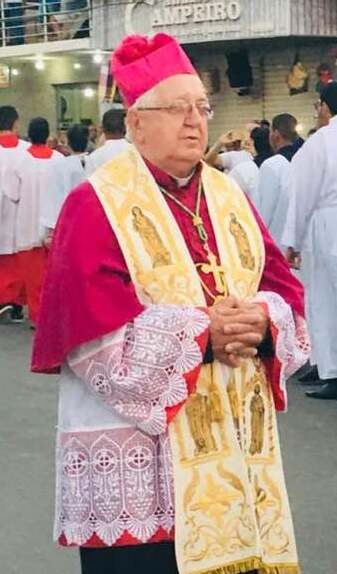
- Church: Catholic Church
- Diocese: Diocese of Itabuna
- In office: 27 August 1997 – 1 February 2017
- Predecessor: Paulo Lopes de Faria
- Successor: Carlos Alberto dos Santos
- Previous post: Bishop of Floresta (1989-1997)

Orders
- Ordination: 19 July 1964 by Jerzy Ablewicz
- Consecration: 5 November 1989 by Lucas Moreira Neves

Personal details
- Born: 27 March 1940 Szerzyny, Kraków District, General Government, Nazi Germany
- Died: 14 May 2020 (aged 80) Salvador, Bahia, Brazil

Czesław Stanula C.Ss.R. (27 March 1940 – 14 May 2020) was a Polish-Brazilian Roman Catholic bishop.

Stanula was born in Poland and was ordained to the priesthood in 1964. He served as bishop of the Roman Catholic Diocese of Floresta, Brazil from 1989 to 1997 and as bishop of the Roman Catholic Diocese of Itabuna, Brazil, from 1997 to 2017.
