= Lucio Nicoletto =

Italian bishop in the Catholic Church

Most Reverend Lucio Nicoletto
- Prelate of São Félix do Araguaia
- Church: Roman Catholic Church
- See: Territorial Prelature of São Félix
- Predecessor: Adriano Ciocca Vasino
- Previous post: Vicar general of diocese of Roraima

Orders
- Ordination: June 7, 1998

Personal details
- Born: August 18, 1972 (age 53) Este, Italy
- Coat of arms

Styles of Lucio Nicoletto
- Reference style: The Most Reverend
- Spoken style: Your Excellency
- Religious style: Monsignor

Lucio Nicoletto (born 18 August 1972) is an Italian priest of the Catholic Church, and current vicar general of Roman Catholic Diocese of Roraima. On 13 March 2024, he was elected bishop prelate of São Félix, Brazil.

== Biography ==
Nicoletto was born 18 August 1972 in Este to Dino and Paola Paluan and has a younger sister and brother. On 7 June 1998, at the age of 25, he completed studies at the Major Seminary of Padua and was ordained a priest for the Diocese of Padua.

In January 2019, Nicoletto served as vicar general for the Diocese of Roraima. From the resignation of Bishop Mário Antônio da Silva in February 2022 until the appointment of Bishop Evaristo Pascoal Spengler January 2023, Nicoletto served as the diocesan administrator for the Diocese of Roraima. Since 2023, he has returned to the role of vicar general.

On 13 March 2024, Pope Francis nominated Nicoletto bishop prelate of São Felix, Brazil. Bishop Claudio Cipolla of Padua noted that the appointment is an honor both for Nicoletto and for his home diocese.

On 1 June, 2024, Nicoletto was consecrated a bishop in the Padua Cathedral. He was consecrated by Archbishop Mário Antônio da Silva, assisted by Claudio Cipolla, bishop of Padua, and Adriano Ciocca Vasino, his predecessor in São Félix. On 30 June, he officially began his duties as bishop.
