= St. Anthony Cathedral, Diamantina =

St. Anthony Cathedral
- Catedral Metropolitana Santo Antônio da Sé
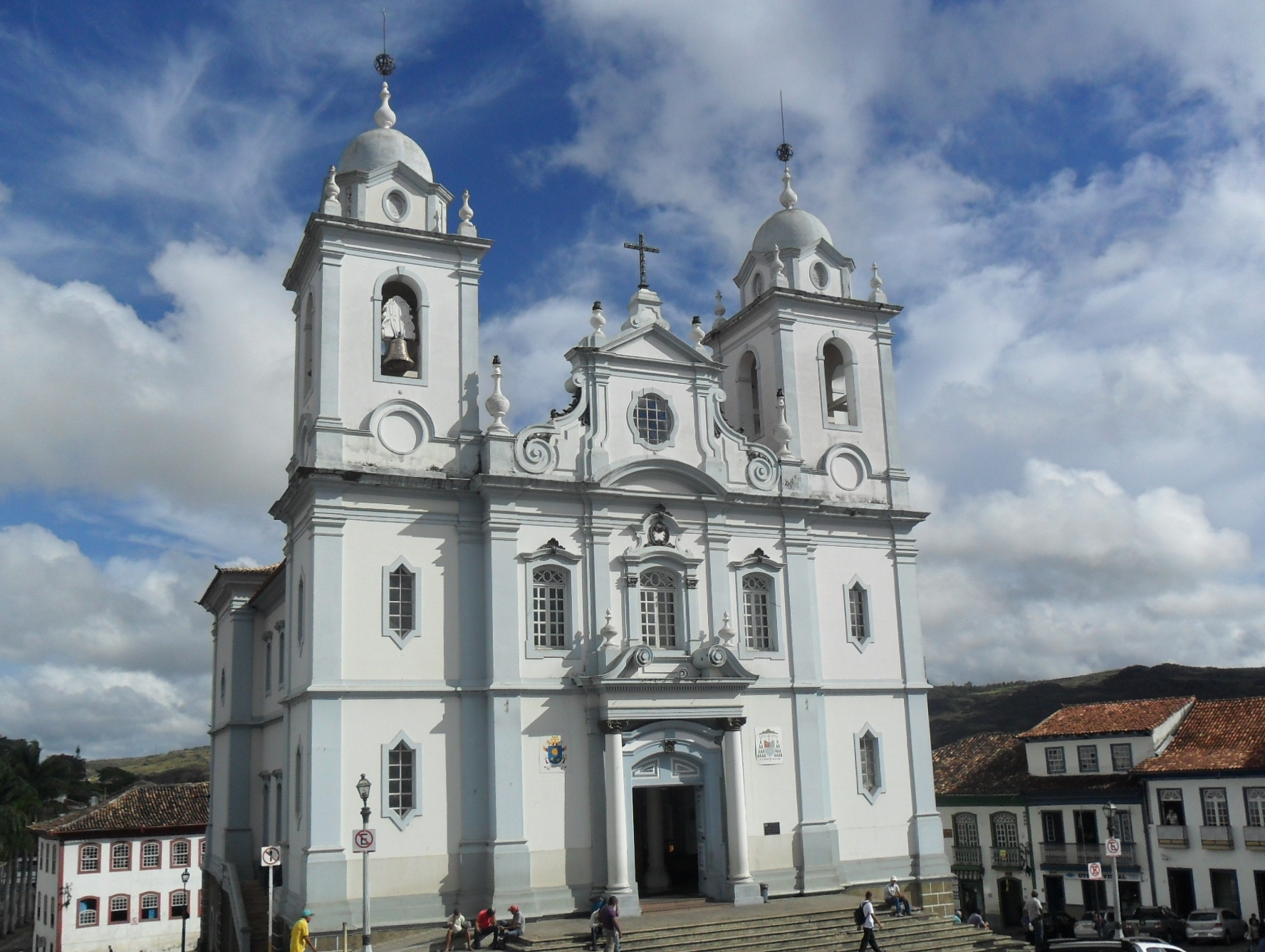
- St. Anthony Cathedral
- 18°14′41″S 43°35′51″W
- Location: Diamantina
- Country: Brazil
- Denomination: Roman Catholic Church

Administration
- Archdiocese: Diamantina

The St. Anthony Cathedral (Portuguese: Catedral Metropolitana Santo Antônio da Sé), also Diamantina Cathedral, is a Catholic church located in the city of Diamantina, in the state of Minas Gerais, Brazil. It is the headquarters of the Archdiocese of Diamantina and is dedicated to Saint Anthony.

In the place where the cathedral is located was the former Main Church of St. Anthony, built in the eighteenth century. With the creation of the Diocese of Diamantina in 1854, the seat was elevated to the condition of cathedral. The temple has undergone some renovations but was finally demolished to rebuild it in 1930. Instead, the current cathedral was built, whose works were completed in 1940. The design of the current temple is attributed to Joseph Wasth Rodrigues.

== See also ==
- Roman Catholicism in Brazil
- St. Anthony Cathedral (disambiguation)
