= Eunápolis =

Municipality of Bahia, Brazil

- Municipality
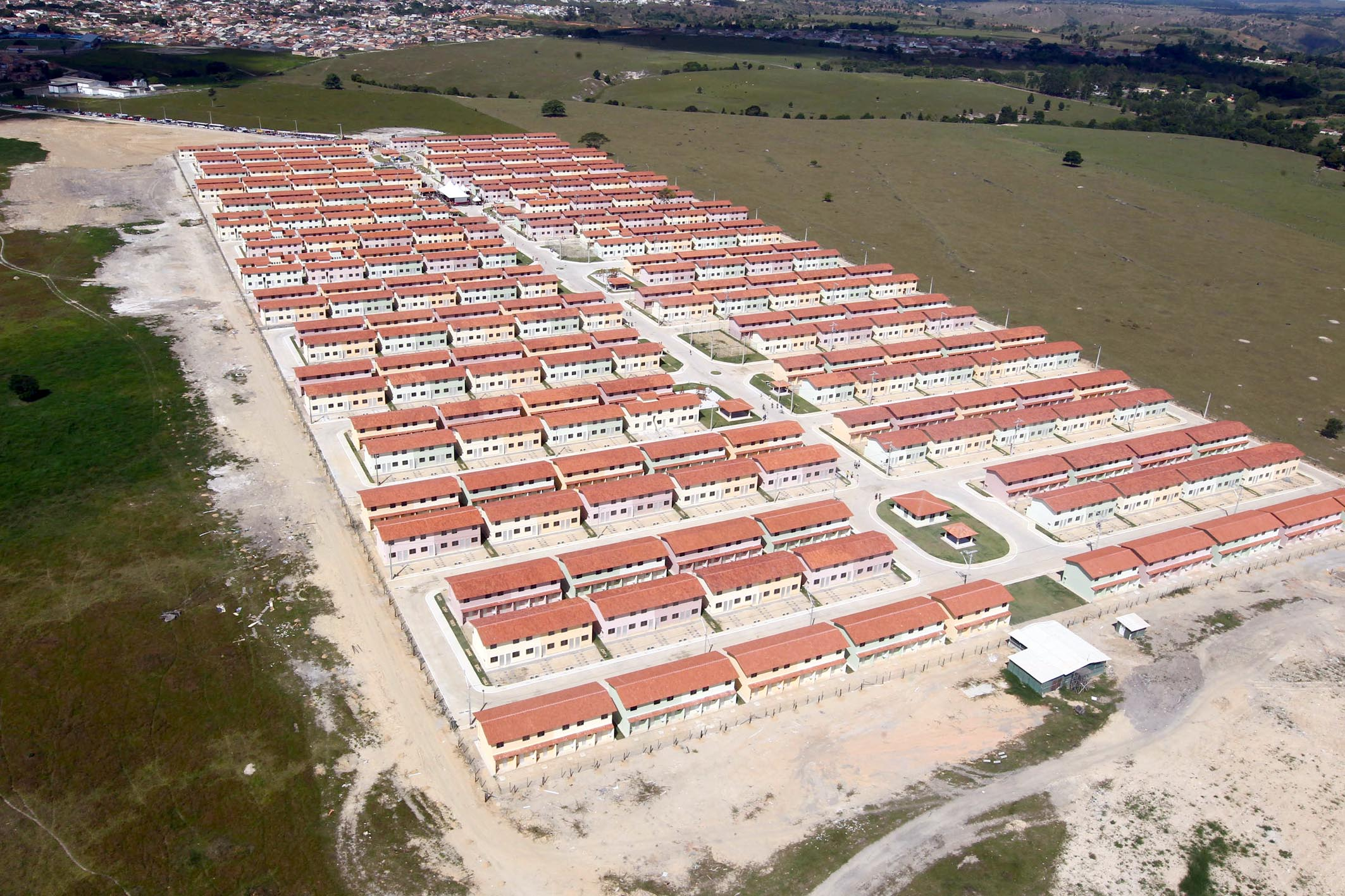
- Social housing in Eunápolis, Brazil

- Flag Coat of arms
- Motto(s): Freedom, honesty, work
- Location of Eunápolis

- Location of Eunápolis
- Coordinates: 16°22′40″S 39°34′48″W
- Country: Brazil
- Region: Northeast
- State: Bahia

Area
  - Total: 1,179 km^{2} (455 sq mi)

Population (2022 Census)
  - Total: 113,709
  - Estimate (2025): 121,067
  - Density: 96.45/km^{2} (249.8/sq mi)
- Time zone: UTC−3 (BRT)

Eunápolis is a municipality in Bahia with 113,709 people (2022 Census). The town was founded in 1988. In 1996, the city was made the seat of the Roman Catholic Diocese of Eunápolis.
