= Diocese of Eunápolis =

Catholic ecclesiastical territory

Coordinates: 16.3768°S 39.5864°W

Diocese of Eunápolis Dioecesis Eunapolitana

Catholic
- Catedral Nossa Senhora Auxiliadora

Location
- Country: Brazil
- Ecclesiastical province: São Salvador da Bahia

Statistics
- Area: 12,729 km^{2} (4,915 sq mi)
- Population: Total; Catholics: (as of 2004); 614,485; 534,485 (87.0%)

Information
- Rite: Latin Rite
- Established: June 12, 1996; 30 years ago
- Cathedral: Catedral Nossa Senhora Auxiliadora

Current leadership
- Pope: Leo XIV
- Bishop: José Edson Santana de Oliveira
- Metropolitan Archbishop: Murilo Sebastião Ramos Krieger

Website
- diocesedeeunapolis.sgcp.com.br

The Roman Catholic Diocese of Eunápolis (Latin: Dioecesis Eunapolitana) is a diocese located in the city of Eunápolis in the ecclesiastical province of São Salvador da Bahia in Brazil.

== History ==
- 12 June 1996: Established as Diocese of Eunápolis from the Diocese of Itabuna and Diocese of Teixeira de Freitas–Caravelas

== Leadership ==
- Bishops of Eunápolis (Roman rite)
  - Bishop José Edson Santana de Oliveira (12 June 1996 – present)
