= Adriano Ciocca Vasino =

Italian bishop in the Catholic Church

Most Reverend Adriano Ciocca Vasino
- Prelate of São Félix do Araguaia
- Church: Roman Catholic Church
- See: Territorial Prelature of São Félix
- Predecessor: Leonardo Ulrich Steiner
- Successor: Lucio Nicoletto

Orders
- Ordination: 8 September 1974
- Consecration: 2 May 1999 by Czeslaw Stanula

Personal details
- Born: 8 July 1949 (age 76) Borgosesia, Italy

Adriano Ciocca Vasino (born 8 July 1949) is an Italian bishop in the Catholic Church. On 21 March 2012, he became Prelate of São Félix do Araguaia, Brazil.

== Biography ==
Adriano Ciocca Vasino was born on 8 July 1949, in Borgosesia, in the Roman Catholic Diocese of Novara based in Novara, Italy.

He studied Philosophy at the Philosophical and Theological Seminary San Gaudenzio in Novara, and Theology at the Theological Seminary San Zeno, in Verona, Italy. Ordained as a priest on 8 September 1974, he was then incardinated in the Diocese of Novara.

=== Career ===
After some years of pastoral practice in his Diocese, he flew as a Fidei donum priest in Brazil, and he was appointed to be the Bishop of Floresta by Pope John Paul II on 3 March 1999, and was consecrated on 2 May 1999.

Until 2001, he was the referent for the CNBB in the Basic ecclesial communities. On 21 March 2012, and he entered on 13 May 2012.
