= Colégio Miguel de Cervantes =

Spanish international school in Brazil

Information
- Established: 1978; 48 years ago
- Website: www.cmc.com.br

Colégio Miguel de Cervantes (CMC) is a Spanish international school, in Morumbi, São Paulo, Brazil. Founded in 1978, it serves levels infant education through ensino médio (senior high school/sixth form college). The Asociación Colegio Español de São Paulo (ACESP) operates the centre.

== See also ==
- Brazil–Spain relations
- Spanish immigration to Brazil
- Brazilians of Spanish descent
