= Diocese of Itabuna =

Catholic ecclesiastical territory

Diocese of Itabuna Dioecesis Itabunensis

Catholic
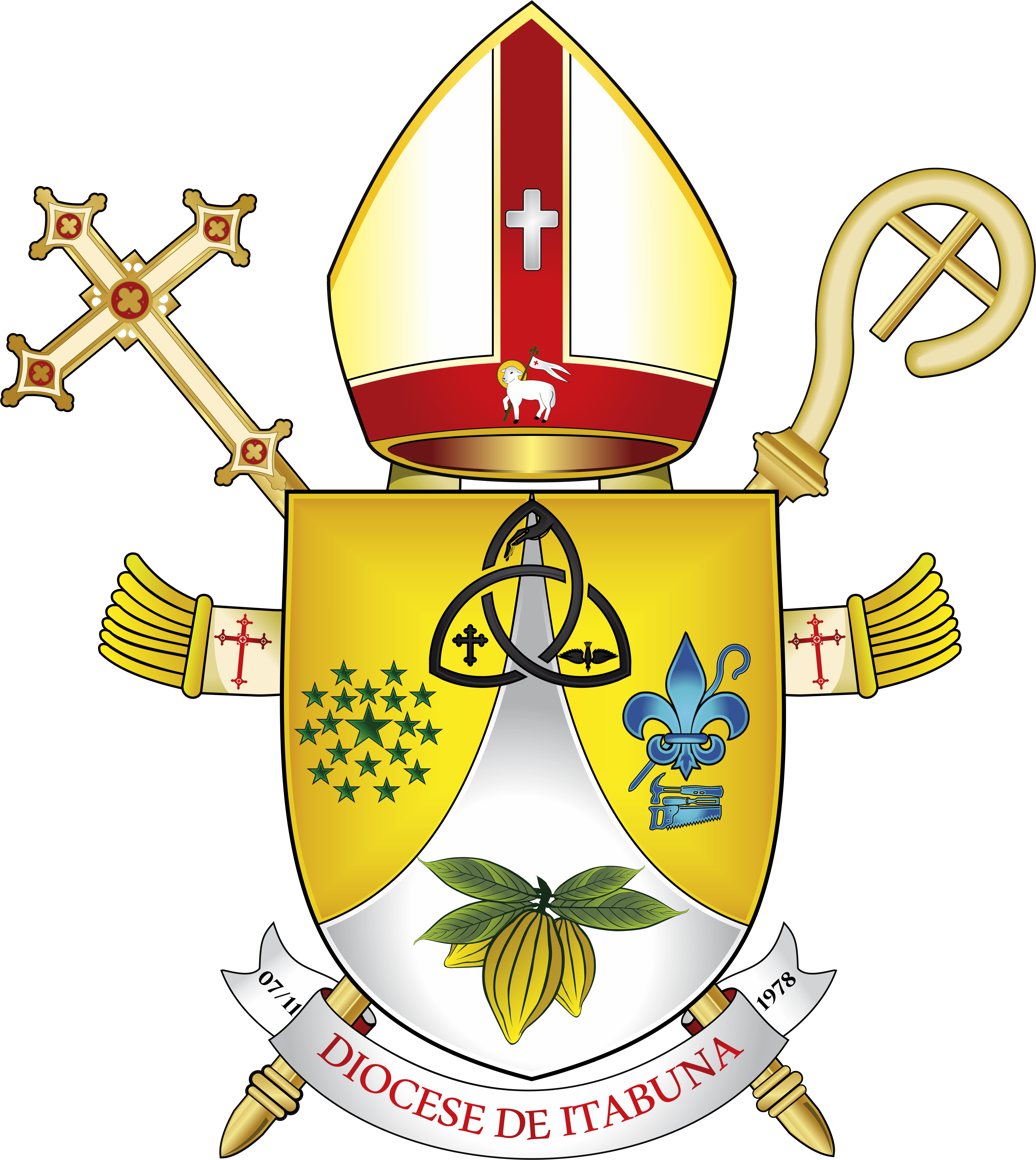
- Coat of arms

Location
- Country: Brazil
- Ecclesiastical province: São Salvador da Bahia

Statistics
- Area: 10,692 km^{2} (4,128 sq mi)
- Population: Total; Catholics: (as of 2023); 456,216; 337,600 (74.0%)
- Parishes: 33

Information
- Denomination: Catholic Church
- Sui iuris church: Latin Church
- Rite: Roman Rite
- Established: 7 November 1978; 47 years ago
- Cathedral: Catedral São José
- Secular priests: 40 (32 Diocesan, 8 Religious Orders)

Current leadership
- Pope: Leo XIV
- Bishop: Jailton de Oliveira Lino, P.S.D.P.
- Metropolitan Archbishop: Sérgio da Rocha
- Bishops emeritus: Carlos Alberto dos Santos

The Roman Catholic Diocese of Itabuna (Latin: Dioecesis Itabunensis) is a Latin suffragan diocese in the ecclesiastical province of São Salvador da Bahia in Bahia state, eastern Brazil.

Its cathedral episcopal see is Catedral São José, dedicated to Saint Joseph, in the city of Itabuna.

== Statistics ==
As of 2022, it pastorally served 337,600 Catholics (74.0% of 456,216 total) on 10,692km² in 33 parishes with 40 priests (32 diocesan, 8 religious), 8 deacons, 27 lay religious (8 brothers, 19 sisters) and 12 seminarians.

== History ==
- Established on 7 November 1978 as Diocese of Itabuna, on territory split off from the Diocese of Ilhéus.
- Lost territory on 12 June 1996 to establish the Diocese of Eunápolis.

== Episcopal ordinaries ==
(all Roman rite)

Suffragan Bishops of Itabuna

- Homero Leite Meira (7 November 1978 – 24 September 1980), appointed Bishop of Irecê, Bahia
- Eliseu Maria Gomes de Oliveira, O. Carm. (24 September 1980 – 20 July 1983), resigned
- Paulo Lopes de Faria (16 December 1983 – 2 August 1995), appointed Coadjutor Archbishop of Diamantina, Minas Gerais
- Czesław Stanula, C.Ss.R. (27 August 1997 – 1 February 2017), retired
- Carlos Alberto dos Santos (1 February 2017 – 30 October 2024), resigned
  - Apostolic Administrator Jailton de Oliveira Lino, P.S.D.P (30 October 2024 – 25 February 2025 see below)
- Jailton de Oliveira Lino, P.S.D.P. (see above 25 February 2025 – Present)

== Sources and external links ==
Media related to Roman Catholic Diocese of Itabuna at Wikimedia Commons

- GCatholic.org, with oggle map and – satellite photo – data for all sections
- Catholic Hierarchy
