= Archdiocese of Diamantina =

Latin Catholic jurisdiction in Brazil

Coordinates: 18.2447°S 43.5973°W

Archdiocese of Diamantina Archidioecesis Adamantina Arquidiocese de Diamantina
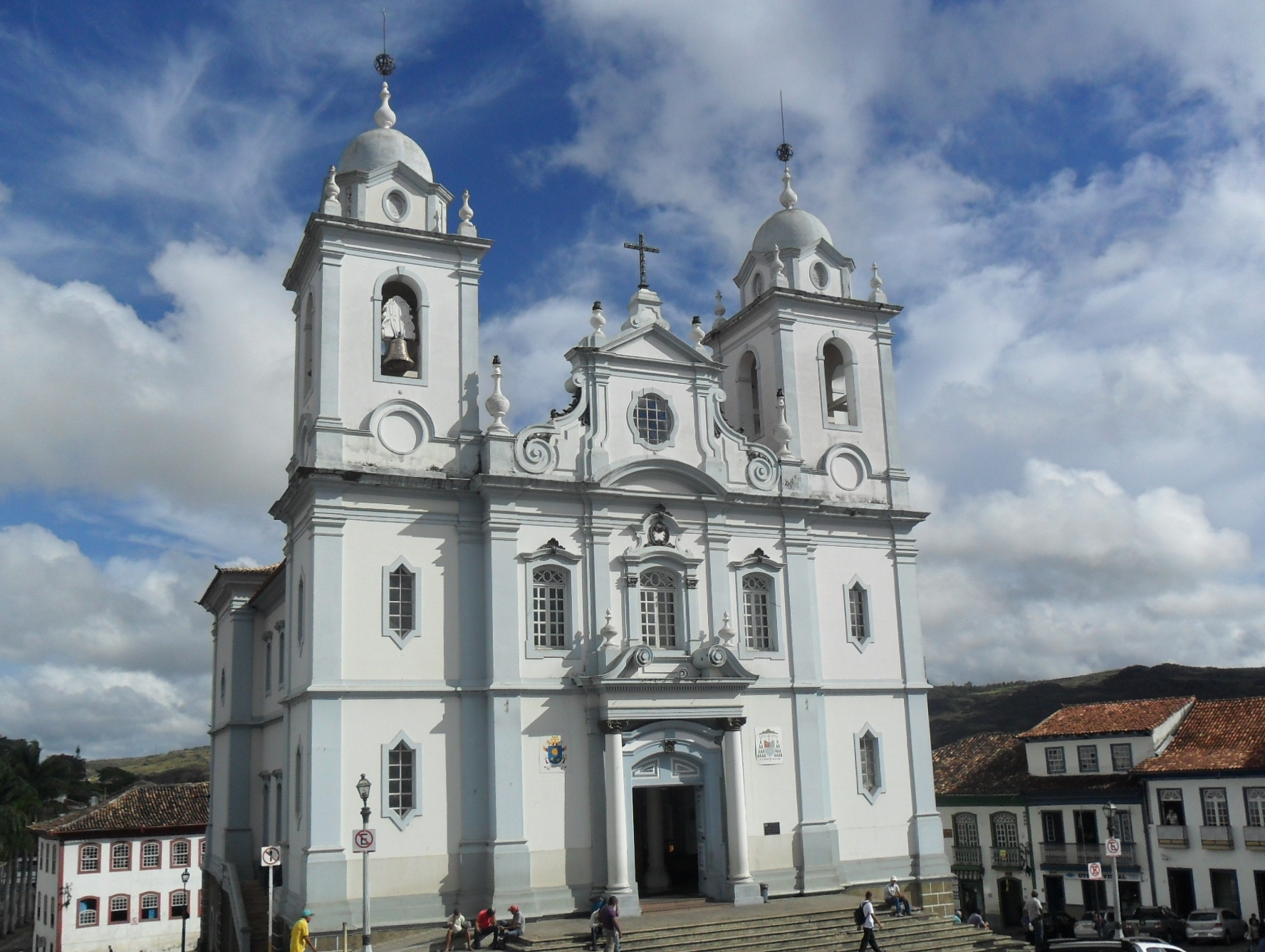
- St. Anthony's Cathedral, Diamantina

- Coat of arms

Location
- Country: Brazil
- Ecclesiastical province: Diamantina

Statistics
- Area: 45,171 km^{2} (17,441 sq mi)
- Population: Total; Catholics: (as of 2013); 524,000; 459,000 (87.6%)

Information
- Denomination: Catholic Church
- Sui iuris church: Latin Church
- Rite: Roman Rite
- Established: 6 June 1854 (171 years ago)
- Cathedral: Cathedral of Saint Anthony in Diamantina

Current leadership
- Pope: Leo XIV
- Metropolitan Archbishop: Darci José Nicioli
- Bishops emeritus: Paulo Lopes de Faria

Website
- www.arquidiamantina.org.br

The Archdiocese of Diamantina (Latin: Archidioecesis Adamantina) is an archdiocese located in the city of Diamantina, Minas Gerais in Brazil.

== History ==
- June 6, 1854: Established as Diocese of Diamantina from the Diocese of Mariana
- June 28, 1917: Promoted as Metropolitan Archdiocese of Diamantina

== Special churches ==
- Minor Basilicas:
  - Basílica Sagrado Coração de Jesus, Diamantina
  - Basílica São Geraldo Majela, Curvelo

== Bishops ==
=== Ordinaries, in reverse chronological order ===
- Archbishops of Diamantina (Roman rite)
  - Archbishop Darci José Nicioli (2016.03.09 - Present)
  - Archbishop João Bosco Oliver de Faria (2007.05.30 – 2016.03.09)
  - Archbishop Paulo Lopes de Faria (1997.05.14 – 2007.05.30)
  - Archbishop Geraldo Majela Reis (1981.02.03 – 1997.05.14)
  - Archbishop Geraldo de Proença Sigaud, S.V.D. (1960.12.20 – 1980.09.10)
  - Archbishop José Newton de Almeida Baptista (1954.01.05 – 1960.03.12)
  - Archbishop Serafim Gomes Jardim da Silva (1934.05.26 – 1953.10.28)
  - Archbishop Joaquim Silvério de Souza (1917.06.28 – 1933.08.30)
- Bishops of Diamantina (Roman Rite)
  - Archbishop (personal title) Joaquim Silvério de Souza (1910.01.25 – 1917.06.28)
  - Bishop Joaquim Silvério de Souza (later Archbishop) (1905.05.05 – 1909.01.29)
  - Bishop João Antônio dos Santos (1863.09.28 – 1905.05.17)

=== Coadjutor bishops ===
- Joaquim Silvério de Souza (1901-1905)
- Paulo Lopes de Faria (1995-1997)

=== Auxiliary bishops ===
- Antônio José dos Santos, C.M. (1918-1929), appointed Bishop of Assis, São Paulo
- Carlos Carmelo de Vasconcellos Motta (1932-1935), appointed Archbishop of São Luís do Maranhão; future Cardinal
- João de Souza Lima, O. Cist. (1949-1955), appointed Bishop of Nazaré, Pernambuco

=== Other priests of this diocese who became bishops ===
- Cyrillo de Paula Freitas, appointed Coadjutor Bishop of Cuiabá in 1905
- João Antônio Pimenta, appointed Coadjutor Bishop of São Pedro do Rio Grande do Sul in 1906
- Lúcio Antunes de Souza, appointed Bishop of Botucatu in 1908
- Nunes de Ávila e Silva, appointed Bishop of Taubaté, São Paulo in 1909
- João de Almeida Ferrão (Terra), appointed Bishop of Campanha, Minas Gerais in 1909
- Manuel Nunes Coelho, appointed Bishop of Aterrado in 1920
- José André Coimbra, appointed Bishop of Barra do Piraí in 1938
- Serafim Fernandes de Araújo, appointed Auxiliary Bishop of Belo Horizonte, Minas Gerais in 1959; future Cardinal
- Leonardo de Miranda Pereira, appointed Bishop of Paracatu, Minas Gerais in 1986
- José Aristeu Vieira, appointed Bishop of Luz, Minas Gerais in 2015
- Lindomar Rocha Mota, appointed Bishop of São Luís de Montes Belos, Goias in 2020

== Suffragan dioceses ==
- Diocese of Almenara
- Diocese of Araçuaí
- Diocese of Guanhães
- Diocese of Teófilo Otoni

== Sources ==
- GCatholic.org
- Catholic Hierarchy
- Archdiocese website (Portuguese)
