= Paulo Lopes de Faria =

- Archbishop of Diamantina
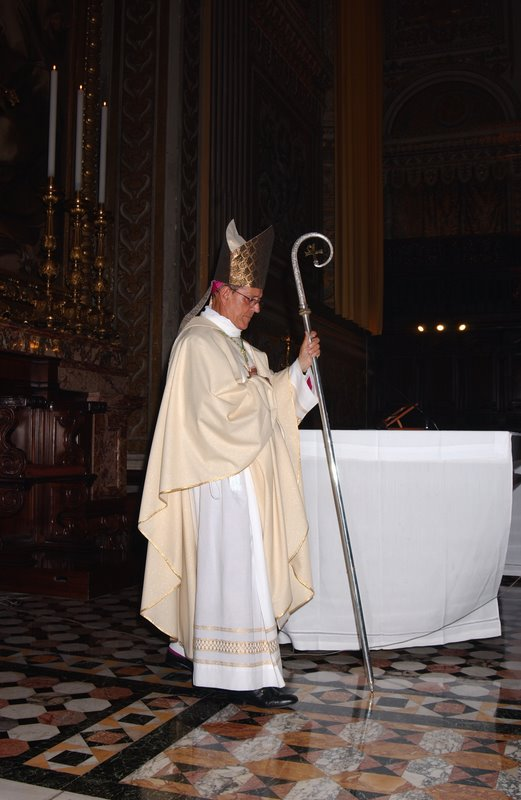
- Bishop Paulo Lopes de Faria in 2009
- Church: Catholic Church
- Archdiocese: Archdiocese of Diamantina
- In office: 14 May 1997 – 30 May 2007
- Predecessor: Geraldo Majela Reis
- Successor: João Bosco Oliver de Faria
- Previous posts: Coadjutor Bishop of Diamantina (1995-1997); Bishop of Itabuna (1983-1995); Titular Bishop of Thelepte (1980-1983); Auxiliary Bishop of Niterói (1980-1983)

Orders
- Ordination: 8 December 1957
- Consecration: 27 December 1980 by João Resende Costa

Personal details
- Born: 24 February 1931 Igaratinga, Minas Gerais, United States of Brazil
- Died: 16 July 2009 (aged 78) Belo Horizonte, Minas Gerais, Brazil

Paulo Lopes de Faria (February 24, 1931 Igaratinga - July 16, 2009) was the Brazilian Archbishop of the Roman Catholic Archdiocese of Diamantina from May 14, 1997, until his retirement on May 30, 2007. He was succeeded by Archbishop João Bosco Oliver de Faria, but remained Archbishop Emeritus of the diocese until his death in 2009.

Archbishop Paulo Lopes de Faria died on July 16, 2009, in Belo Horizonte at the age of 78.

== References and external links ==
- Catholic Hierarchy: Archbishop Paulo Lopes de Faria†
- Cancao Nova Noticias: Archbishop Emeritus of Diamantina dies (Portuguese)

Specific
