= Diocese of Floresta =

Catholic ecclesiastical territory

Coordinates: 8.6033°S 38.5705°W

Diocese of Floresta Dioecesis Florestensis

Catholic

Location
- Country: Brazil
- Ecclesiastical province: Olinda e Recife

Statistics
- Area: 18,210 km^{2} (7,030 sq mi)
- Population: Total; Catholics: (as of 2002); 253,060; 248,690 (98.3%)

Information
- Rite: Latin Rite
- Established: 15 February 1964 (62 years ago)
- Cathedral: Catedral Bom Jesus dos Aflitos

Current leadership
- Pope: Leo XIV
- Bishop: Gabriel Marchesi
- Metropolitan Archbishop: Fernando Antônio Saburido, O.S.B.

Website
- diocesedefloresta.wordpress.com

The Roman Catholic Diocese of Floresta (Latin: Dioecesis Florestensis) is a diocese located in the city of Floresta in the ecclesiastical province of Olinda e Recife in Brazil.

== History ==
- February 15, 1964: Established as Diocese of Floresta from the Diocese of Pesqueira and Diocese of Petrópolis

== Leadership ==
- Bishops of Floresta
  - Bishop Francisco Xavier Nierhoff, M.S.F. (1964.08.04 - 1988.12.12)
  - Bishop Czesław Stanula, C.Ss.R. (1989.06.17 – 1997.08.27), appointed Bishop of Itabuna, Bahia
  - Bishop Adriano Ciocca Vasino (1999.03.03 – 2012.03.21), appointed Prelate of São Félix, Mato Grosso
  - Bishop Gabriel Marchesi (2013.02.21 -
