= Spanish immigration to Brazil =

Spanish emigration peaked in the late 19th and early 20th centuries, and it was concentrated to Argentina, Uruguay and Cuba. Between 1882 and 1930, 3,297,312 Spaniards emigrated, of whom 1,594,622 went to Argentina and 1,118,960 went to Cuba. Brazil only started to be an important destination for immigrants from Spain in the 1880s, but the country received the third largest number of Spanish emigrants, behind only the two aforementioned countries. Spaniards also made up the third largest national group to immigrate to Brazil, after the Italians and Portuguese.

Between 1840 and 1849, only 10 Spaniards immigrated to Brazil; 180 did so between 1850 and 1859; 633 between 1860 and 1869; and 3,940 between 1870 and 1879. The number of arrivals increased significantly between 1880 and 1889, when 29,166 Spaniards arrived. Spanish immigration to Brazil was a direct result of the efforts of the Brazilian government to attract European workers to the country, in order to “whiten” the Brazilian population and to replace the African manpower. The Brazilian government spent large amounts of money paying passages of European immigrants by ship (subsidized immigration). A huge propaganda was conducted by the Brazilian government in Spain, with agents that worked for it (ganchos) who went to the country in order to persuade Spaniards to immigrate to Brazil. The Brazilian government offered the free travel by ship to Brazil, and that was decisive in attracting immigrants. Brazil was a country far less attractive than Argentina and Cuba, countries with which the Spaniards maintained cultural relations. Moreover, the working conditions in Brazil were much worse. Thus, the Spaniards who emigrated to Brazil were those who could not afford to pay a passage by ship to Cuba and Argentina, the poorest ones, and took advantage of the offer of free travel to Brazil. For the wretched Spanish peasants, the free passage by ship offered by the Brazilian government seemed a great opportunity to leave poverty.

The Spanish community was present in all São Paulo. According to a 1933 research, the largest concentration of Spaniards was found in the region of Catanduva, Rio Preto, Araraquara, Santa Adélia etc., with 108,000 Spaniards. Next was the central part of the state in cities such as Campinas, Sorocaba, Itu and Jundiaí, with 28,000. Northwest São Paulo, in cities such as Bauru, Araçatuba and Marília had 45,000 Spaniards. This way, about 75% of the Spanish community in São Paulo was concentrated in the region of Araraquara and in the Northwest and in those areas the towns with most Spaniards were Tanabi, Mirassol, Nova Granada (named after the Spanish city of Granada), São José do Rio Preto and Olímpia. The city of São Paulo had 50,000 Spaniards. The 1913 census in Santos found a population of 8,343 Spaniards out of a population of 39,802 people. In 1931 there were 11,982 Spaniards in that city, out of a population of 125,941 people (or 9.51% of the total population).

Reports that Spanish immigrants were living in appalling conditions in Brazil made Spain, in 1909, sent to Brazil the Inspector Gamboa Navarro in order to assess the situation of the Spaniards in the country. Navarro made a report, which showed that employment contracts were "illusory", because they were not respected. In coffee plantations, he wrote that the immigrants slept on the floor and in tiny houses and also reported that the abuses in labour relations were frequent. He concluded that 98% of the Spaniards in Brazil would return to Spain if they could. Three weeks after the publication of that report, Spanish newspaper Gaceta de Madrid proposed a ban on Spanish emigration to Brazil. The newspapers remembered that Italy and Germany had already passed laws on the subject and that Portugal was trying to conduct its immigrants to other countries rather than Brazil. Finally, on August 26, 1910, Spain issued a royal decree prohibiting the free emigration to Brazil. The decree did not have any effect and, the Spanish immigration to Brazil peaked after it was issued.

Other reports suggest that there was a thriving Spanish community in Brazil, particularly those who were able to leave the coffee plantations and to buy their own lands.

It is estimated that since Brazil's independence (1822) some 750,000 Spaniards have entered Brazil. This figure represents between 12.5% and 14% of all foreigners entering Brazil since its independence and puts the Spaniards in the third place among immigrants in Brazil, behind the Portuguese and Italians. Immigrants of Spanish origin were among those who had a higher rate of permanent residence in Brazil, overtaken by the Japanese but above nationalities such as Portuguese, Italian or German. This may be due to the large number of families traveling with passage paid by the Brazilian government that left their native Spain to work on coffee plantations of the state of São Paulo. Most Spaniards entered Brazil between 1880 and 1930, with the peak period between 1905 and 1919, when they overcome the entry of Italians.

== Origins and destinations ==
In all Brazilian states, the immigrants from Galicia predominated, and those were predominantly males, who emigrated alone, settled in urban centers and paid for their passage by ship. The only exception was the state of São Paulo, destination for the vast majority of the Spaniards, around 75% of the total. In São Paulo, 60% were from Andalusia, and only 20% from Galicia. Those had their passage by ship paid by the Brazilian government, emigrated in families and were taken to the coffee farms to replace the African slave manpower. In 1910 the penury faced by those emigrants in the coffee farms made the Spanish government to ban the free emigration by ship to Brazil. This act had little importance, because the emigrants, who were mostly from Eastern Andalusia, used to emigrate to Brazil though the Port of Gibraltar, between North Africa and Spain. The immigrants, attracted by the ganchos, used to leave their lands in Andalusia and travel to Gibraltar in poor conditions. Once in Gibraltar they could take several days to take a ship to Brazil. Once in São Paulo, they were employed in coffee farms under terrible working conditions.

The main area of destination for Spaniards was the state of São Paulo, although the percentages of attraction to this state vary between 66% and 78% in different sources. The second largest contingent was deployed in Rio de Janeiro, while other states such as Minas Gerais, Rio Grande do Sul, Paraná, Mato Grosso, Pará and Bahia received smaller groups. Most Spaniards in Brazil came from the Galicia and Andalusia regions of Spain. Galician smallholders settled mainly in urban areas of Brazil. Starting in the early 20th century, most Spanish immigrants were Andalusian peasants who worked in the coffee plantations, mainly in rural areas of São Paulo State.

The profile of the Spanish immigrants during the period 1908–26 shows that only 17.3% immigrated without the family, 81.4% were farmers, only 2.2% were artisans or skilled workers and 16.3% were in category of "others". These data reflect that the Spanish immigration was not very diversified and qualified and had a low mobility since it was subsidized by the Brazilian Government, then the immigrants were not free to decide where to work. In this way, the vast majority of those who came to São Paulo were directly taken to the coffee farms without having the opportunity to settle rural communities as land owners, or work in urban jobs.

One factor that contributed to the more rapid process of assimilation and acculturation of the community of Spanish origin in Brazil was, in addition to linguistic and cultural proximity (accentuated by the high presence of Galicians), the ease with which both Spanish men and women married Brazilians: 64.7% of Spanish men married Brazilian women and 47.2% of Spanish women married Brazilian men.

== Numbers of immigrants ==
Spanish immigration to Brazil Source: (IBGE)
Period
1884–1893	1894–1903	1904–1913	1914–1923	1924–1933	1945–1949	1950–1954	1955–1959
113,116	102,142	224,672	94,779	52,405	40,092	53,357	38,819

== Brazilians of Spanish descent ==
- Clóvis Bornay
- Drauzio Varella
- Ivete Sangalo
- Mário Covas
- Nélida Piñon
- Oscarito
- Pedro Casaldáliga
- Raul Cortez

== Education ==
There is one Spanish international school in Brazil, Colégio Miguel de Cervantes in São Paulo.

== See also ==
- Immigration to Brazil
- European immigration to Brazil
- White Latin American
