= Clóvis Bornay =

Brazilian museologist

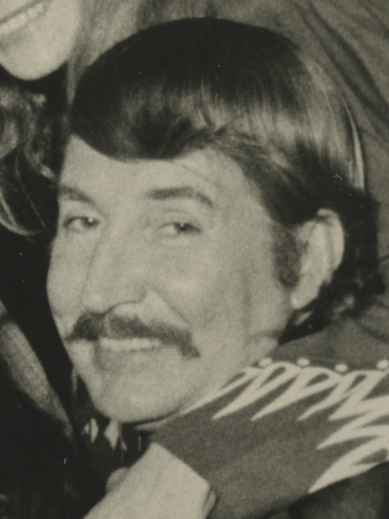
- Born: January 10, 1916; Nova Friburgo (RJ - Brazil)
- Died: October 9, 2005 (aged 89); Rio de Janeiro (RJ - Brazil)
- Occupation(s): Museologist and carnival designer
- Years active: 1930s–2000s
- Known for: Carnival

Clóvis Bornay (January 10, 1916 – October 9, 2005) was a Brazilian museologist, actor, and maker of Carnival costumes for more than 40 years, which made him famous throughout the nation, and he continues to be honored and the subject at Carnival parades today. He also composed some of the Carnival songs in the 1960s and 1970s and was the costume designer for the Salgueiro parade in 1966; Unidos de Lucas from 1967 to 1969; GRES Portela in 1969 and 1970, where he won at this carnival for his theme "Legends and Mysteries of the Amazon"; GRES Mocidade Independente de Padre Miguel in 1972 and 1973; and lastly Unidos da Tijuca in 1973.

He was born of Spanish and Swiss parents in Nova Friburgo, near Rio de Janeiro, where he died on October 9, 2005, at age 89. He started designing the 1930s until eventually starting at carnivals.

== Filmography ==
Year	Title	Role	Notes
1967	Entranced Earth	Portuguese conqueror	
1972	Independência ou Morte	Ambassador Pontois	
1978	O Gigante da América		
1979	Loucuras, o Bumbum de Ouro		(final film role)
