= Pedro Casaldáliga =

Spanish-born Brazilian Catholic prelate (1928–2020)

Pere Casaldáliga
- Bishop of São Félix do Araguaia
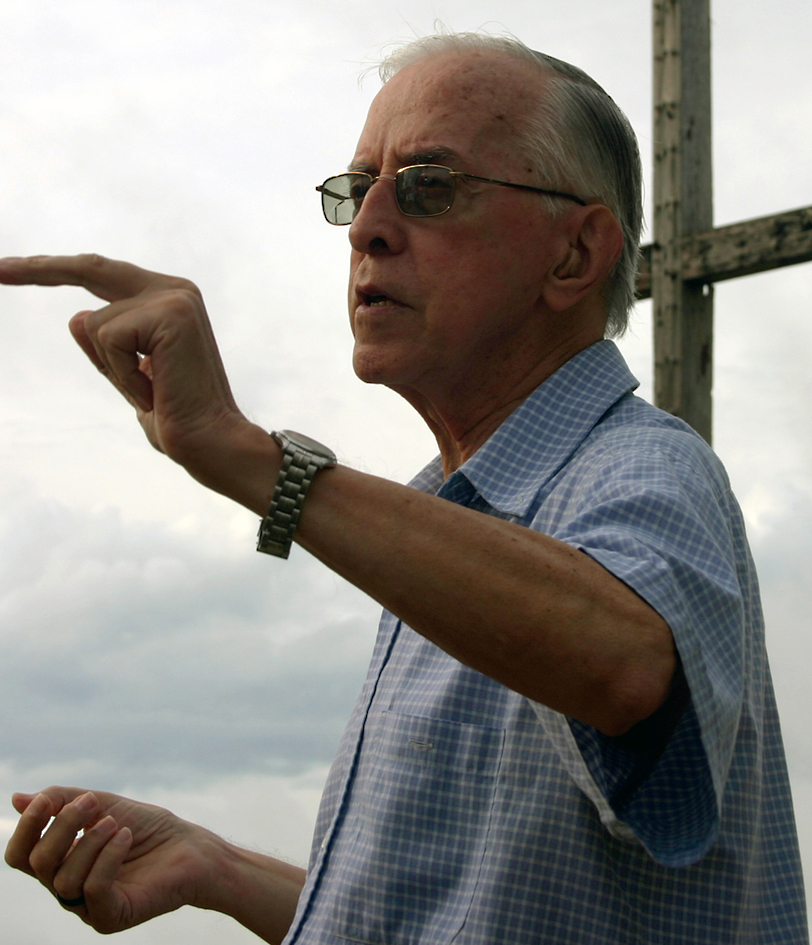
- Church: Roman Catholic Church
- Diocese: São Félix do Araguaia
- In office: 1971–2005
- Predecessor: Territorial prelature created
- Successor: Leonardo Ulrich Steiner

Orders
- Ordination: 31 May 1952
- Consecration: 23 October 1971 by Fernando Gomes dos Santos
- Rank: bishop

Personal details
- Born: Pere Casaldàliga i Pla; 16 February 1928 Balsareny, Catalonia, Spain
- Died: 8 August 2020 (aged 92) Batatais, São Paulo state, Brazil

Pere Casaldàliga i Pla CMF, known in Portuguese as Pedro Casaldáliga (16 February 1928 – 8 August 2020), was a Spanish-born Brazilian prelate of the Catholic Church who led the Territorial Prelature of São Félix, Brazil, from 1970 to 2005. A bishop since 1971, Casaldàliga was one of the best-known exponents of liberation theology. He received numerous awards, including the Catalonia International Prize in 2006. He was a forceful advocate in support of indigenous peoples and published several volumes of poetry.

== Biography ==
=== Beginnings ===
Pere Casaldàliga was born on 16 February 1928 in Balsareny, Catalonia, Spain, and grew up on his family's cattle ranch. He joined the Claretians, entering the Claretian Seminary of Vic at the age of nine. He was ordained a priest in Barcelona on 31 May 1952.

Casaldàliga moved to Brazil as a missionary in 1968. On 27 April 1970, Pope Paul VI named him Apostolic Administrator of the Territorial Prelature of São Félix. On 27 August 1971, Pope Paul named him prelate of that jurisdiction and titular bishop of Altava. He received his episcopal consecration in the night of 23 October 1971 from Fernando Gomes dos Santos, Archbishop of Goiânia near Araguaia river.

=== Brazilian dictatorship ===
In the 1970s, the military regime ruling Brazil tried without success to force Casaldàliga to leave the country. His advocacy for indigenous peoples and peasants resulted in repeated death threats, and in 1976 a priest was killed standing alongside him at a march protesting the mistreatment of female prisoners. In the 1980s, he refused to make the required ad limina visits to Rome that bishops normally make every five years. He said he feared not being able to re-enter Brazil and said "The visits were bureaucratic and formal and did not lead to proper dialogue."

Casaldàliga co-founded the Conselho Indigenista Missionário in 1972, an organ of the Episcopal Conference of Brazil that fights for the right to cultural diversity of indigenous peoples to strengthen its autonomy.

In 1986, Casaldàliga founded a pilgrimage, Romería de los Mártires, held every five years. It centers on the site where Jesuit João Bosco Bernier was killed at Casaldáliga's side on 11 October 1976, the Sanctuary of the Martyrs of the "Caminhada".

=== Liberation theology movement and friction with the Vatican ===
In June 1988, as part of a Vatican effort to place restrictions on the liberation theology movement and following its 1985 silencing of Brazilian theologian Leonardo Boff, Casaldáliga was called to Rome to be examined by Cardinals Joseph Ratzinger and Bernadin Gantin on his theological writings and pastoral activity. The Congregation for the Doctrine of the Faith (CDF) and the Congregation of Bishops produced a statement for him to sign as an acknowledgment of his errors. The statement decreed that he would not add political content to processions, would accept restrictions on his theological work, and only say Mass or preach outside of Brazil, especially in Nicaragua, with permission from the local bishop. He did not sign it. He summarized his views: "My attitude is a reflection of the view of the church in many regions of the world... I have criticized the Curia over the way bishops are chosen, over the minimal space given to women, over its distrust of liberation theology and bishops' conferences, over its excessive centralism. This does not mean a break with Rome. Within the family of the church and through dialogue, we need to open up more space."

Despite its regimen anti-religious policies, he was a self-described "passionate" supporter of the communist regimen of Cuba and Fidel Castro. In 1999, he published a "Love Declaration to the Total Revolution of Cuba" ("Declaração de Amor à Revolução Total de Cuba").

=== Later years ===
Pope John Paul II accepted Casaldàliga's resignation on 2 February 2005. Anticipating the appointment of his successor, he objected that it would happen without the people of the prelature being consulted. In retirement he continued to live in São Félix do Araguaia, (Note: As of 2018, the town had a population of 10,500. The nearest airport in Cuiabá, capital of the state of Mato Grosso, is reached by a 16-hour trip on dirt roads.) and work as an ordinary priest under his successors.

When the CDF criticized the work of theologian Jon Sobrino of El Salvador in 2007, Casaldáliga responded with an open letter asking that the Church confirm its “real commitment to the service of God’s poor" and acknowledge "the link between faith and politics". He had Parkinson's disease since at least 2012; he referred to it as "Brother Parkinson".

In 2015, Pope Francis consulted Casaldàliga, among others, during the writing of the encyclical Laudato si'.

== Death threats ==
Casaldàliga was the target of death threats, and even assassination attempts, throughout his life. In 1993 Amnesty International showed concern for the safety of Bishop Casaldàliga when landowners hired gunmen to kill him.

In December 2012, Casaldàliga had to flee his home, and the Federal Police hid him for two months after he received death threats from landowners from the region when he helped the Xavante people regain their land.

== Death ==
On 4 August 2020, Casaldàliga was admitted to the hospital for respiratory problems, being very weak due to his advanced state of Parkinson's disease. He tested negative for COVID-19.

Casaldàliga died on 8 August 2020, in Batatais, in the state of São Paulo.

== Awards and honors ==
- Creu de Sant Jordi (1990)
- (Brazil) Honoris causa for the University of Campinas (2000)
- International Catalonia Prize (2006).
- (Brazil) Order of Cultural Merit (2010).
- (Brazil) Honoris causa for the Pontifical Catholic University of Goiás (2012)
- (Brazil) Honoris causa for the Pontifical Catholic University of São Paulo (2014)

== Select writings ==
- África De Colores. Promoción Popular Cristiana, 1961.
- Creio na Justiça e na Esperança. Rio de Janeiro: Civilização Brasileira, 1977.
- Proclama del justo sufriente: relatos y poemas brasilero (con Frédy Kunz y Pedro Terra). Centro de Estudios y Publicaciones, 1979.
- Experiencia de Dios y Pasión por el Pueblo. Santander: Sal Terrae, 1983. ISBN 84-293-0670-6
- Comunidade, ecumenismo e libertação. São Paulo: EDUC, 1983. ISBN 85-050-0035-8
- Nicaragua, Combate y Profecía. San José de Costa Rica: DEI, 1987. ISBN 99-779-0439-1
- El vuelo del quetzal: espiritualidad en Centroamérica. Maíz Nuestro, 1988.
- Leonidas Proaño: El Obispo de Los Pobres (con Francisco Enríquez). Quito: El Conejo, Corporación Editorial, 1989. ISBN 9978-87-009-1
- Espiritualidad de la Liberación (con José Mª Vigil). Santander: Sal Terrae, 1992. ISBN 84-293-1076-2
- Sonetos neobíblicos, precisamente. Musa, Nueva Utopía, 1996.
- Ameríndia, morte e vida (con Pedro Terra). Petrópolis: Paulus, 1997.
- Murais da libertação (con Cerezo Barredo). São Paulo: Loyola, 2005.
- Orações da caminhada (con Pedro Terra). Verus Editora, 2005.
- Versos adversos: antologia (con Enio Squeff). Editora Fundação Perseu Abramo, 2006.
- Martírio do padre João Bosco Penido Burnier. São Paulo: Loyola, 2006. ISBN 85-15-03238-4
