= Hino de Pernambuco =

Anthem of Pernambuco, Brazil

- State Anthem of Pernambuco, Brazil
- Lyrics: Oscar Brandão da Rocha
- Music: Nicolino Milano, 1908

The Hino de Pernambuco (Anthem of Pernambuco), composed in 1908, is the official anthem of the Brazilian state of Pernambuco. The lyrics were written by Oscar Brandão da Rocha and the music was composed by Nicolino Milano.

== Lyrics ==
Anthem of Pernambuco
Portuguese	English
I Coração do Brasil! em teu seio Corre o sangue de heróis - rubro veio Que há de sempre o valor traduzir És a fonte da vida e da história Desse povo coberto de glória O primeiro, talvez, no porvir Coro: Salve ó terra dos altos coqueiros! De belezas soberbo estendal! Nova Roma de bravos guerreiros Pernambuco imortal! Imortal!	I Heart of Brazil! In your bosom runs the blood of heroes – a crimson vein that will always translate valor. You are the source of life and history of this people covered in glory, perhaps the first in the future. Chorus: Hail, land of tall coconut trees! Of superb beauty! New Rome of brave warriors, immortal Pernambuco! Immortal!
II Esses montes e vales e rios Proclamando o valor de teus brios, Reproduzem batalhas cruéis No presente és a guarda avançada Sentinela indormida e sagrada Que defende da Pátria os lauréis Coro	II These mountains and valleys and rivers, proclaiming the valor of your pride, reproduce cruel battles. In the present you are the advanced guard, a sleepless and sacred sentinel that defends the laurels of the Fatherland. Chorus
III Do futuro és a crença, a esperança Desse povo que altivo descansa Como o atleta depois de lutar No passado o teu nome era um mito Era o sol a brilhar no infinito Era a glória na terra a brilhar Coro	III From the future you are the belief, the hope Of this people who proudly rest Like the athlete after the fight In the past your name was a myth It was the sun shining in the infinite It was glory shining on earth Chorus
IV A República é filha de Olinda Alva estrela que fulge e não finda De esplender com seus raios de luz Liberdade! Um teu filho proclama! Dos escravos o peito se inflama Ante o Sol dessa terra da Cruz! Coro	IV The Republic is the daughter of Olinda White star that shines and never ends To shine with its rays of light Liberty! One of your sons proclaims! The hearts of slaves are inflamed Before the Sun of this land of the Cross! Chorus
