= Cupira, Pernambuco =

City in Pernambuco, Brazil

Cupira
- Municipality
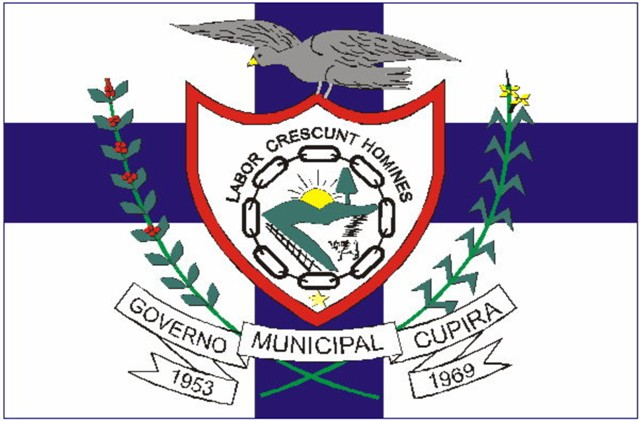
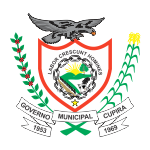
- Flag Coat of arms
- Etymology: Named after the Cupira (Partamona) bee
- Motto: Latin: Labor crescunt homines English: People work hard
- Location of Cupira in Pernambuco

- Location within Brazil Location within South America
- Coordinates: 08°37′01″S 35°57′00″W
- Country: Brazil
- Region: Northeast
- State: Pernambuco
- Founded: 29 December 1953

Government
  - Mayor: Eduardo da Fonseca Lira (UNIÃO) (2025-2028)
  - Vice Mayor: Golbery Lopes Lins (PL) (2025-2028)

Area
  - Total: 95.155 km^{2} (36.740 sq mi)
- Elevation: 416 m (1,365 ft)

Population (2022 Census)
  - Total: 23,518
  - Estimate (2025): 24,343
  - Density: 247.15/km^{2} (640.1/sq mi)
- Demonym: Cupirense (Brazilian Portuguese)
- Time zone: UTC-03:00 (Brasília Time)
- Postal code: 55460-000, 55465-000
- HDI (2010): 0.592 – medium
- Website: cupira.pe.gov.br

Cupira (Central northeastern portuguese pronunciation: [kuˈpiɾɐ]) (population 24,173) is a city in northeastern Brazil, in the State of Pernambuco. It lies in the mesoregion of Agreste of Pernambuco and has 105.92 sq/km of total area.

== Geography ==
- State - Pernambuco
- Region - Agreste of Pernambuco
- Boundaries - Agrestina, Altinho and São Joaquim do Monte (N); Lagoa dos Gatos (S); Belém de Maria (E); Panelas (W).
- Area - 105.92 km^{2}
- Elevation - 416 m
- Hydrography - Una river
- Vegetation - Subcaducifólia forest
- Annual average temperature - 23.4 c
- Distance to Recife - 170.5 km

== Economy ==
The main economic activities in Cupira are commerce and agribusiness, especially farming of cattle, goats, sheep, pigs; and plantations of sweet potatoes, beans and manioc.

=== Economic indicators ===
Population	GDP x(1000 R$).	GDP pc (R$)	PE
22.783	72.385	3.274	0.12%

Economy by sector
2006

Primary sector	Secondary sector	Service sector
3.82%	10.92%	85.26%

=== Health indicators ===
HDI (2000)	Hospitals (2007)	Hospitals beds (2007)	Children's Mortality every 1000 (2005)
0.606	1	29	14.0

== See also ==
- List of municipalities in Pernambuco
