= Gravatá =

Municipality of Pernambuco, Brazil

- Municipality of Pernambuco, Brazil
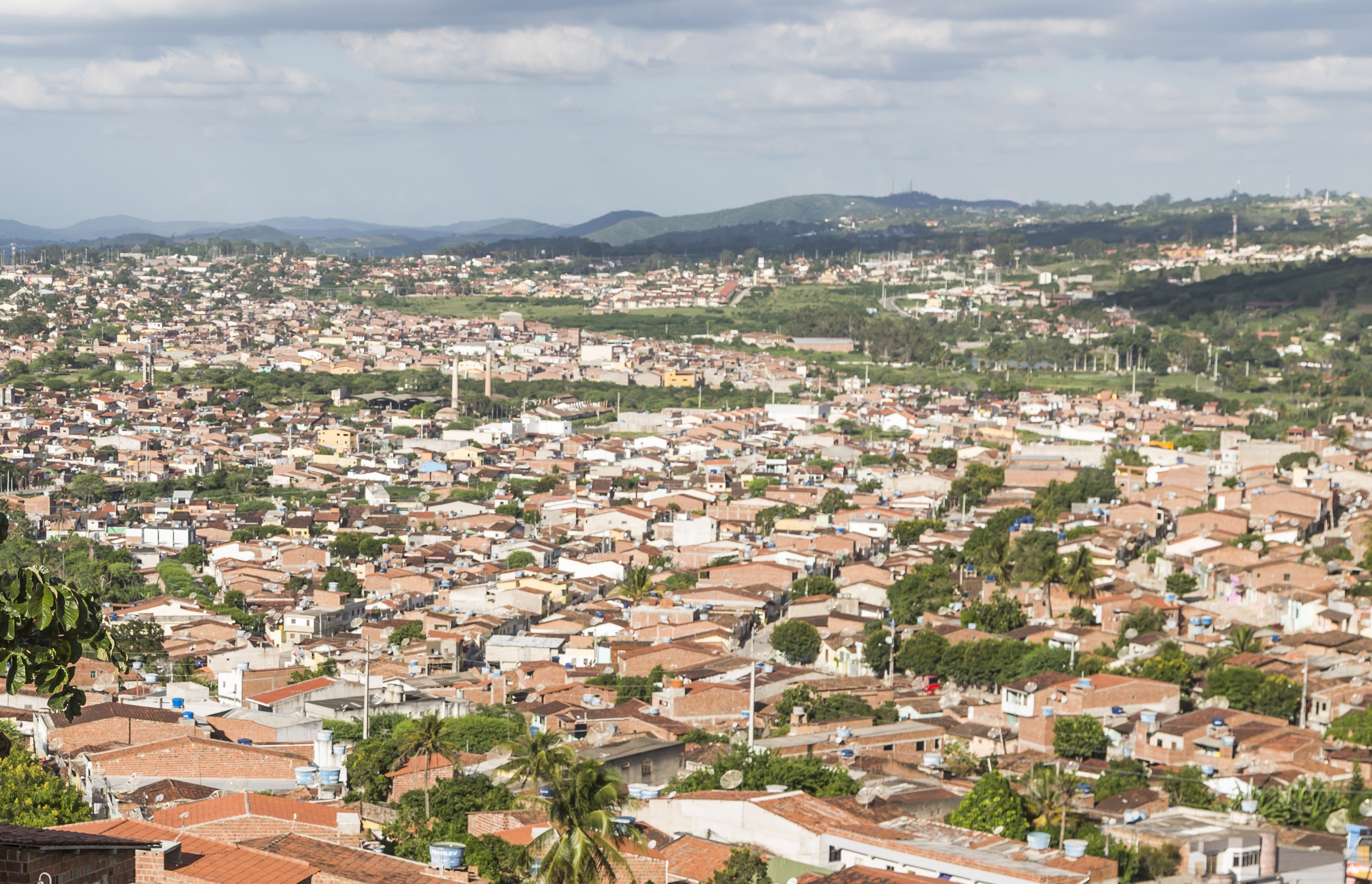
- View of Gravatá

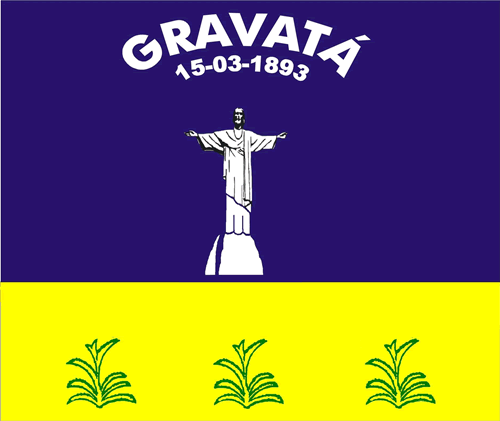
- Flag
- Etymology: Named after the Neoglaziovia variegata plant, which is abundant in the area
- Location of Gravatá in Pernambuco

- Location within Brazil Location within South America
- Coordinates: 8°11′59″S 35°34′0″W
- Country: Brazil
- Region: Northeast
- State: Pernambuco
- Founded: 15 March 1893

Government
  - Mayor: Joselito Gomes da Silva (Avante) (2025-2028)
  - Vice Mayor: João Paulo de Lemos (PSB) (2025-2028)

Area
  - Total: 507.360 km^{2} (195.893 sq mi)
- Elevation: 447 m (1,467 ft)

Population (2022 Census)
  - Total: 86,516
  - Estimate (2025): 92,429
  - Density: 170.52/km^{2} (441.6/sq mi)
- Demonym: Gravataense (Brazilian Portuguese)
- Time zone: UTC-03:00 (Brasília Time)
- Postal code: 55646-000, 55647-000, 55648-000
- HDI (2010): 0.634 – medium
- Website: gravata.pe.gov.br

Gravatá (Portuguese pronunciation: [[ɡɾɐvɐˈta]]) is a city in the state of Pernambuco, Brazil, located about 75 km (47 mi) from the state's capital Recife (the distance by road is 85 km or 53 mi). The population of Gravatá in 2022 was 86.516 inhabitants, according with IBGE.

== Geography ==
Gravatá is located at 08°12′04″S 35°33′53″W. The average altitude is 447 metres (1,467 ft). The area of Gravatá is 491.53 km^{2} (189.78 sq mi). It is known for a pleasant climate (annual medium temperature 18 °C or 64.4 °F) and its charming houses with an Alpine architecture; it is placed in the rural countryside of Pernambuco (Agreste Pernambucano). Located in the rural district of the valley of Ipojuca (Vale do Ipojuca), a transition area between the Forest and the Rural Area, in Borborema Plateau; it is part of the basin Capibaribe. Being an important regional centre town, it is linked to Recife by a federal highway (BR-232), which passes also Vitória de Santo Antão and Jaboatão dos Guararapes.

The characteristic vegetation in Gravatá are savannahs, natural pastures, swamp, sandbanks and forests.

Administratively, the municipal district is composed of the district Gravatá itself and the municipals of Uruçu-Mirim, Russinhas, São Severino de Gravatá, Avencas and Ilha Energética.

== History ==
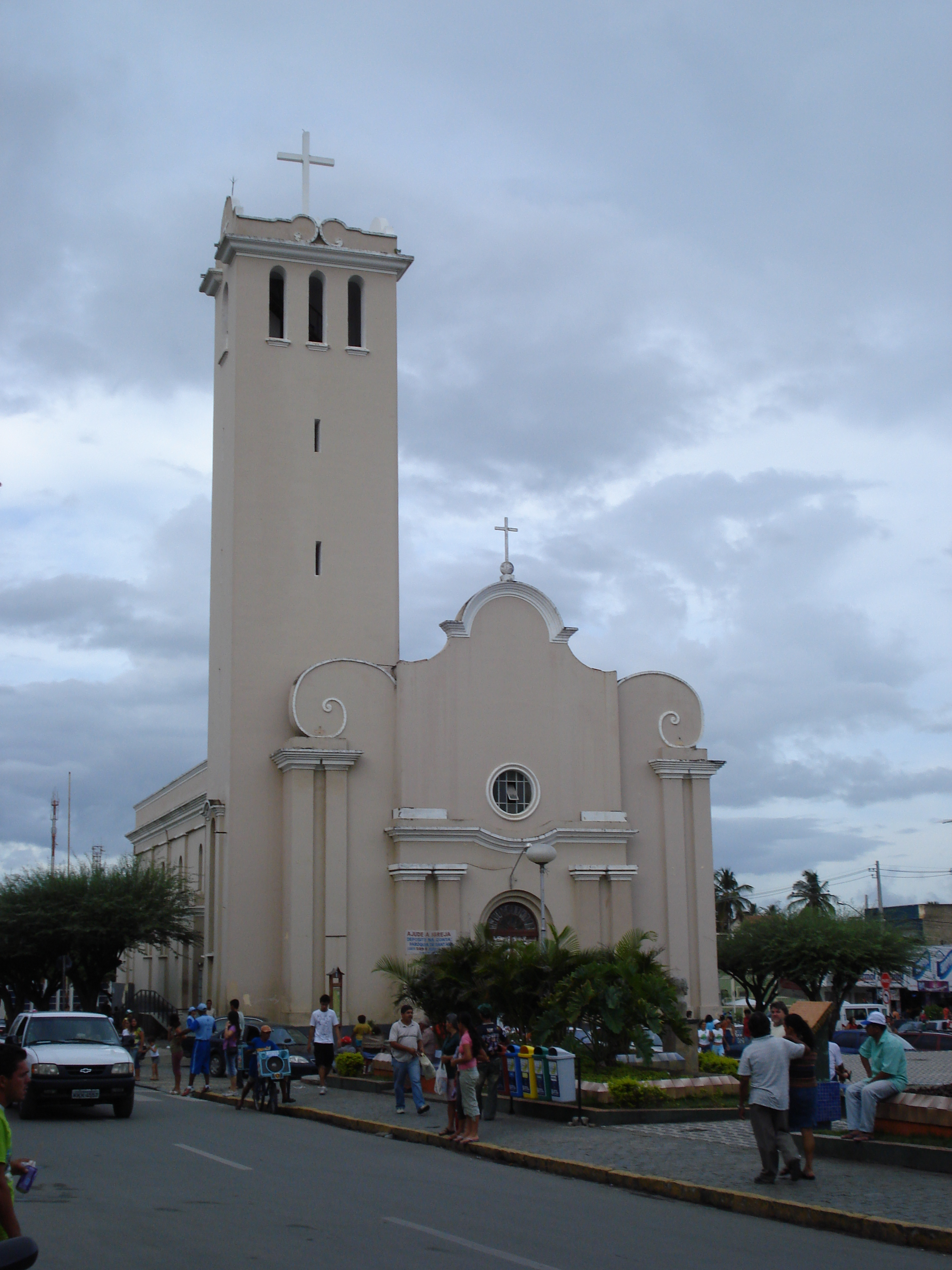
Chapel Sant'Ana

The municipal district of Gravatá had its origins in a farm, which in 1808, belonging to José Justino Carreiro de Miranda, served as a lodging place for travellers and sold mainly sugar and beef. Travelling along the river Ipojuca from Recife towards the inside of the country was difficult in those times. The merchants were forced to make strategic stops to avoid the cattle losing weight. One of those resting-places was known as "Crauatá", derived from the Tupi name "Karawata" (mato que fura) for the place, due to the predominance of the plant Bromelia pinguin belonging to the pineapple family also called Caraguatá, Caroatá, Caróa and Gravatá.

It was at the end of the 18th century, that José Justino Carreio de Miranda took ownership of the Fazenda Gravatá, which for a long time served as lodging for travelers. As a natural consequence, on the two sides of the river two populations developed. In 1810 the construction of the chapel Sant'Ana was started to be completed 12 years later by João Félix Justiniano, the son of José Justino Carreiro de Miranda.

Soon afterwards, the grounds were divided in 100 lots and sold to the residents, leading off the town of Gravatá (Cidade de Gravatá), being a district of the municipal district Bezerros. In 1875, the freguesia was created, and on May 30, 1881 Gravatá became a town (municipio) due to the Law provincial no. 1.560 (Lei Provincial n°. 1.560), and the former chapel was transformed to a mother church. On June 13, 1884, the main place of the municipal district was elevated to the category of a city (Lei Provicial n° 1.805). However, political emancipation only came to happen after the Proclamation the Republic. by the Organic Act of the Municipal district of March 15, 1893, when the city's municipality gained autonomy and elected its first mayor, Antonio Avelino do Rêgo Barros.

In the end of the 19th century, with the inauguration of the Great Westerns Railways, linking Recife to the interior from Pernambuco, the city took considerable pulse and, little by little, vocation was defined for tourism, above all with the construction of the road BR-232, in the Mountains of Russians (Serra das Russas).

=== The Great Westerns Railways ===
The railroad between Recife and Gravatá was built in the years 1881 to 1894. The biggest problem in this project was the mountainous landscape around Gravatá, so that it was necessary to construct a lot of bridges and tunnels. The Grota Funda bridge e.g. has a length of 180 m (591 ft) and a height of 48 m (157 ft). In the years 1945 to 1947 the railroad was reconditioned: the iron bridges were replaced by ferroconcrete bridges. In 1986 the railroad was cited for the breathtaking landscape around.

The importance of the railroad is caused by the development of the interior from Pernambuco: now it was possible to transfer goods and people in a reasonable time and in big quantities. This caused an economic upswing in the interior, because of a strengthening of trade and tourism.

== Tourism ==
Gravatá itself has approximately 75,000 inhabitants, but in the weekends it occurs that population amounts to about 130,000 people: many tourists come to enjoy the cold and pleasant climate of the city. During the year, there are several events happening in the municipal district which lure growing numbers of tourists to the town.

- In January, on second Sunday, it promotes the traditional Festa de Reis.
- In February, blocks do the pré-carnival week.
- During the Easter-Week in April, Gravatá is one of the biggest centres of animation of the state, being included in the Itinerary of the Passion. In that period, local actors show Christ's Passion on stage and great musical shows are promoted. An estimated 300,000 people visit Gravatá during this time.
- In the month may, there opens up space for the religious tourism, with Frei Damião's Festivities. A great walk leaves the church (Nossa Senhora de Sant'Ana) towards the Chapel Capela do Riacho do Mel (chapel of the river of honey), where Frei Damião had celebrated his first mass in Brazil.
- In June, São João, although only in existence since 2002, already has become one of the largest and best of the country. In the first fortnight of the month the Community São João is accomplished, which means a caravan that leaves downtown, all the nights, bound for a neighborhood or district, with flags and balloons, gang, trios and a lot typical food, total free. In the second fortnight, in the fairground, all over decorated with flags and balloons, gang contests are accomplished and shows of national artists take place, besides local and regional attractions. In this period, the number of visitors to the city reaches the 500,000 people mark.
- In the first week of August, the Feira da Estação takes place, containing the Circuit the Cold, an event organised by the Government of the State, which travels to the cities of Pernambuco with workshops and cultural and musical presentations.
- In September, the economical sector (pieces of furniture, craft, gastronomy, flowers and strawberries) organise the Cultural Festival.
- In December, the main streets and squares of the city are contemplated with a decoration and all special illumination for Paz's Christmas (Paixão de Cristo). Artists of all the styles (dance academies, corals, theater and bands) present themselves in the central places.

== Economy ==
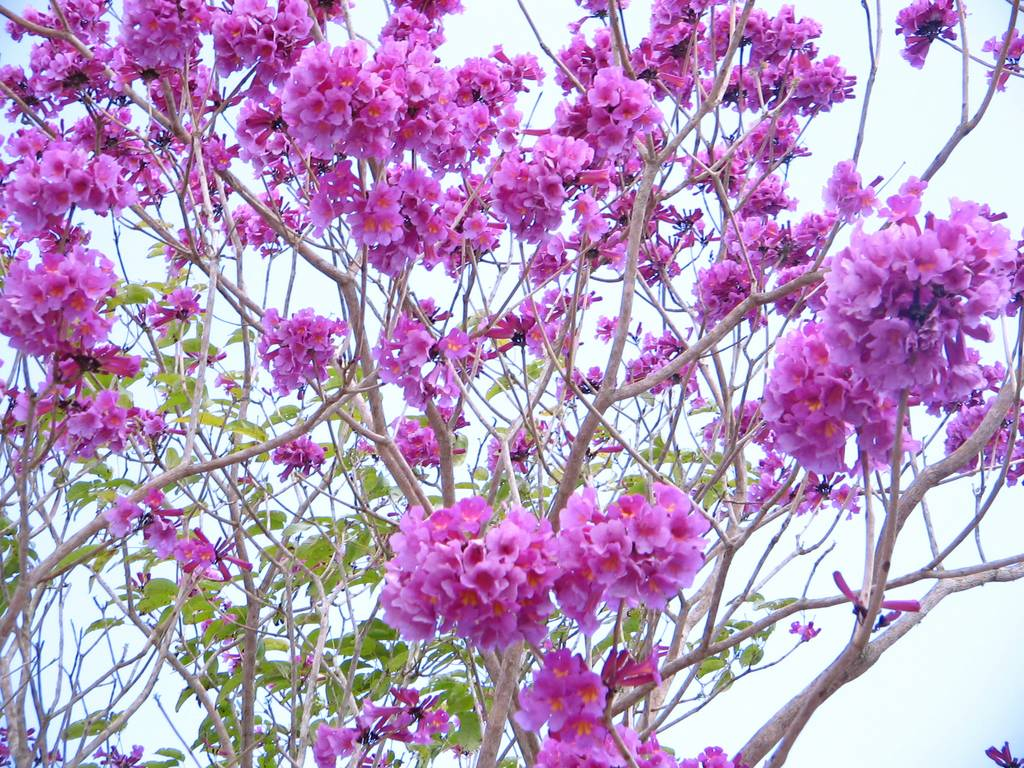
Largest producer of temperate flowers in the Northeast

Gravatá's main economical activity is agriculture (pineapple, corn, cotton, sweet, potato, tomato, tangerine, bean, banana, cassava, strawberry), the retail trade and livestock. In the retail trade, items consist of "artesanato", hand crafts made for home and garden as well as accessories. It is said the most beautiful costume jewelry, made from crystals and semi-precious stones are made in Gravata.

Being an important producer of vegetable in rural Pernambuco, Gravatá produces and sells an average of 2 tons a week, at fairs in the proper town as well as in Caruaru and Recife. An important economical branch is also the cultivation of plants and flowers, producing several types of roses, chrysanthemums and other species of flowers, Gravatá is the municipal district with the largest production of temperate flowers in the Northeast.

Another important activity consists in the manufacturing of rustic furniture made of solid wood, mimbre and rattan. Also, there are numerous artisans of various crafts in Gravatá.

In the sector of animal breeding, Gravatá breeds horses, cattle, sheep and caprine. There are also numerous dog breeders Rottweiler, Boxer and Cocker Spaniel.

=== Real estate ===
The real estate section of Gravatá is one of the most important in the interior from Pernambuco, due to the duplication BR-232 (today denominated Rodovia Luiz Gonzaga) and for the offer lands and rural condominiums that multiply. According to the brokers, besides the municipal district to have the most expensive square meter in the State, it is the place where most houses are built in Pernambuco, with an average of five a day.

=== Economic Indicators ===
Population	GDP x(1000 R$).	GDP pc (R$)	PE
86.516	306.637	4.284	0.50%

Economy by Sector 2006

Primary sector	Secondary sector	Service sector
6.34%	16.07%	77.59%

== Landmarks ==
- Alto do Cruzeiro, where to find Cristo Redeemer's statue (Cristo Redentor). Access is possible by the 365 steps of the stairs denominated Escadaria da Felicidade (Staircase of Happiness). There's gastronomy as well as the possibility to observe the sunset.
- Polo Moveleiro is the marketplace for rustic furniture made in solid wood.
- Estação do Artesão (Artist's station), located at the former railway-station the old station, just beside the fairground Patio de Eventos Chucre Mussa Zarzar, where the local artisans sell their artworks.
- the City - Memorial Memorial da Cidade, located in the old building of the Cadeia Pública.
- Banho de Dona Nadir (Bath of Dona Nadir), at 12 km distance from the city, with natural swimming pools.
- Architecture, with their constructions of the last centuries, as the City hall Sede da Prefeitura (1908), the church Igreja Matriz de Santa'Ana (1810), the houses of the avenue and the Chapel the Cruise, that give an all special charm to the City.

== Gallery ==
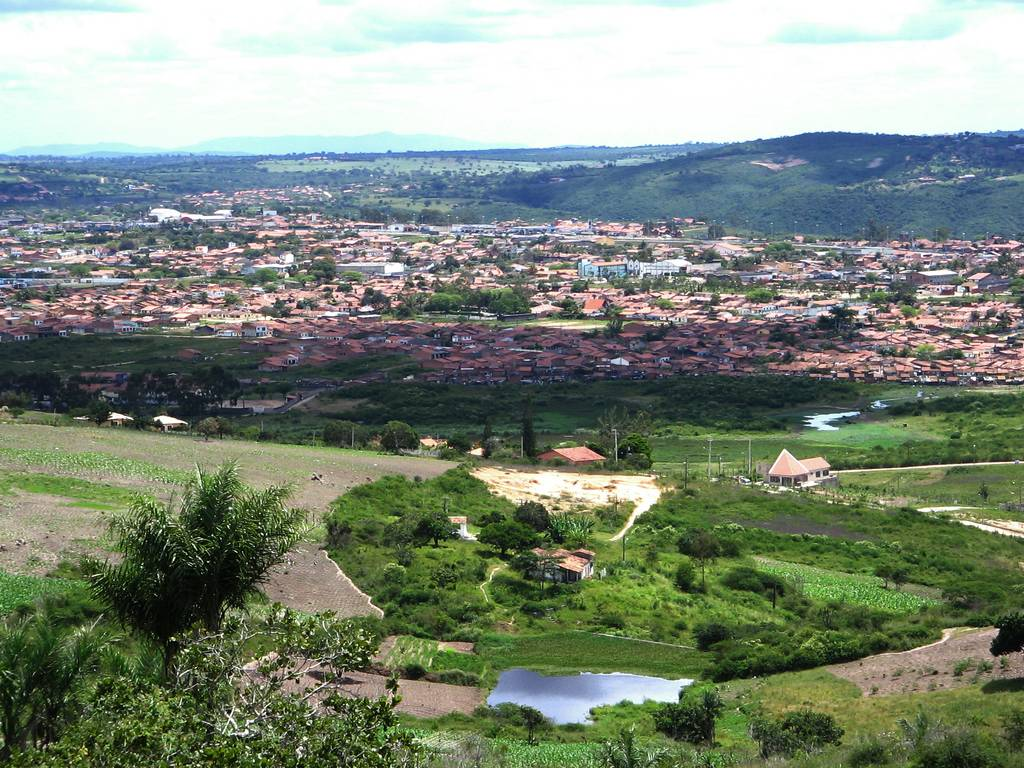
View of Gravatá

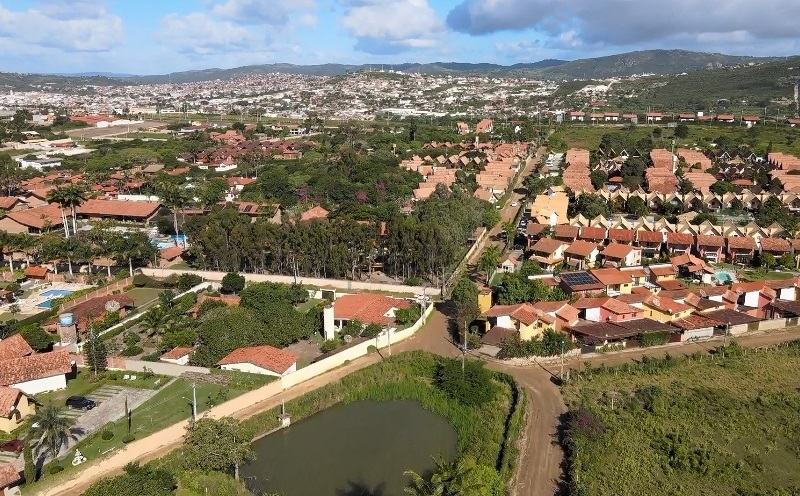
Aerial view of Gravatá

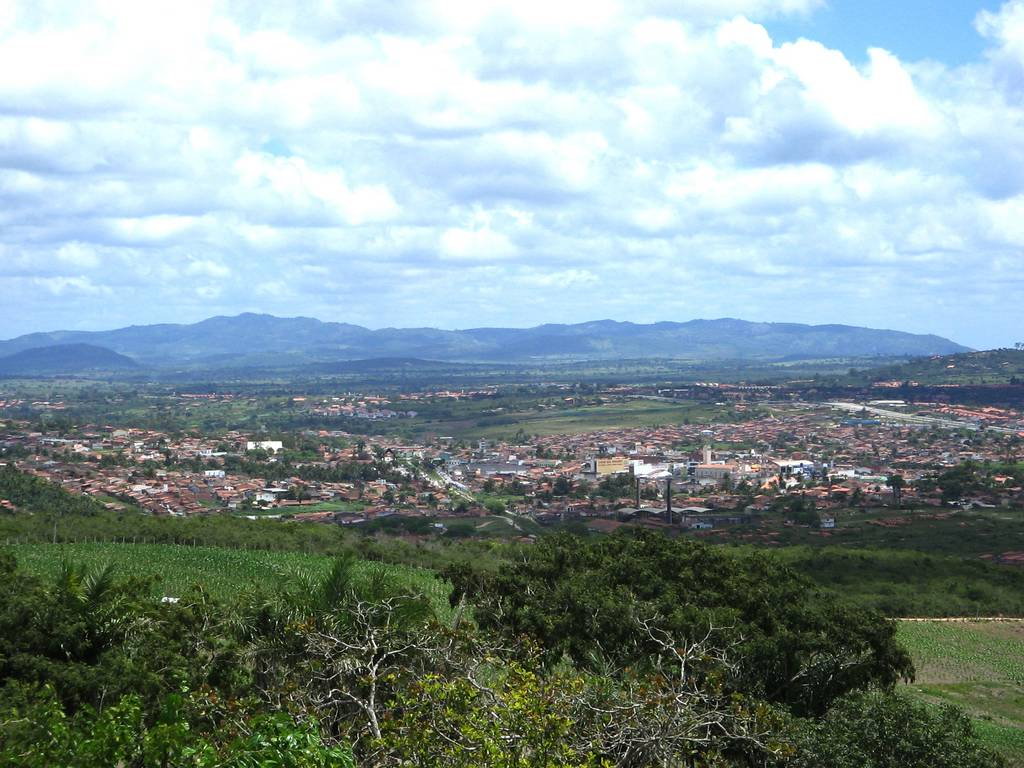
View of Gravatá

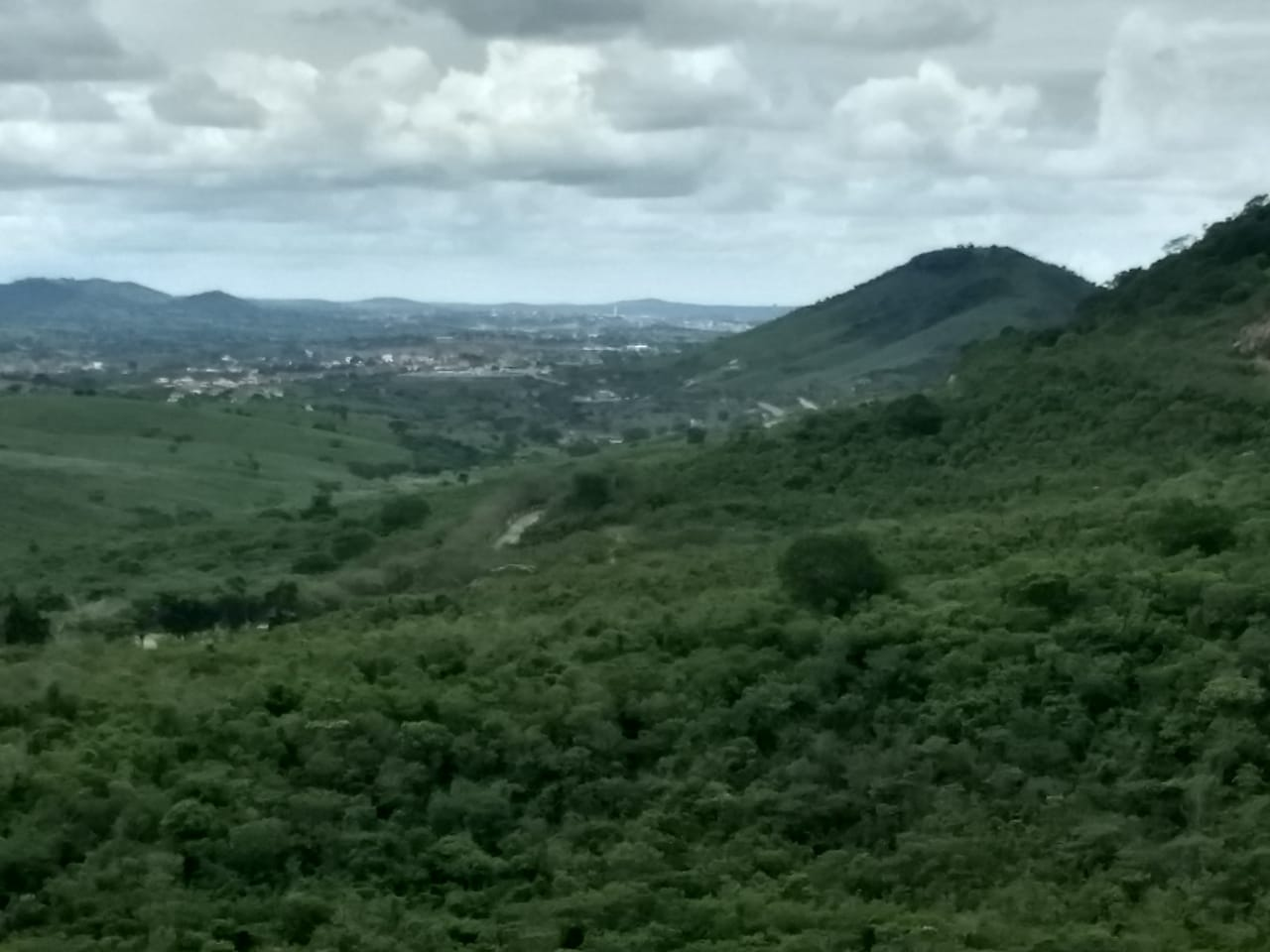
View of Gravatá

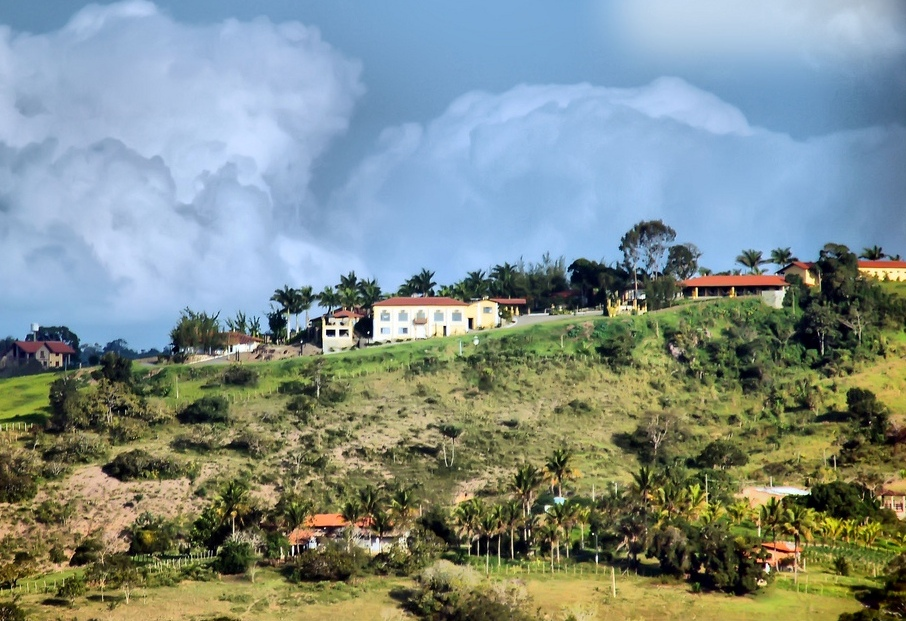
View of Gravatá

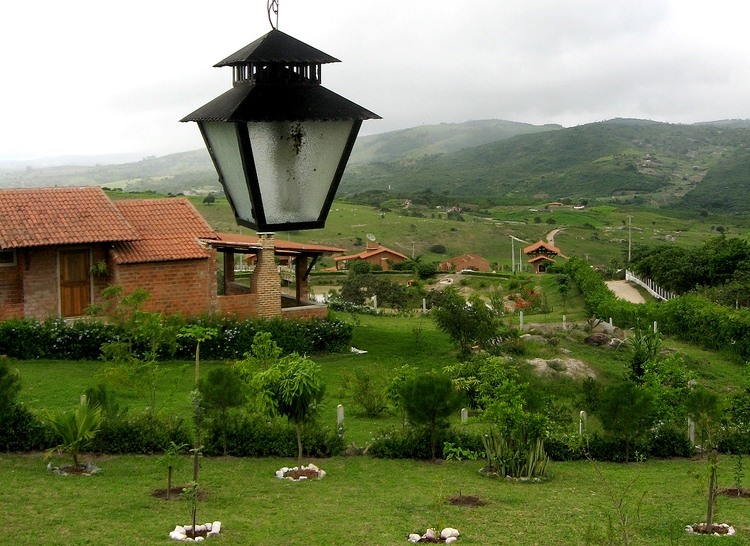
View of Gravatá

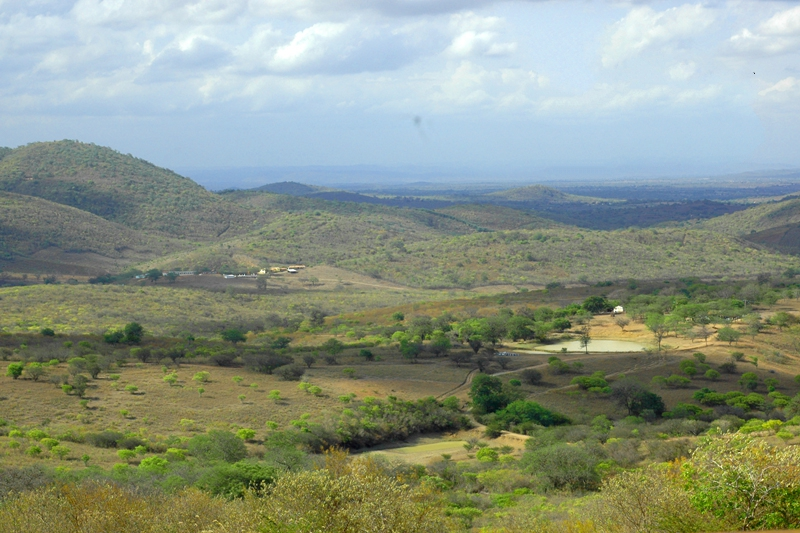
View of Gravatá's countryside

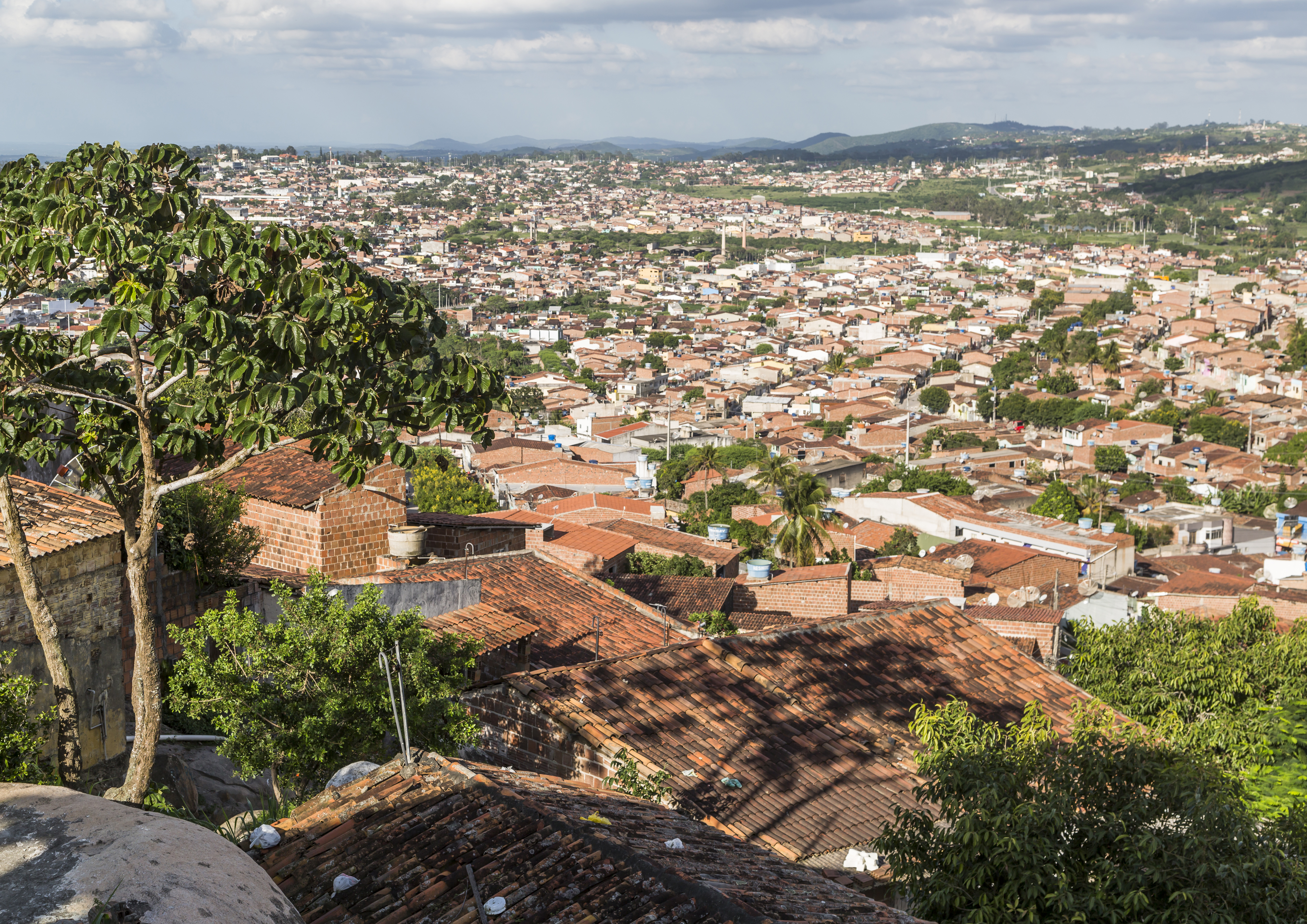
View of Gravatá

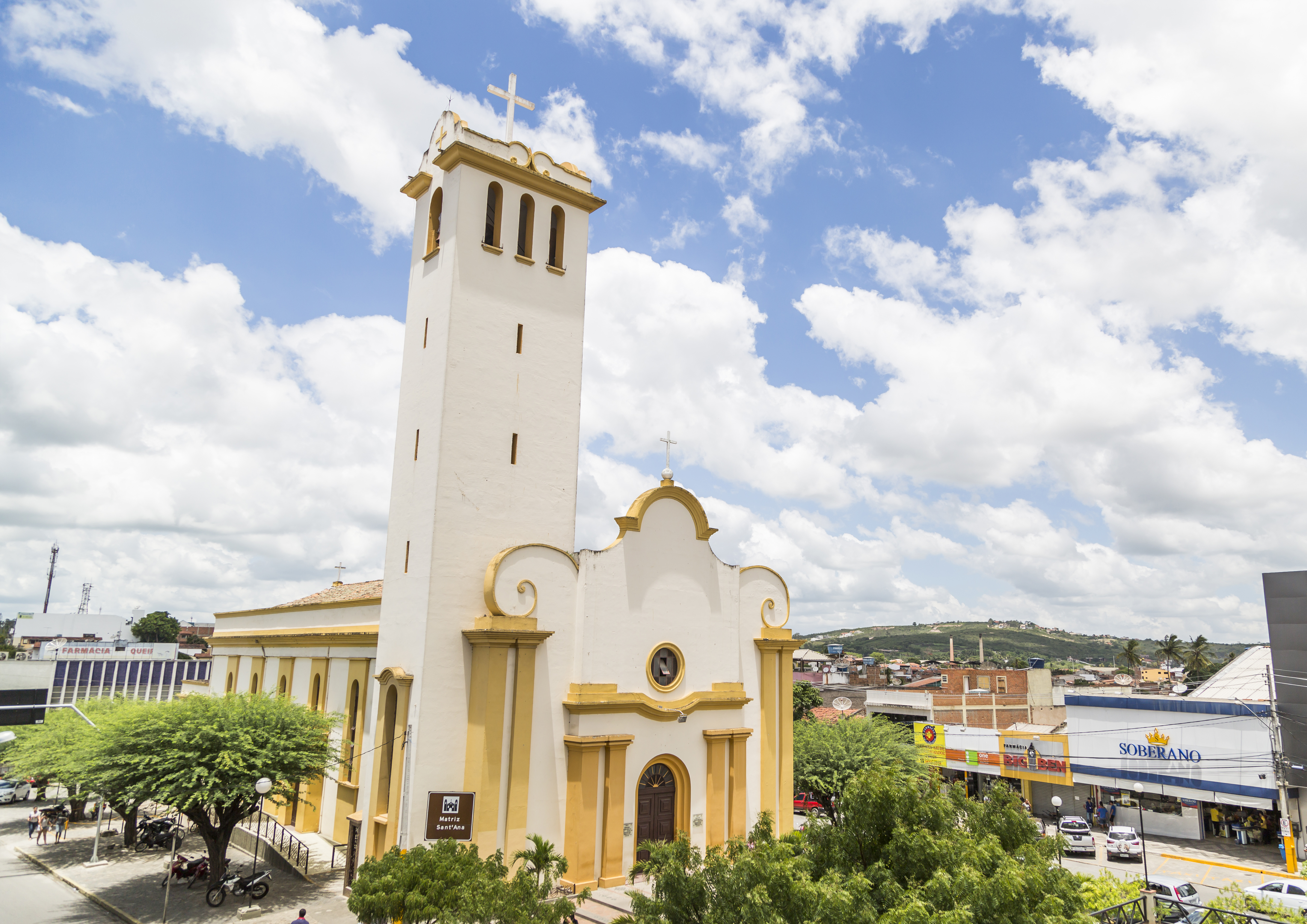
Sant'Ana Parish church

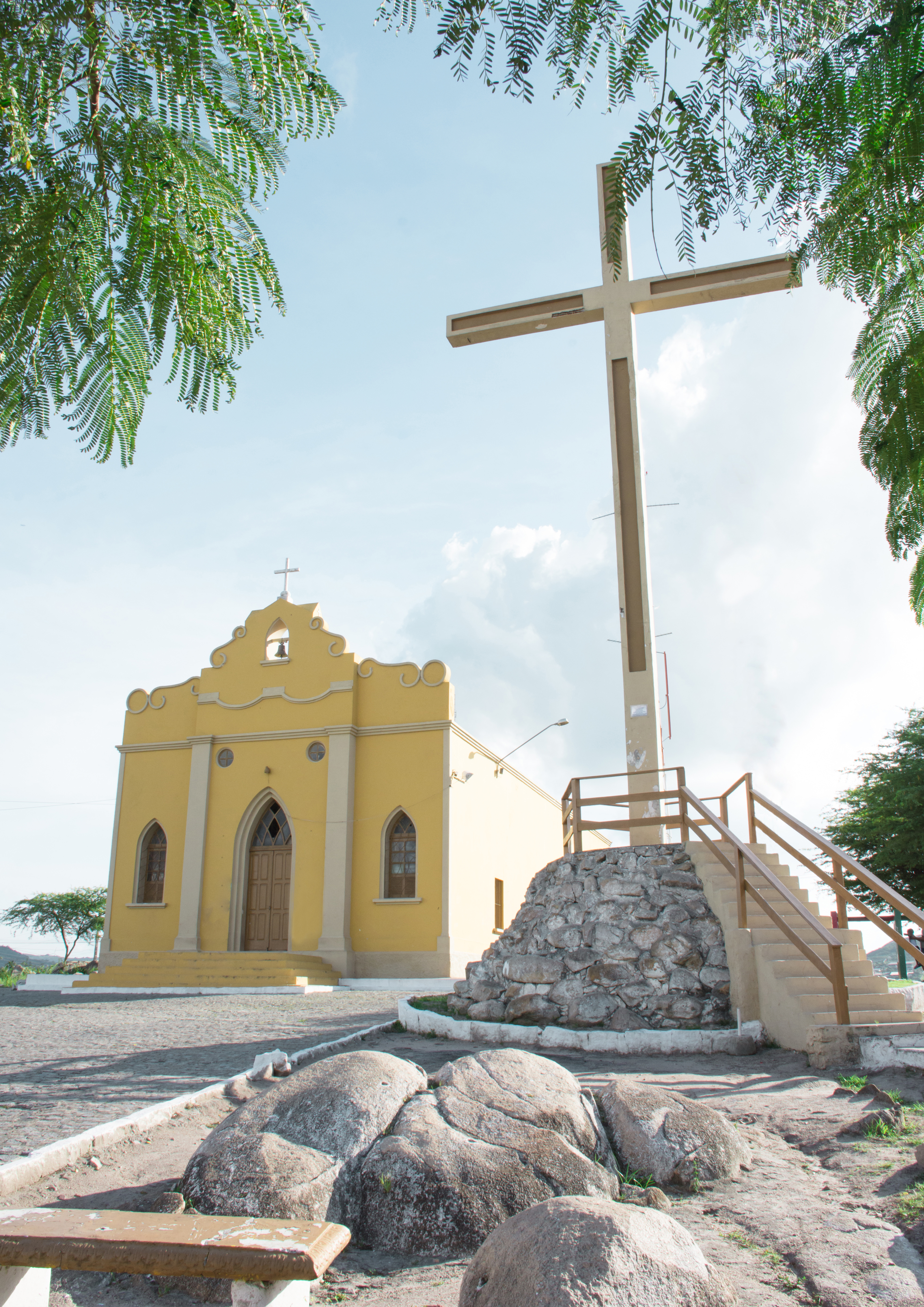
Chapel of Christ the King

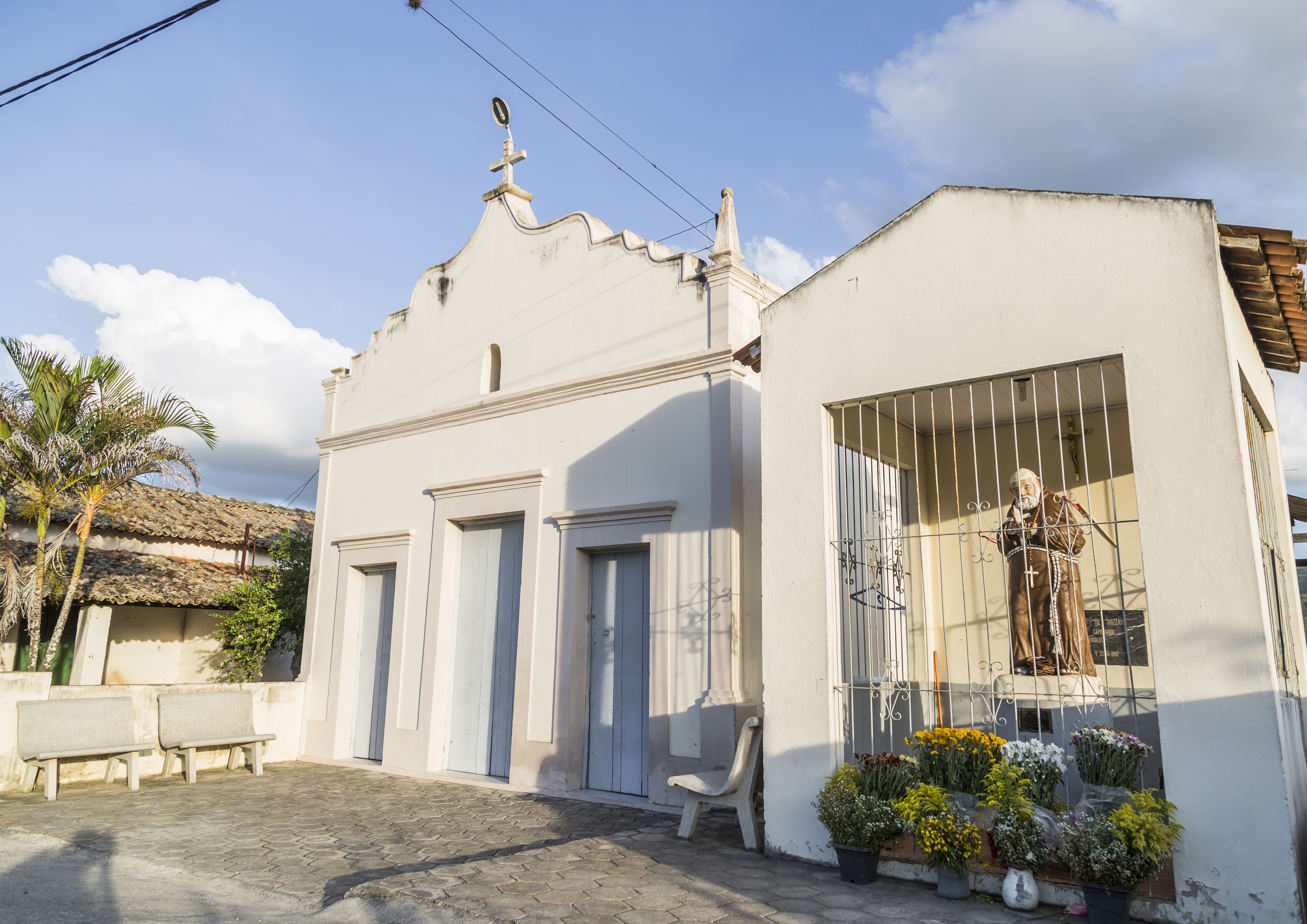
Chapel of Friar Damião

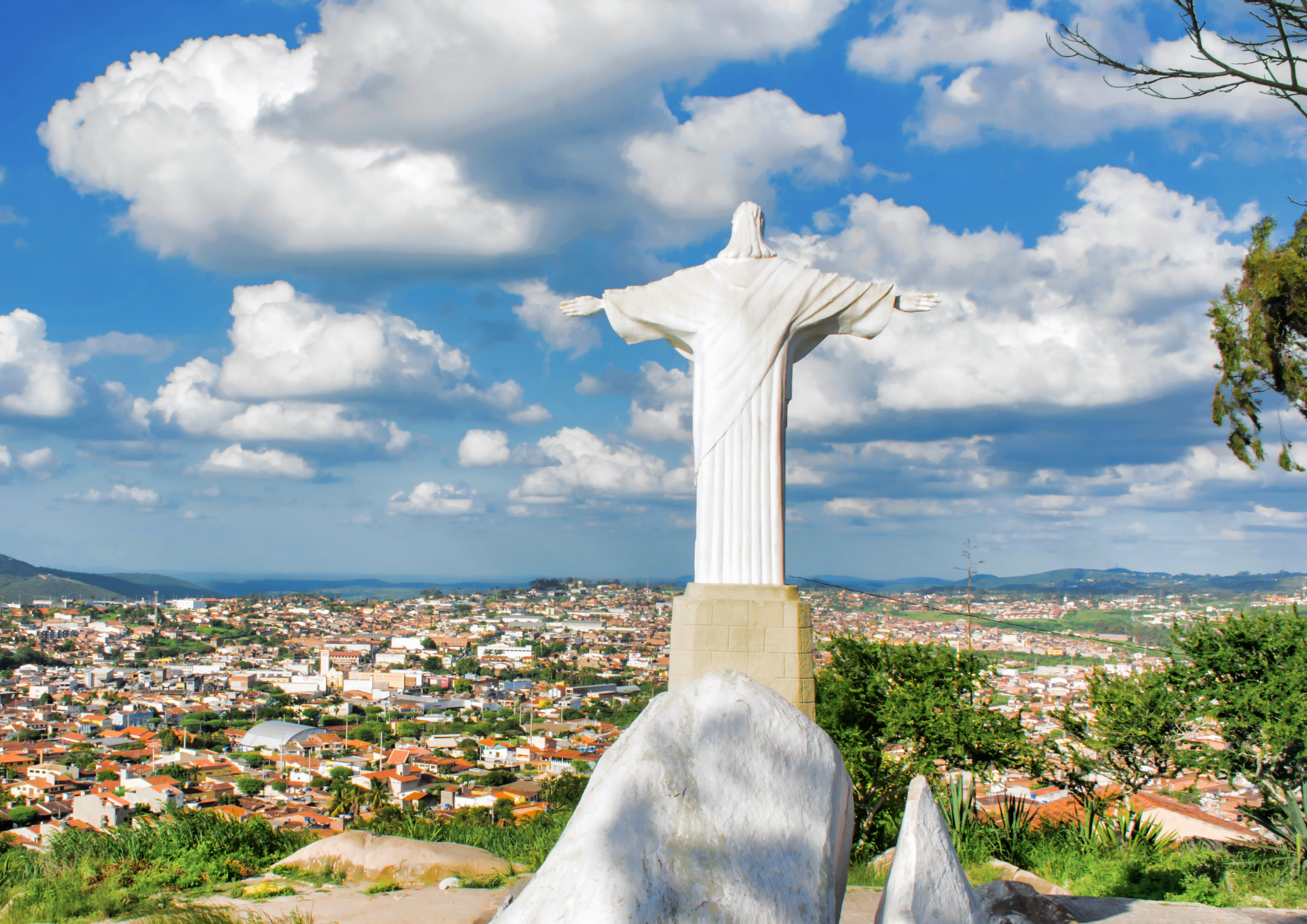
Christ the Redeemer monument

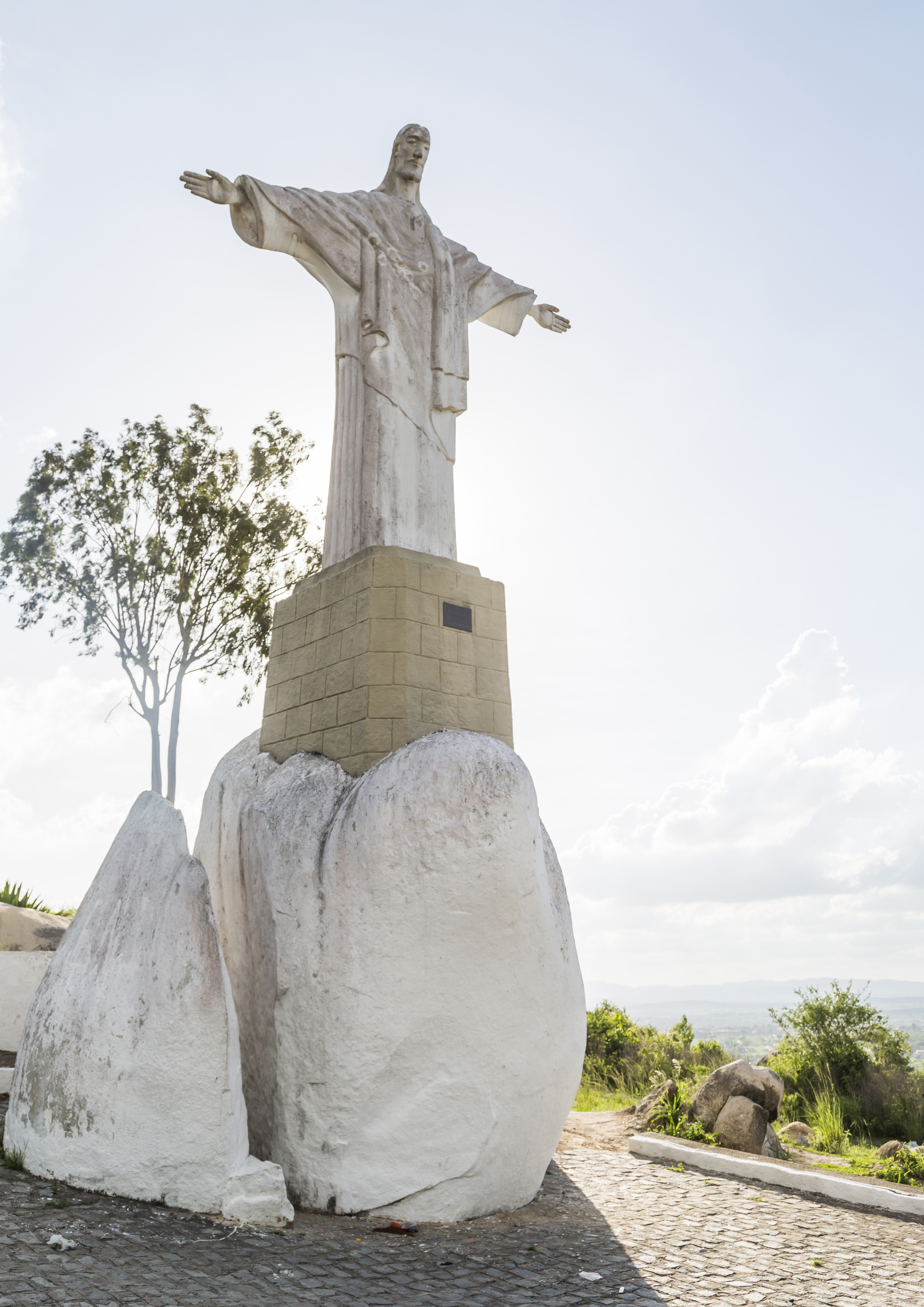
Christ the Redeemer monument

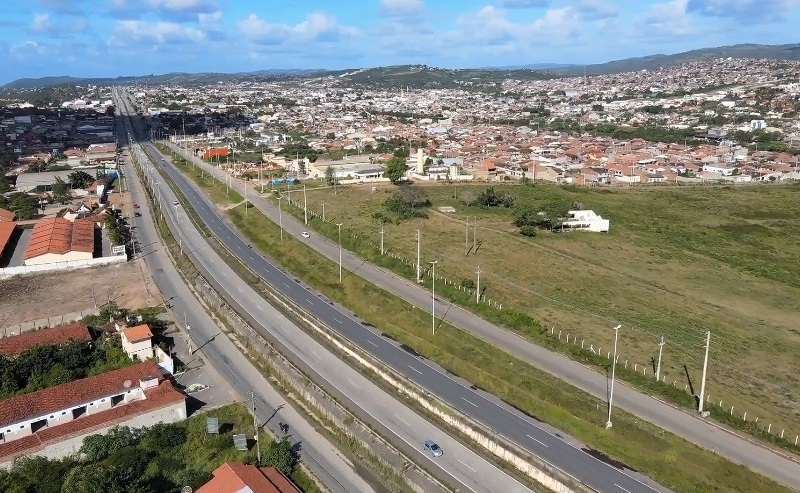
Aerial view of Gravatá

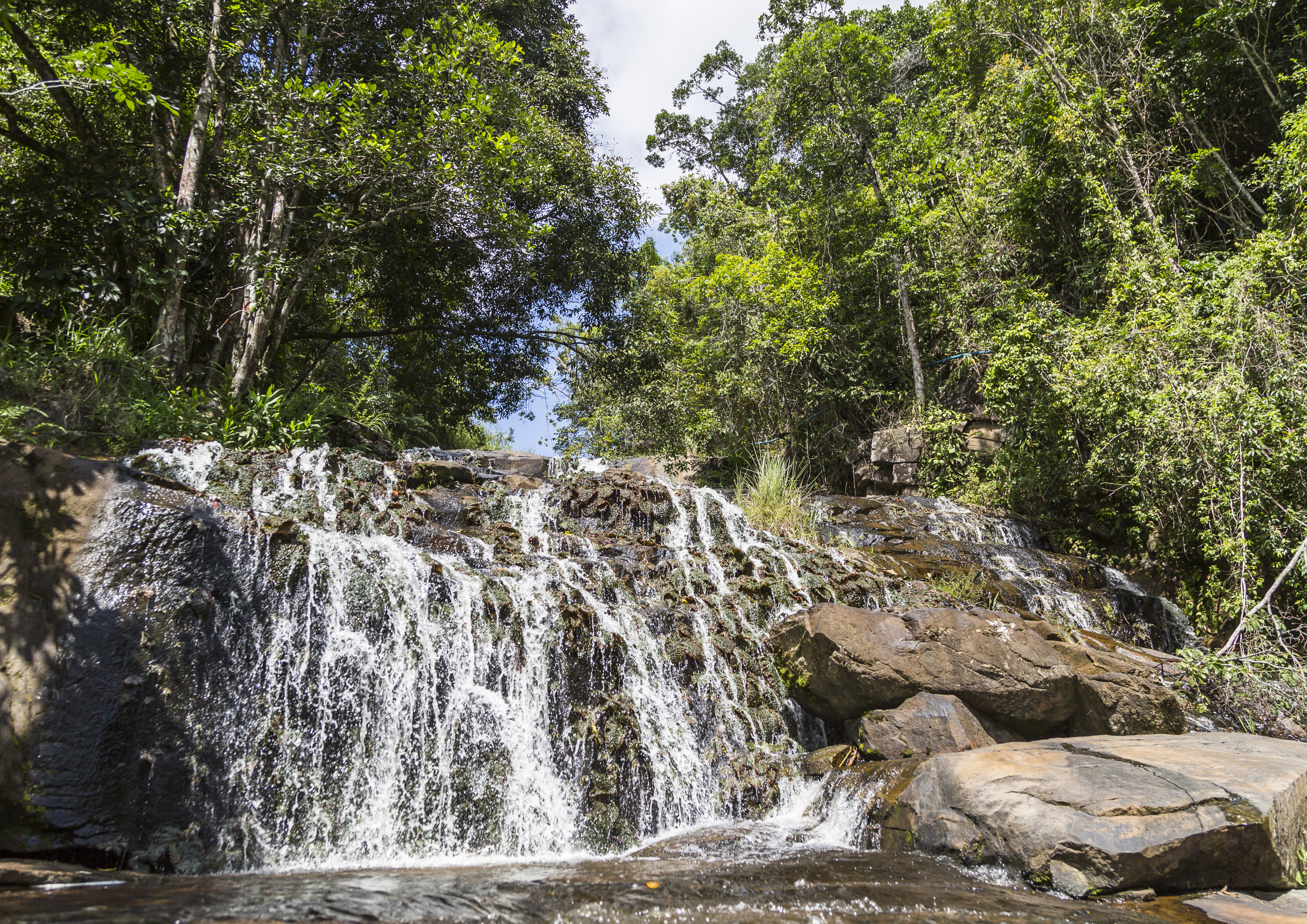
Waterfall of the Palmeiras

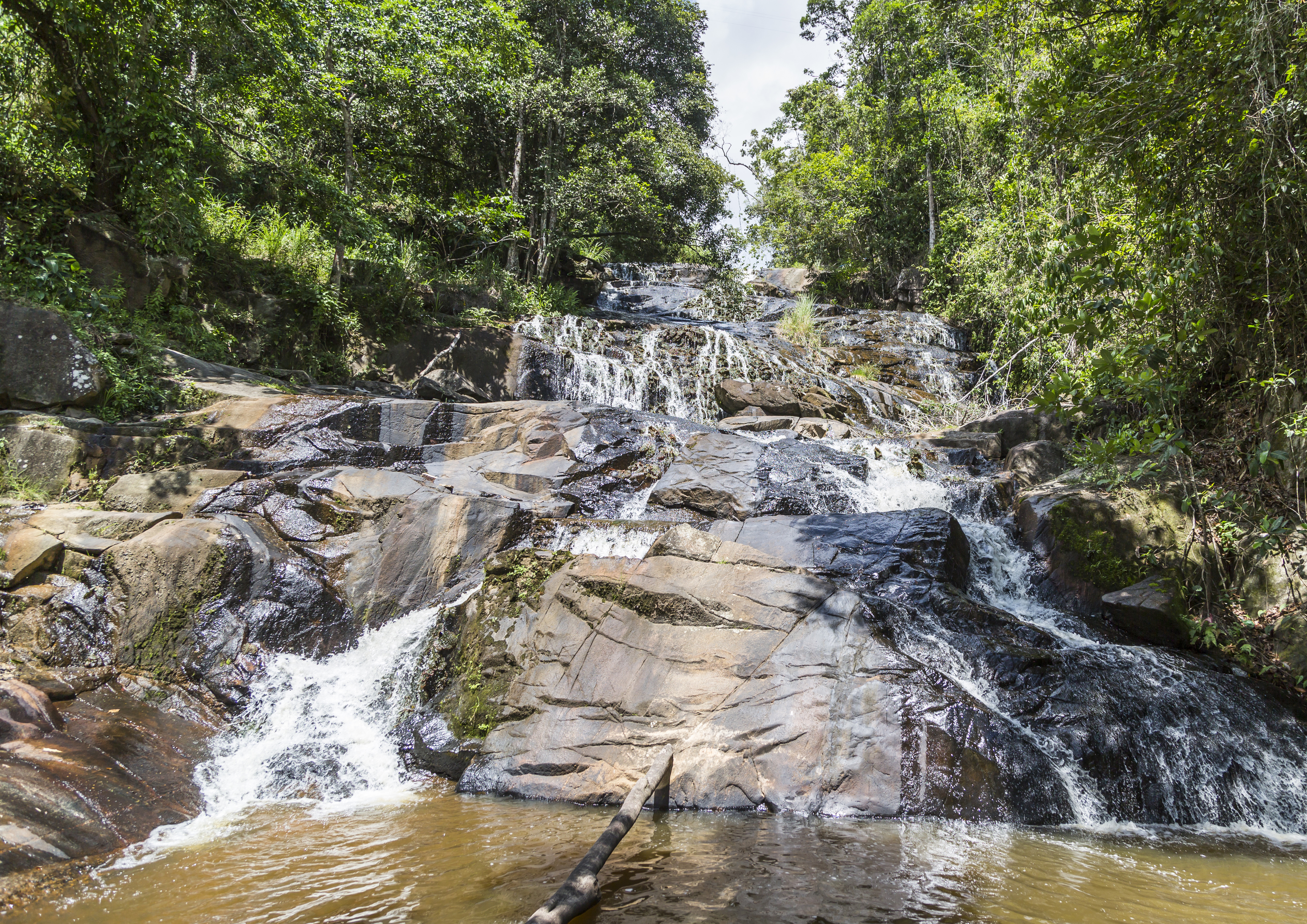
Waterfall of the Palmeiras

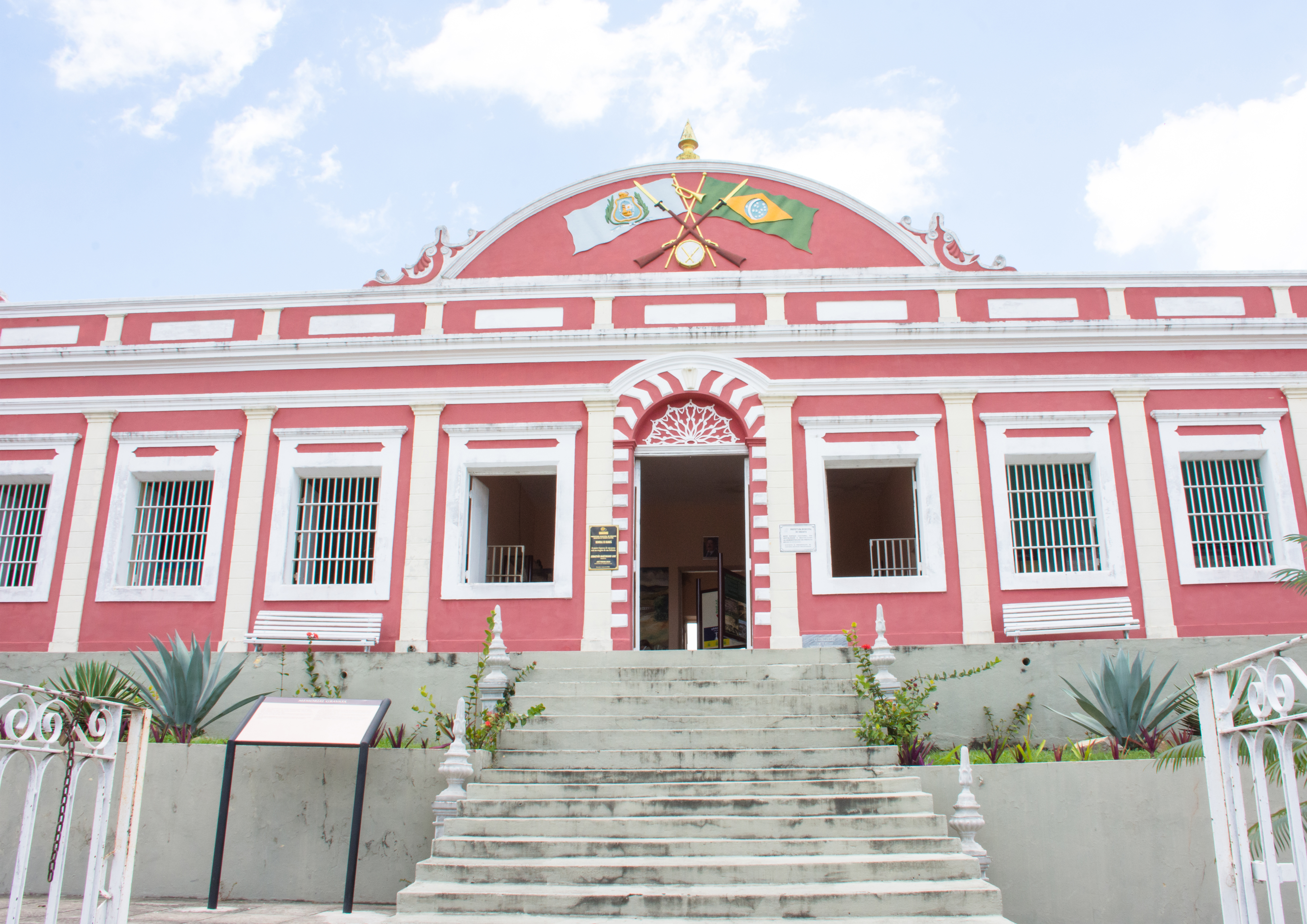
Municipal Memorial of Gravatá

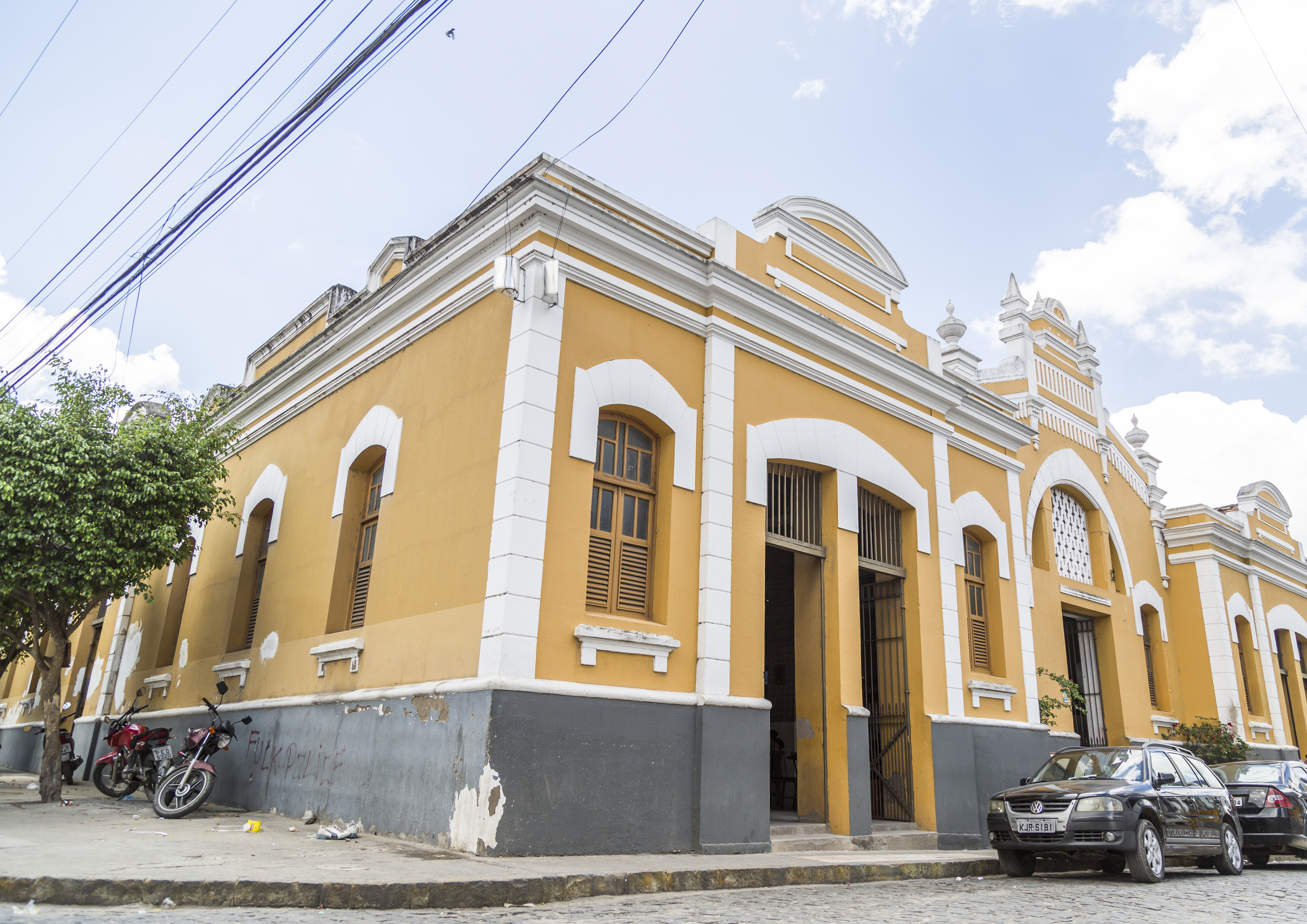
Cultural Market

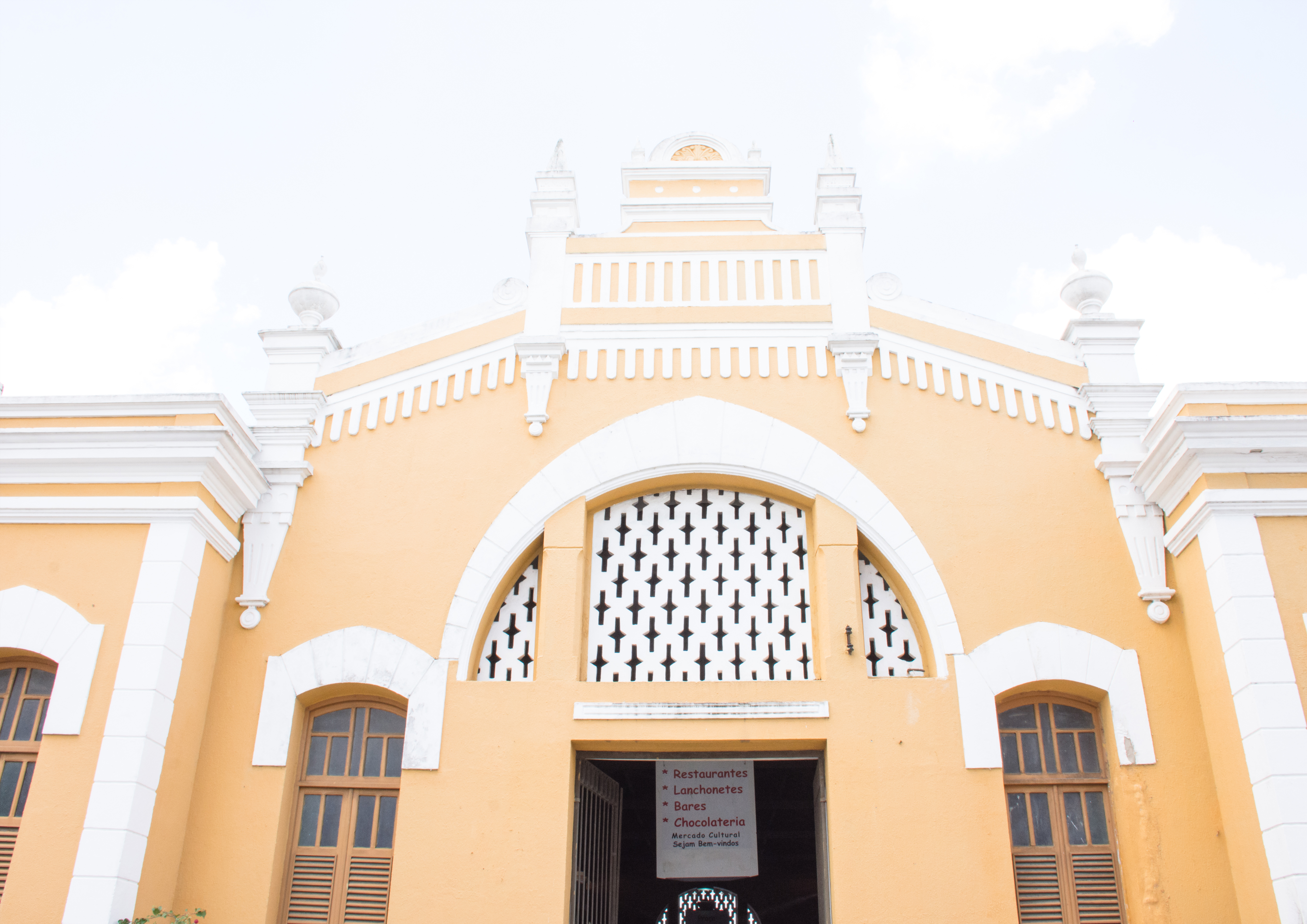
Cultural Market

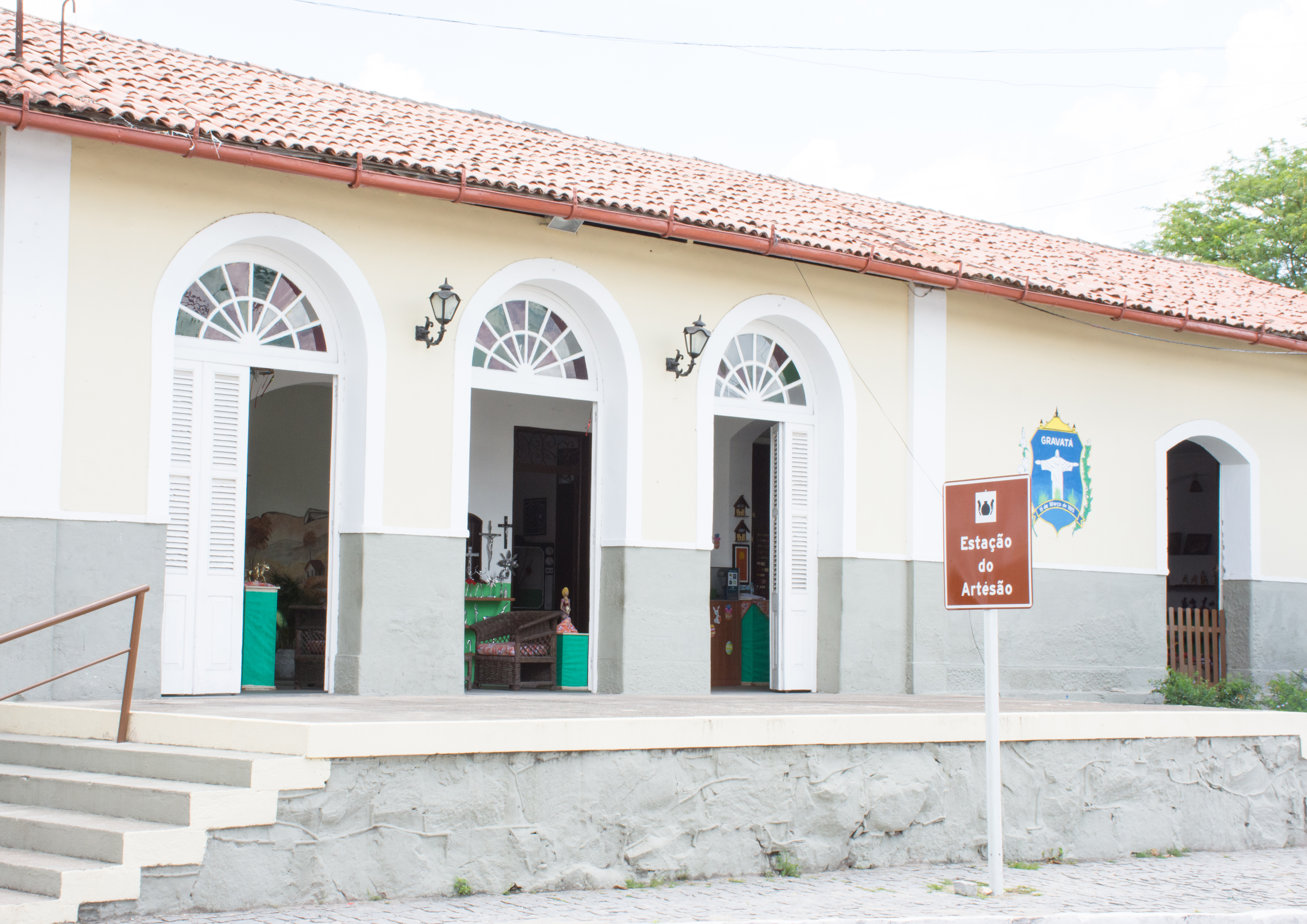
Craftsman Station

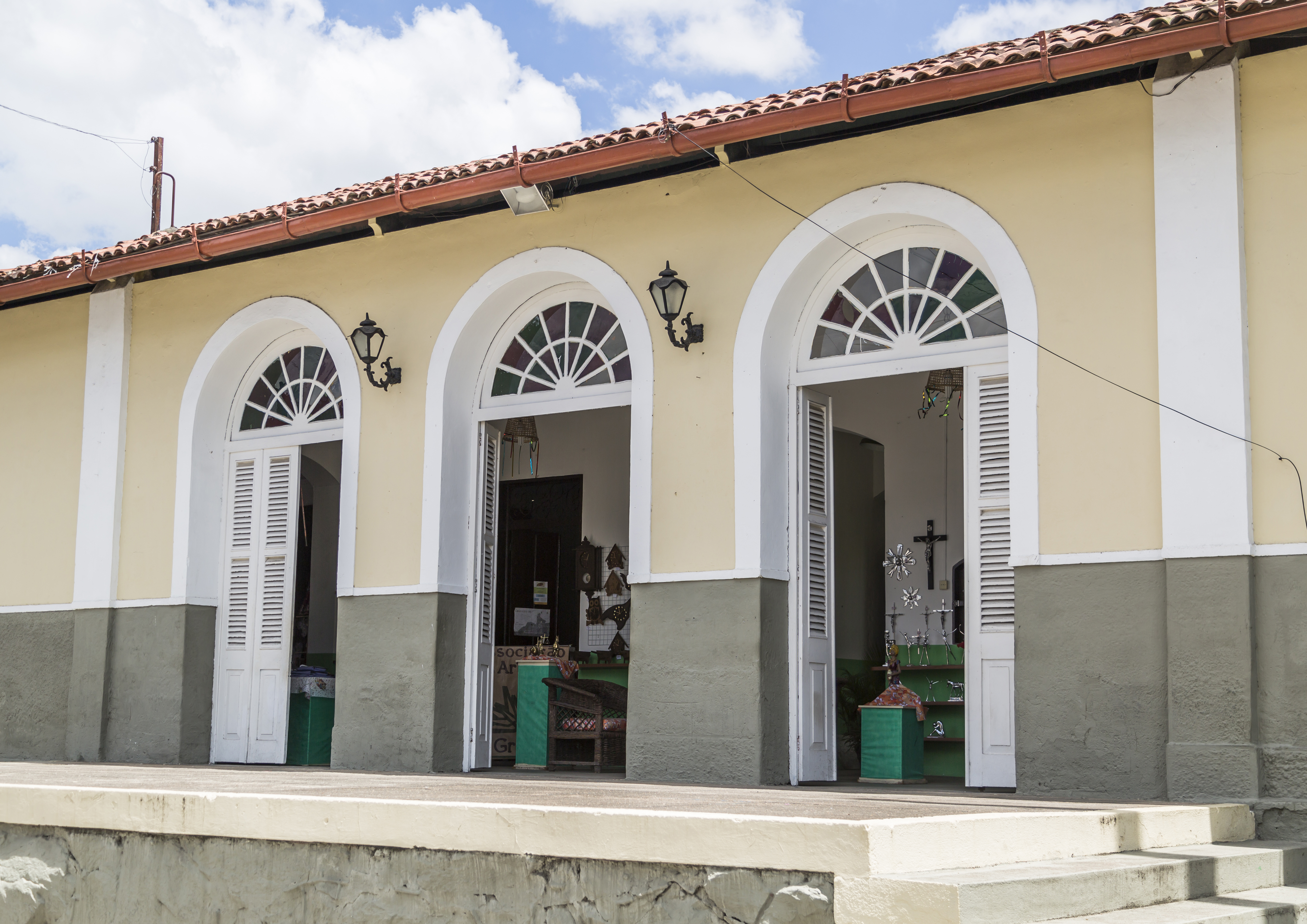
Craftsman Station

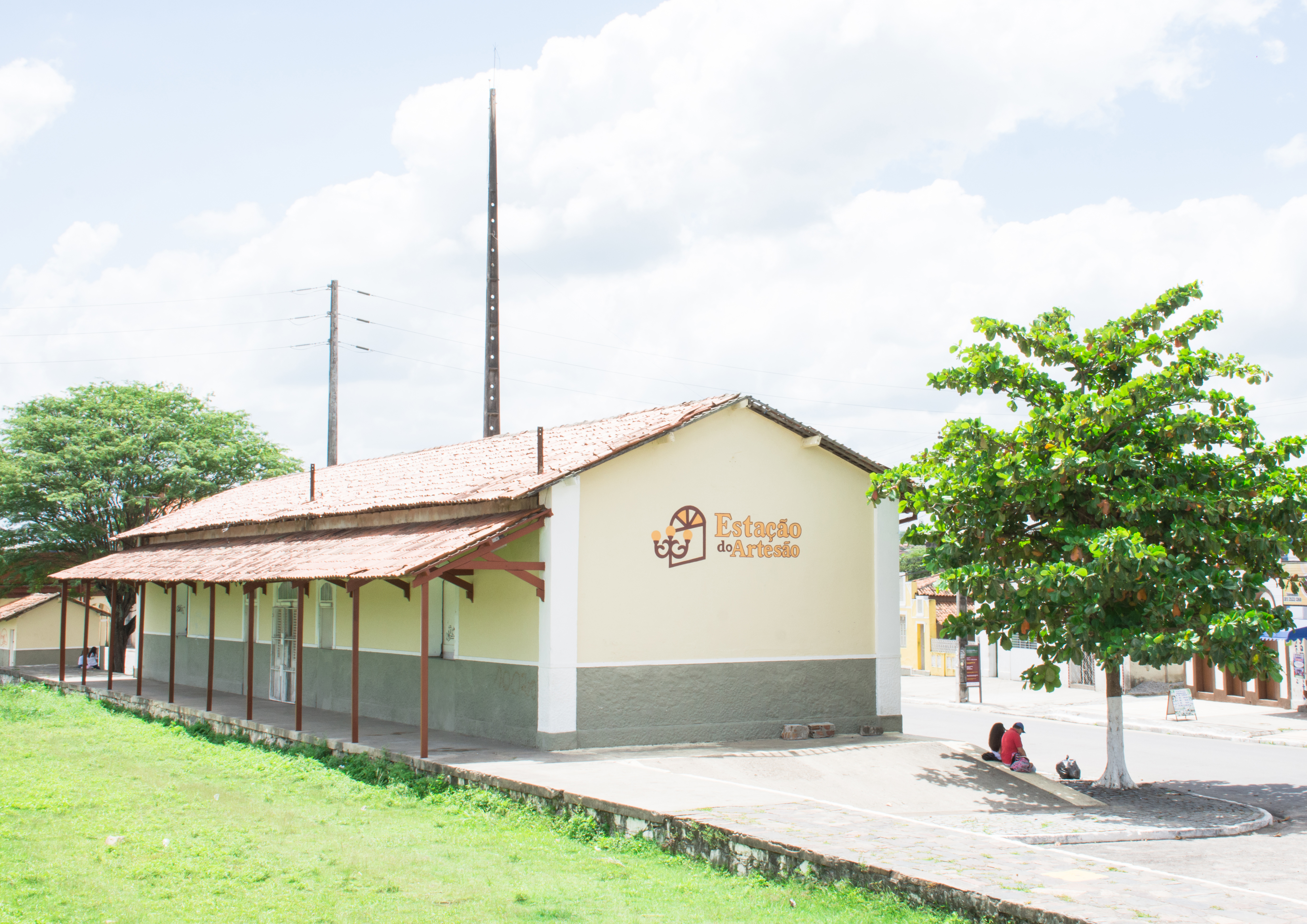
Craftsman Station

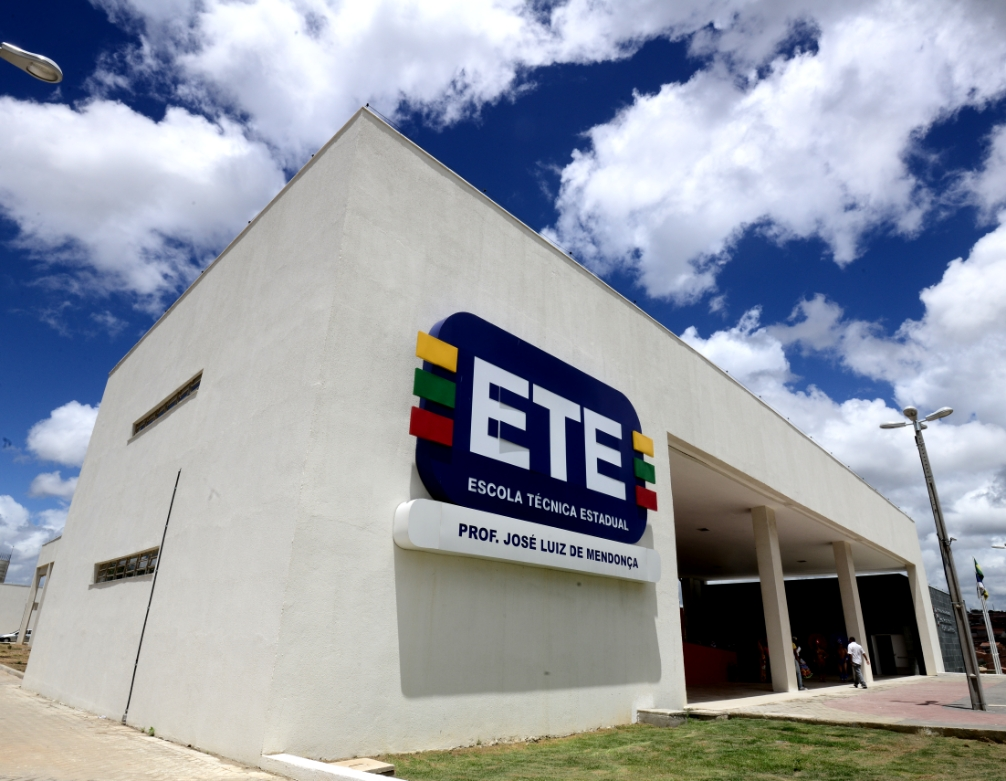
State Technical School Professor José Luiz de Mendonça

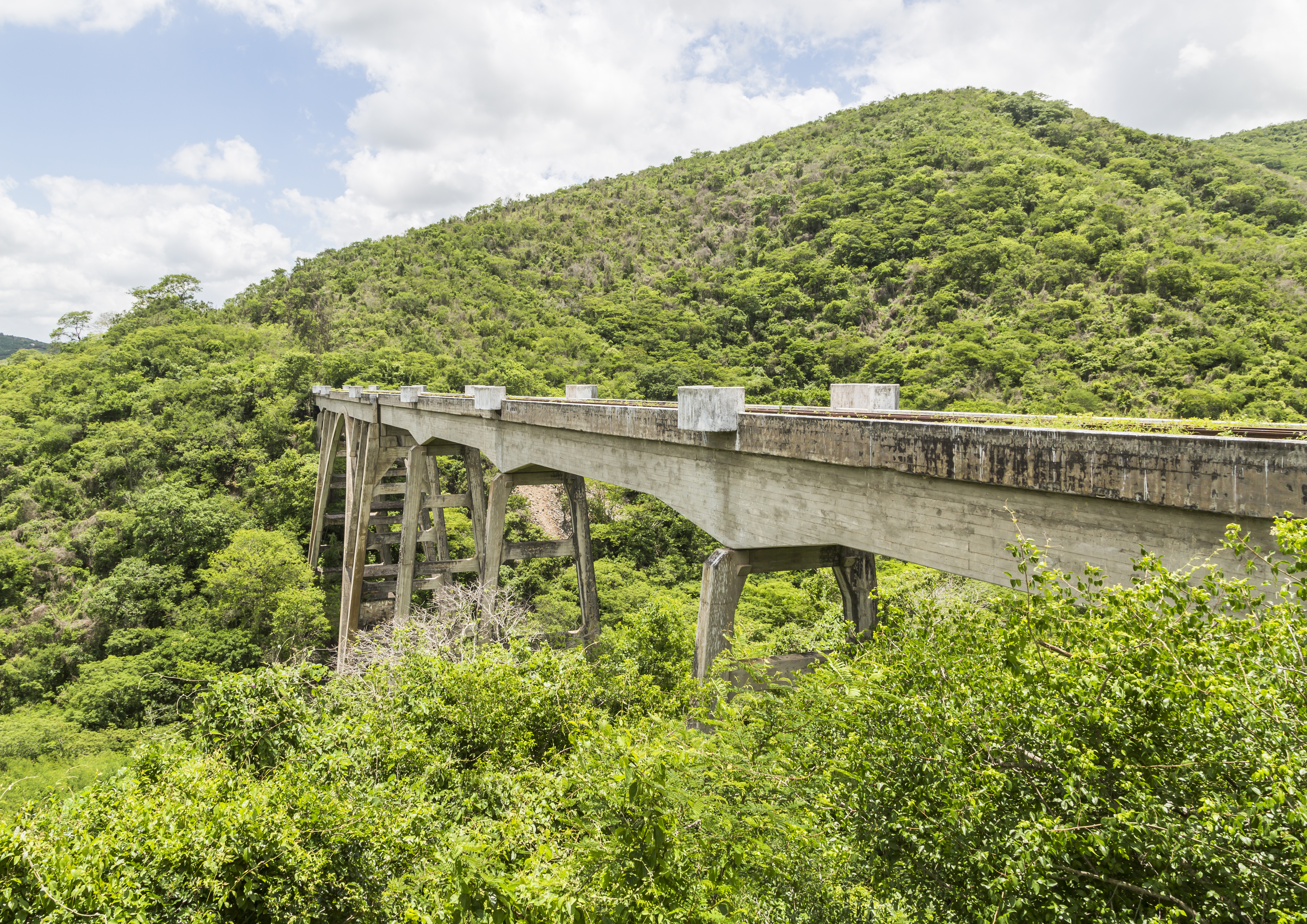
Cascavel railway bridge

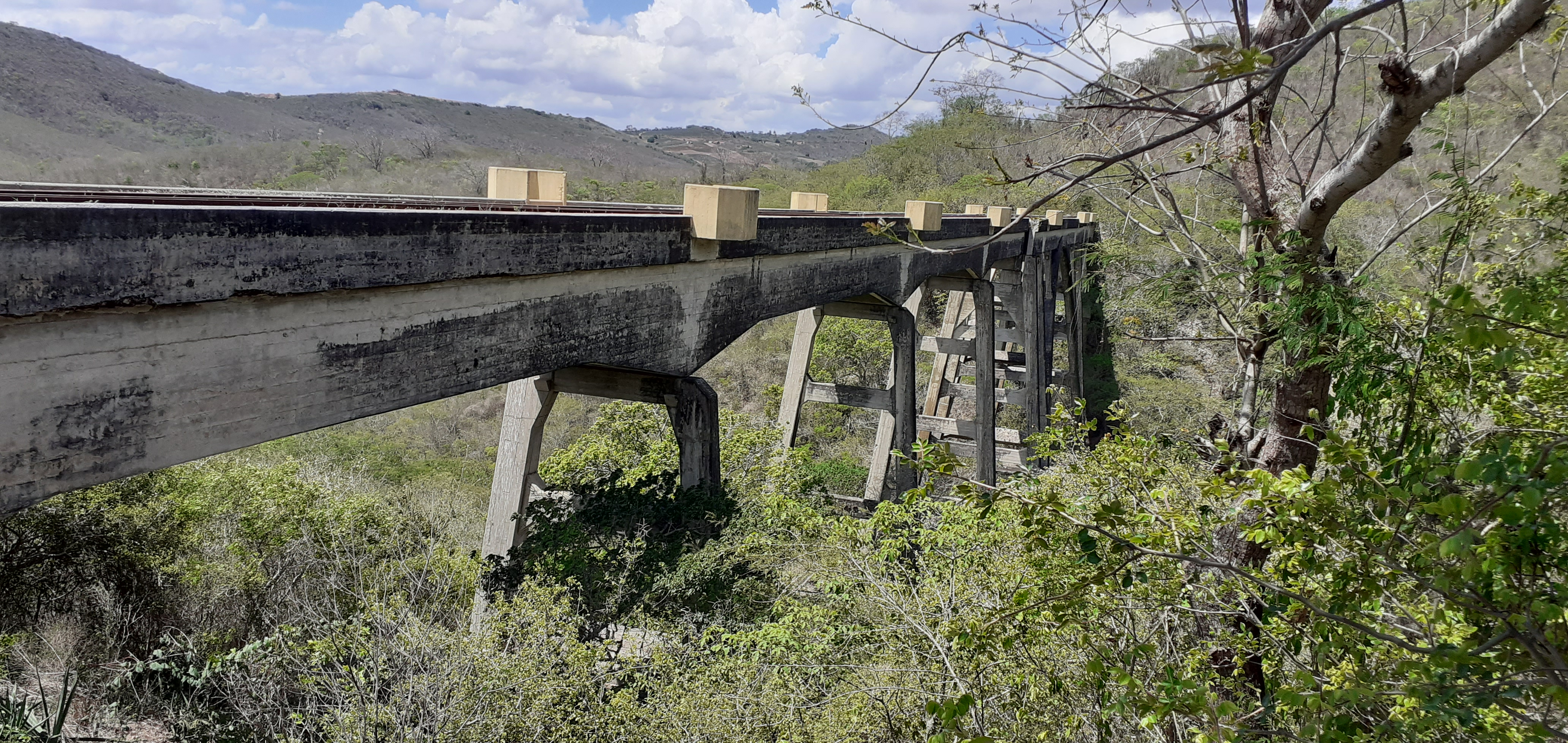
Cascavel railway bridge

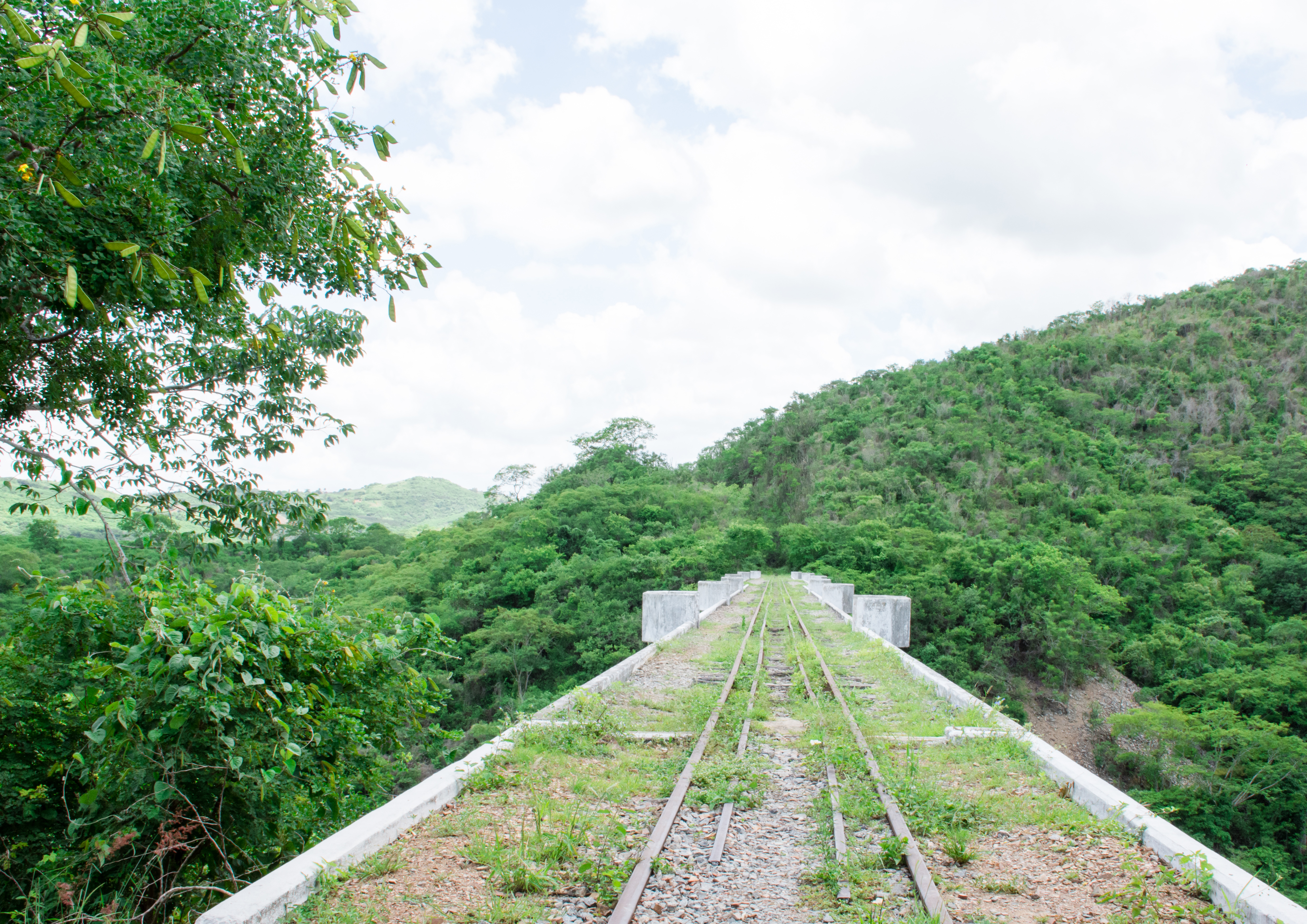
Cascavel railway bridge

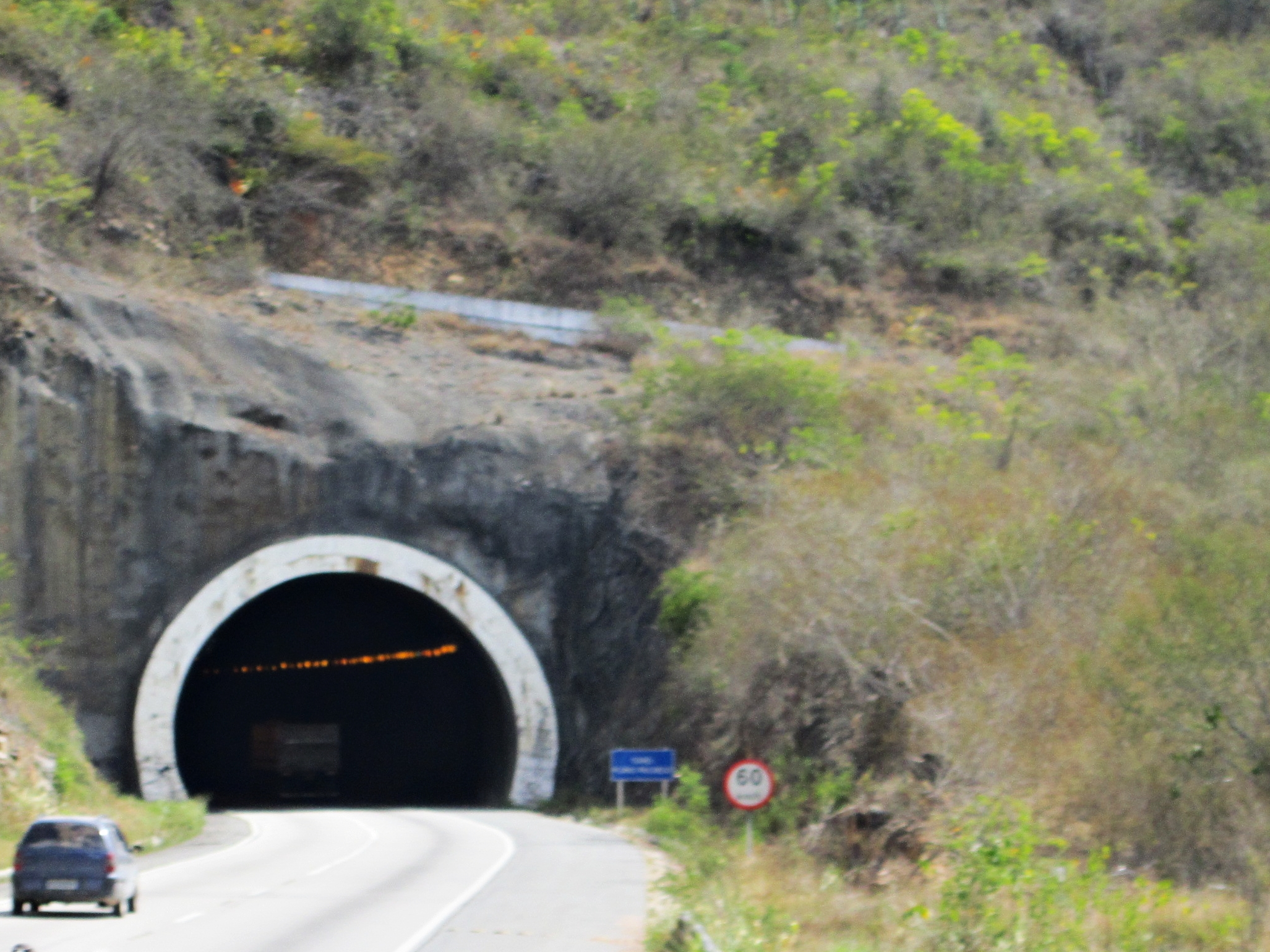
Plinio Pacheco Tunnel

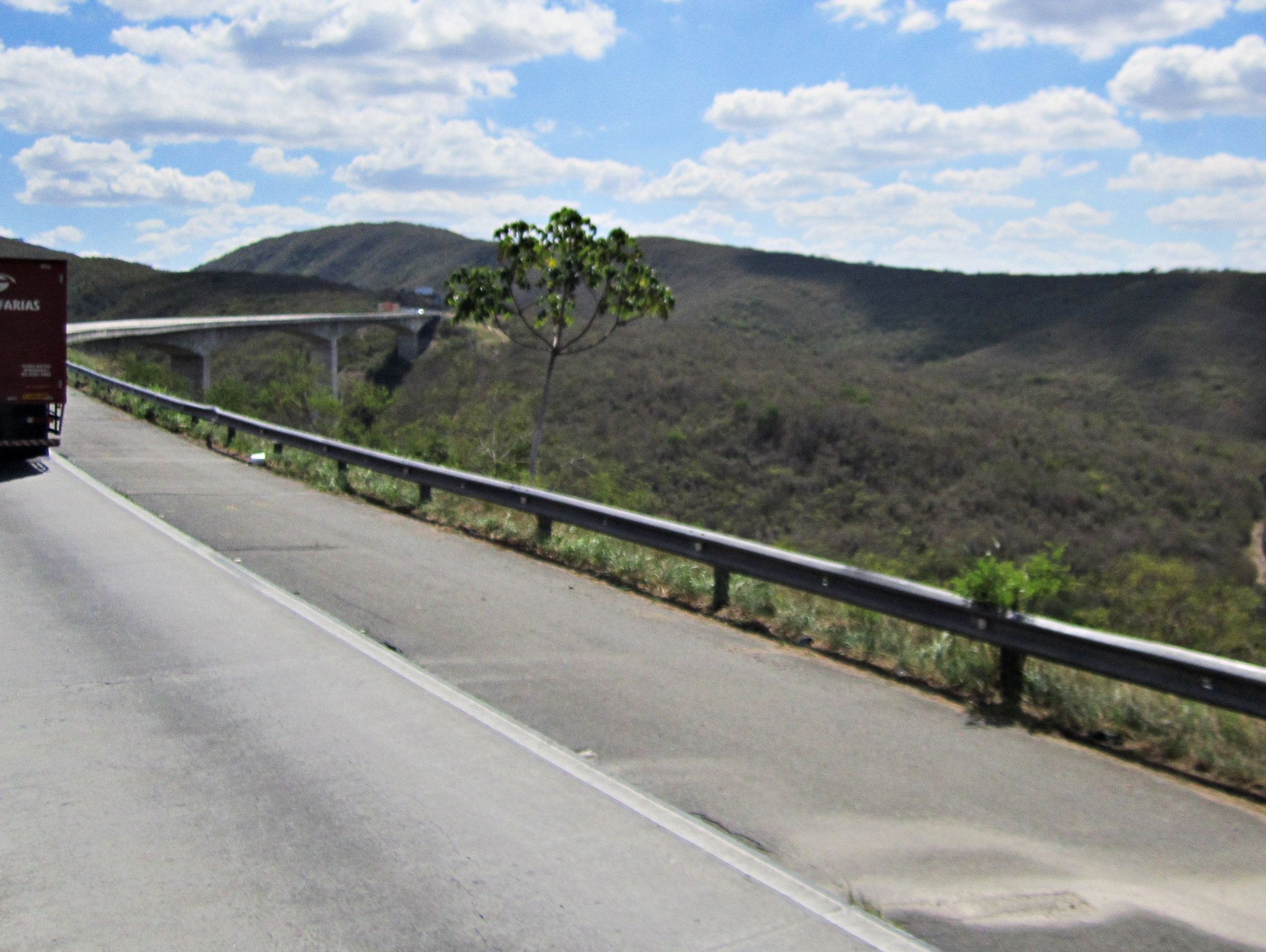
Cascavel Bridge

== See also ==
- List of municipalities in Pernambuco
