= São Joaquim do Monte =

City in Pernambuco, Brazil

- Municipality
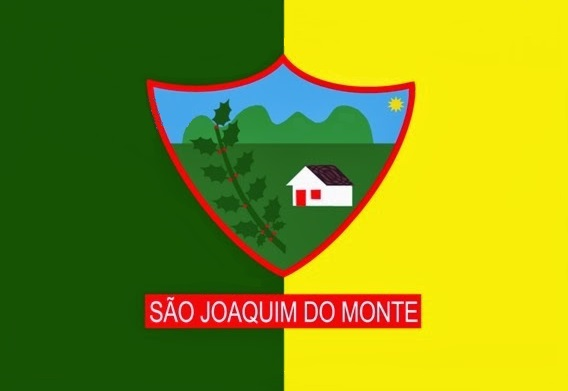
- Flag
- Etymology: In English "Saint Joaquim of Monte", named after Colonel Joaquim José de Lima and the nearby mountain range Serra do Monte
- Location of São Joaquim do Monte in Pernambuco

- Location within Brazil Location within South America
- Coordinates: 8°26′0″S 35°48′35″W
- Country: Brazil
- Region: Northeast
- State: Pernambuco
- Founded: 11 September 1928

Government
  - Mayor: Eduardo José de Oliveira Lins (PSDB) (2025-2028)
  - Vice Mayor: Gutenberg Coelho Coutinho de Araujo (PL) (2025-2028)

Area
  - Total: 227.385 km^{2} (87.794 sq mi)
- Elevation: 463 m (1,519 ft)

Population (2022 Census)
  - Total: 20,037
  - Estimate (2025): 20,438
  - Density: 88.12/km^{2} (228.2/sq mi)
- Demonym: São-joaquinense (Brazilian Portuguese)
- Time zone: UTC-03:00 (Brasília Time)
- Postal code: 55670-000, 55672-000, 55673-000, 55674-000
- HDI (2010): 0.537 – low
- Website: saojoaquimdomonte.pe.gov.br

São Joaquim do Monte (Central northeastern portuguese pronunciation: [ˈsɐ̃w ʒuɐˈkĩ ˈdu ˈmõti]) is a city located in the state of Pernambuco, Brazil. Located 124.6 km away from Recife, capital of the state of Pernambuco, it has an estimated (2022 Census) population of 20,037 inhabitants.

== Geography ==
- State - Pernambuco
- Region - Agreste Pernambucano
- Boundaries - Bezerros and Camocim de São Félix (N); Cupira (S); Bonito and Belém de Maria (E); Agrestina (W).
- Area - 242.63 km^{2}
- Elevation - 463 m
- Hydrography - Sirinhaém and Una rivers
- Vegetation - Caatinga hipoxerófila
- Climate - Hot and humid
- Annual average temperature - 22.7 c
- Distance to Recife - 124.6 km

== Economy ==
The main economic activities in São Joaquim do Monte are based in commerce and agribusiness, especially tomatoes, manioc, passion fruits; and livestock such as cattle, pigs and poultry.

=== Economic indicators ===
Population	GDP x(1000 R$).	GDP pc (R$)	PE
21.872	65.415	3.135	0.105%

Economy by Sector 2006

Primary sector	Secondary sector	Service sector
15.75%	8.89%	75.36%

=== Health indicators ===
HDI (2000)	Hospitals (2007)	Hospitals beds (2007)	Children's Mortality every 1000 (2005)
0.571	1	46	27.8

== See also ==
- List of municipalities in Pernambuco
