= Belém de Maria =

City in Pernambuco, Brazil

Belém de Maria Bethlehem of Mariah
- City
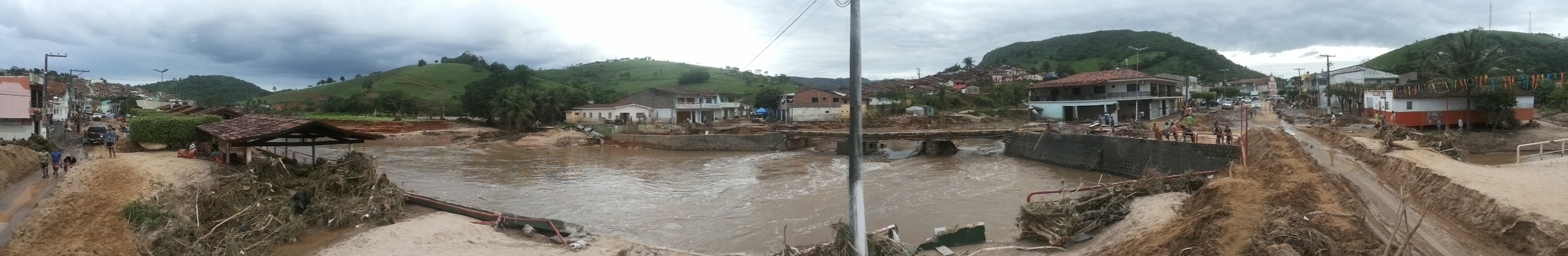

- Flag Coat of arms

- Location within Brazil
- Coordinates: 8°37′S 35°51′W
- Country: Brazil
- State: Pernambuco
- Elevation: 227 m (745 ft)

Population (2022 Census)
  - Total: 10,378
  - Estimate (2025): 10.798

Belém de Maria (Central northeastern portuguese pronunciation: [bɛˈlẽj di mɐˈɾjɐ]) (Bethlehem of Mariah) is a city located in the state of Pernambuco, Brazil. Located at 150 km away from Recife, capital of the state of Pernambuco, Belém de Maria has an estimated (IBGE 2025) population of 10,798 inhabitants.

== Geography ==
- State - Pernambuco
- Region - Zona da mata Pernambucana
- Boundaries - Bonito (N); Catende (S and E); Lagoa dos Gatos, Cupira and São Joaquim do Monte (W)
- Area - 69.47 km^{2}
- Elevation - 227 m
- Hydrography - Una River
- Vegetation - Subperenifólia forest
- Clima - Hot tropical and humid
- Annual average temperature - 22.0 c
- Distance to Recife - 150 km

== Economy ==
The main economic activities in Belém de Maria are based in agribusiness, especially sugarcane, bananas, manioc; and livestock such as cattle.

=== Economic indicators ===
Population	GDP x(1000 R$).	GDP pc (R$)	PE
9.703	30.351	3.145	0.05%

Economy by Sector 2006

Primary sector	Secondary sector	Service sector
10.79%	8.64%	80.57%

=== Health indicators ===
HDI (2000)	Hospitals (2007)	Hospitals beds (2007)	Children's Mortality every 1000 (2005)
0.590	1	15	17.1

== See also ==
- List of municipalities in Pernambuco
