= Bezerros =

Municipality in Pernambuco, Brazil

- Municipality
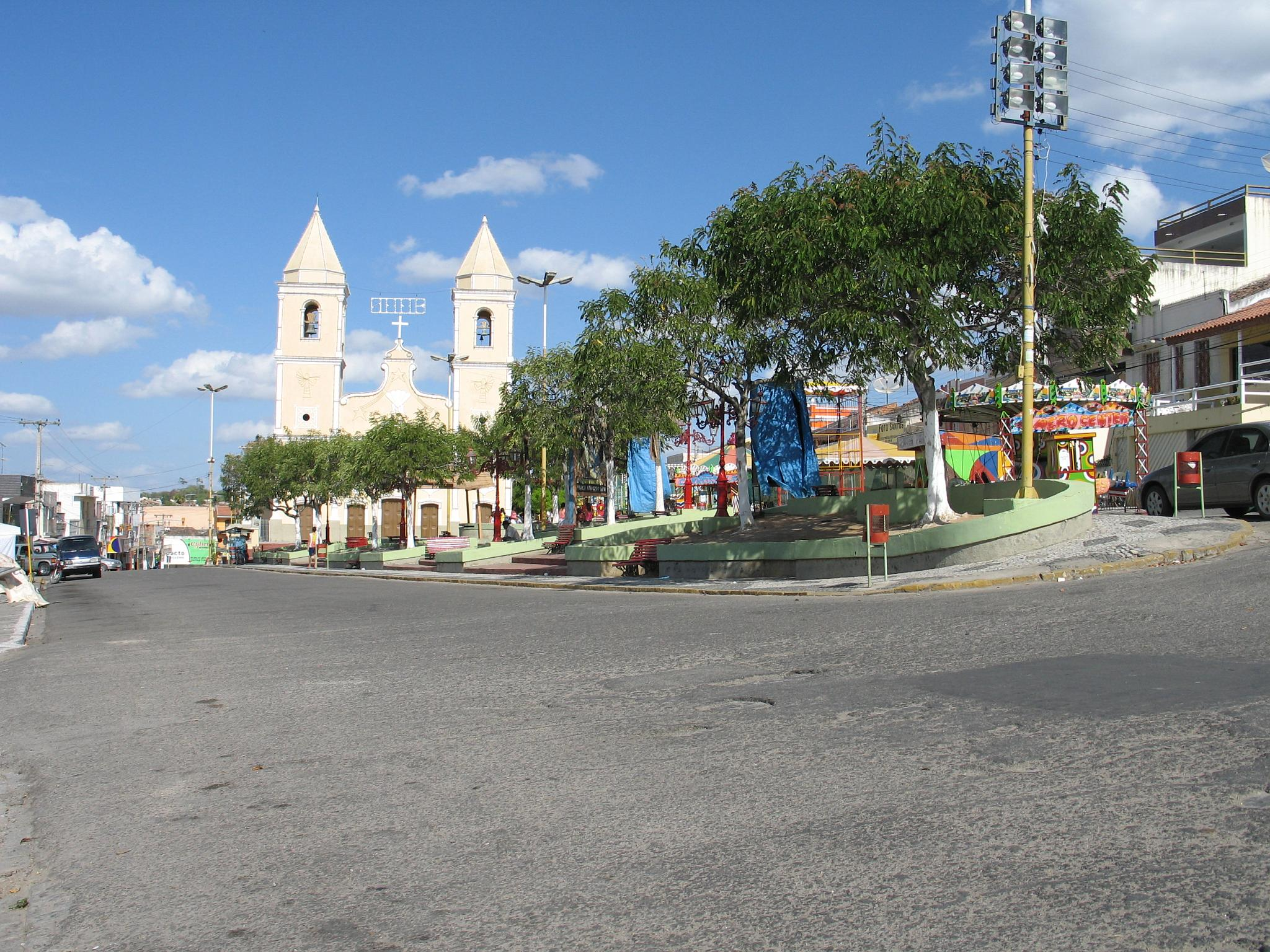
- View of Bezerros

- Flag Coat of arms

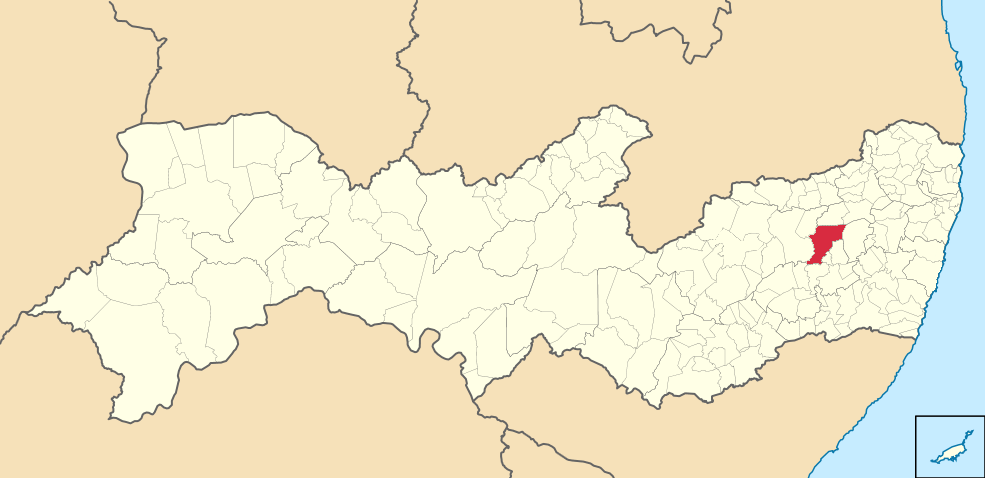
- Location in Pernambuco state

- Location in Brazil
- Coordinates: 8°14′7″S 35°45′10″W
- Country: Brazil
- Region: Northeast
- State: Pernambuco

Area
  - Total: 491 km^{2} (190 sq mi)

Population (2025)
  - Total: 65,007
  - Density: 132/km^{2} (343/sq mi)
- Time zone: UTC−3 (BRT)

Bezerros (Portuguese pronunciation: [biˈzeʁus]) is a municipality in northeastern Brazil, in the State of Pernambuco, near the city of Gravatá. Its population estimate was 65.007 (2025) and its area is 497,156 km^{2}. Also known as Papangu city, because a festive tradition in which the people dress masks of all types during the Carnival festivities. During the carnival time, it is one of the most visited cities in the interior of the state. Also, it was a center of coffee production, an activity which is no longer important in the region. It is much visited during Carnival; tourists and locals love to see papangus parading in city streets.

== Geography ==
- State - Pernambuco
- Region - Agreste of Pernambuco
- Boundaries - Cumaru and Passira (N); Agrestina and São Joaquim do Monte (S); Caruaru and Riacho das Almas (W); Gravatá, Camocim de São Félix and Sairé (E)
- Area - 490.8 km^{2}
- Elevation - 470 m
- Hydrography - Capibaribe, Ipojuca and Una rivers
- Climate - Hot tropical and humid
- Main road - BR 232
- Distance to Recife - 100 km

== Tourist attractions ==
- Serra Negra
- Igreja de São Francisco Xavier, Serra Negra, Bezerros, Pernambuco, Brasil
- Sítio Pedra Solta, camping area, planning on visiting jungle areas: here is the place, rappel
- Lula Vassoureiro's Atelier
- Centro de Artesanato de Pernambuco - Handicraft center
- J. Borges' atelier, a great woodcut artist and one of the greatest Cordel makers of Brazil.
- J. Miguel' atelier, a great woodcut artist and also a Cordel maker.
- Papangu Carnival

== Economy ==
The main activities based in Bezerros are tourism, commerce and agribusiness. Especially, plantations of tomatoes and creations of cattle'

=== Economic Indicators ===
| Population | GDP x(1000 R$). | GDP pc (R$) | PE |
|---|---|---|---|
| 58.354 | 232.859 | 4.112 | 0.38% |

Economy by Sector 2006

| Primary sector | Secondary sector | Service sector |
|---|---|---|
| 6.22% | 16.30% | 77.48% |

=== Health Indicators ===
| HDI (2000) | Hospitals (2007) | Hospitals beds (2007) | Children's Mortality every 1000 (2005) |
|---|---|---|---|
| 0.619 | 2 | 170 | 17.9 |
