= Lagoa dos Gatos =

Municipality of Pernambuco, Brazil

- Municipality
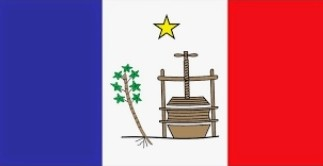
- Flag

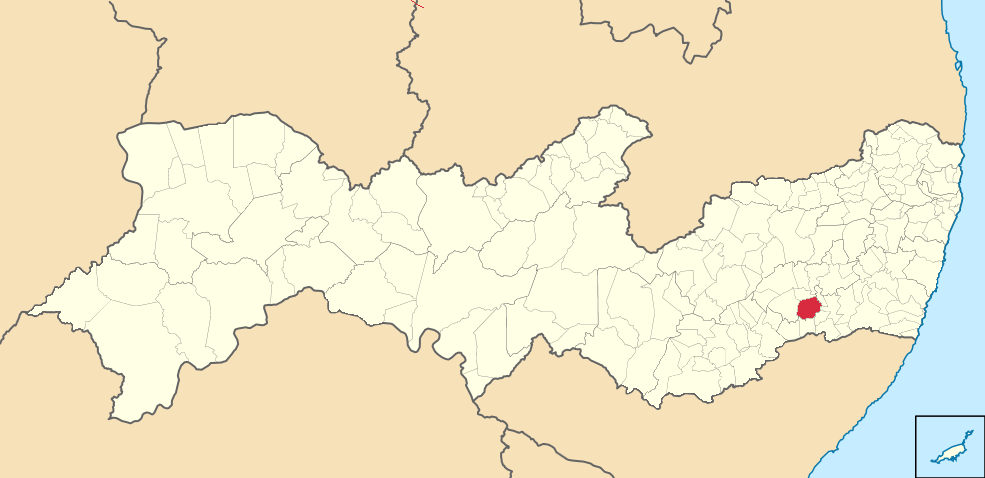
- Location in Pernambuco state

- Location in Brazil
- Coordinates: 8°39′28″S 35°54′00″W
- Country: Brazil
- Region: Northeast
- State: Pernambuco

Area
  - Total: 233.16 km^{2} (90.02 sq mi)
- Elevation: 464 m (1,522 ft)

Population (2022 Census)
  - Total: 14,076
  - Estimate (2025): 14,333
  - Density: 60.371/km^{2} (156.36/sq mi)
- Time zone: UTC−3 (BRT)

Lagoa dos Gatos (Central northeastern portuguese pronunciation: [laˈɡoɐ ˈduɦ ˈɡatu]) is a municipality in the state of Pernambuco, Brazil.

== History ==
Portuguese explorers first reached the place in the late 18th century, and it is presumed that José Cavalcanti Fragoso was the one to establish the settlement of Peri-Peri, which would later become the town. Lagoa dos Gatos was officially recognised as a populational gathering in 1832 and became a village in 1839. In 1928 it was renamed Frei Caneca, until 1938, when it reverted to its original name.

Local legends state that the name, which literally means "Cat's Lagoon", was used by its first explorers after sighting a few margays at a small lagoon.

In 1832 the mountainous surroundings of Lagoa dos Gatos played an important role at the "Guerra dos Cabanos" (War of Cabanos), one of the many uprisings in Brasil's first years of independence.

== Geography ==
- State - Pernambuco
- Region - Agreste Pernambucano
- Boundaries - Cupira (N); São Benedito do Sul (S); Panelas (W); Belém de Maria and Jaqueira (E)
- Area - 233.16 km^{2}
- Elevation - 464 m
- Hydrography - Una river
- Vegetation - Subcaducifólia forest
- Climate - tropical hot and humid
- Annual average temperature - 24.0 c
- Distance to Recife - 159 km

== Economy ==
The main economic activities in Lagoa dos Gatos are based in agribusiness, especially manioc, sugarcane and creation of cattle and goats.

=== Economic Indicators ===
Population	GDP x(1000 R$).	GDP pc (R$)	PE
16,567	45.791	2.868	0.076%

Economy by Sector 2006

Primary sector	Secondary sector	Service sector
7.91%	9.27%	82.82%

=== Health Indicators ===
HDI (2000)	Hospitals (2007)	Hospitals beds (2007)	Children's Mortality every 1000 (2005)
0.536	1	11	33.5

== See also ==
- List of municipalities in Pernambuco
