= Camocim de São Félix =

City in Pernambuco, Brazil

- Municipality of Pernambuco, Brazil
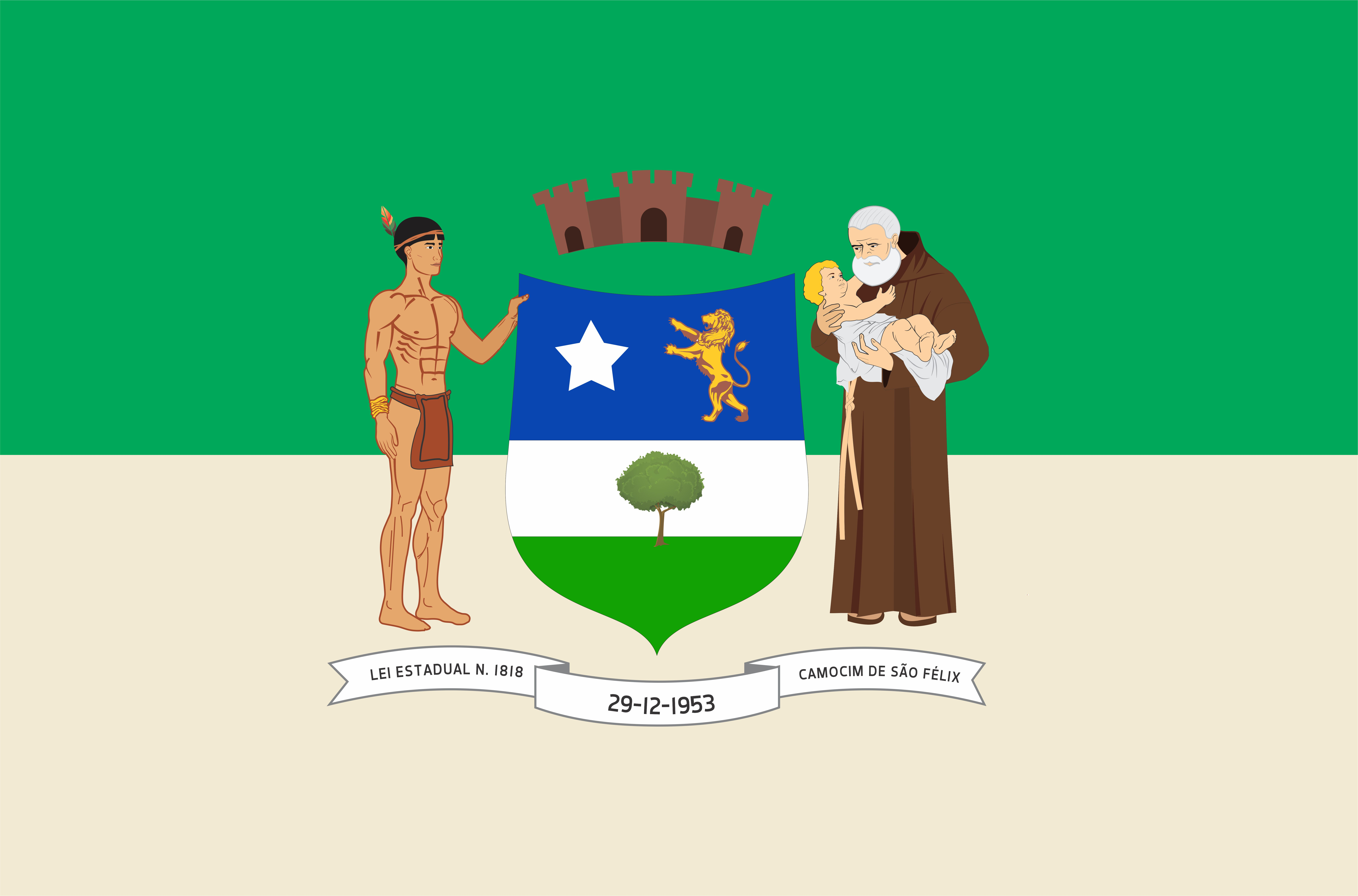
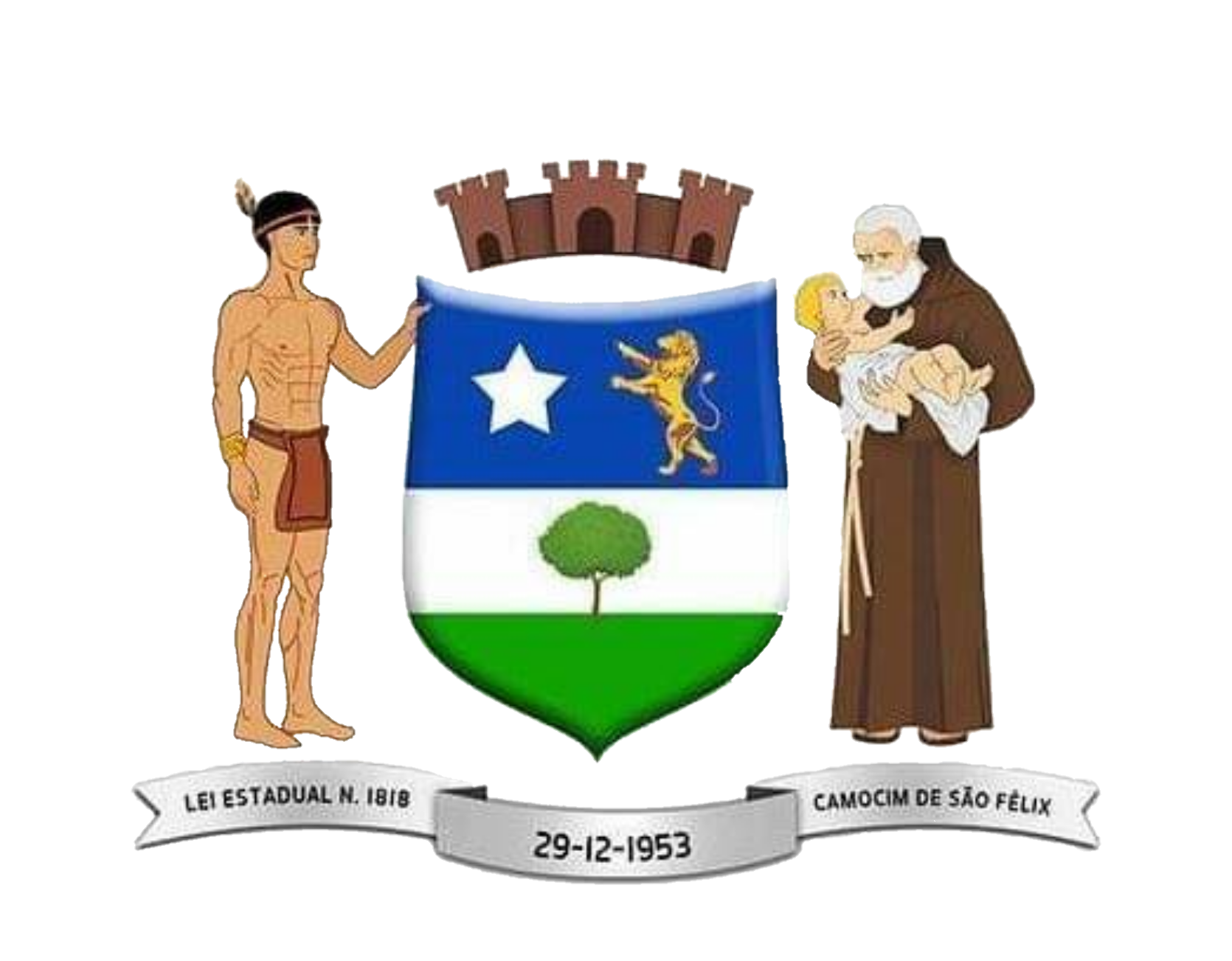
- Flag Coat of arms
- Etymology: "Camocim" originates from the Tupi word kamu’si, meaning pot, vase, or funerary urn, and "São Félix" from Felix of Cantalice
- Location in the state of Pernambuco

- Location within Brazil Location within South America
- Coordinates: 8°21′S 35°46′W
- Country: Brazil
- Region: Northeast
- State: Pernambuco
- Founded: 29 December 1953

Government
  - Mayor: Sostenes Rubano Neves Pontes (PSD) (2025-2028)
  - Vice Mayor: Rivaldo Luiz Pereira do Carmo (PSDB) (2025-2028)

Area
  - Total: 72.01 km^{2} (27.80 sq mi)
- Elevation: 646 m (2,119 ft)

Population (2022 Census)
  - Total: 17,419
  - Estimate (2025): 18,018
  - Density: 241.9/km^{2} (627/sq mi)
- Demonym: Camociense or Camocinense (Brazilian Portuguese)
- Time zone: UTC-03:00 (Brasília Time)
- Postal code: 55665-000
- HDI (2010): 0.588 – medium
- Website: camocimdesaofelix.pe.gov.br

Camocim de São Félix (Central northeastern portuguese pronunciation: [kamuˈsĩ ˈdi ˈsɐ̃w ˈfɛlik͡s]) is a city located in the state of Pernambuco, Brazil. It is located 113.7 km away from Recife, the capital of Pernambuco. As of 2022, it has an estimated (2022 Census) population of 17,419 inhabitants.

== Geography ==
- State - Pernambuco
- Region - Agreste Meridional Pernambucano
- Boundaries - Sairé (N and E); Bonito and São Joaquim do Monte (S); Bezerros (W)
- Area - 53.58 km^{2}
- Elevation - 691 m
- Hydrography - Sirinhaém and Una rivers
- Vegetation - Subcaducifólia forest
- Clima - hot and humid
- Annual average temperature - 21.2 c
- Distance to Recife - 113.7 km

== Economy ==
The main economic activities in Camocim de São Félix are based in agribusiness, especially tomatoes, passion fruits; and livestock such as cattle, chickens and quails.

=== Economic indicators ===
| Population | GDP x(1000 R$). | GDP pc (R$) | PE |
|---|---|---|---|
| 16.574 | 56.239 | 3.552 | 0.09% |

Economy by Sector 2006

| Primary sector | Secondary sector | Service sector |
|---|---|---|
| 16.40% | 9.12% | 74.48% |

=== Health indicators ===
| HDI (2000) | Hospitals (2007) | Hospitals beds (2007) | Children's Mortality every 1000 (2005) |
|---|---|---|---|
| 0.626 | 1 | 14 | 44.7 |

== See also ==
- List of municipalities in Pernambuco
