= Agrestina =

Municipality of Pernambuco, Brazil

- City
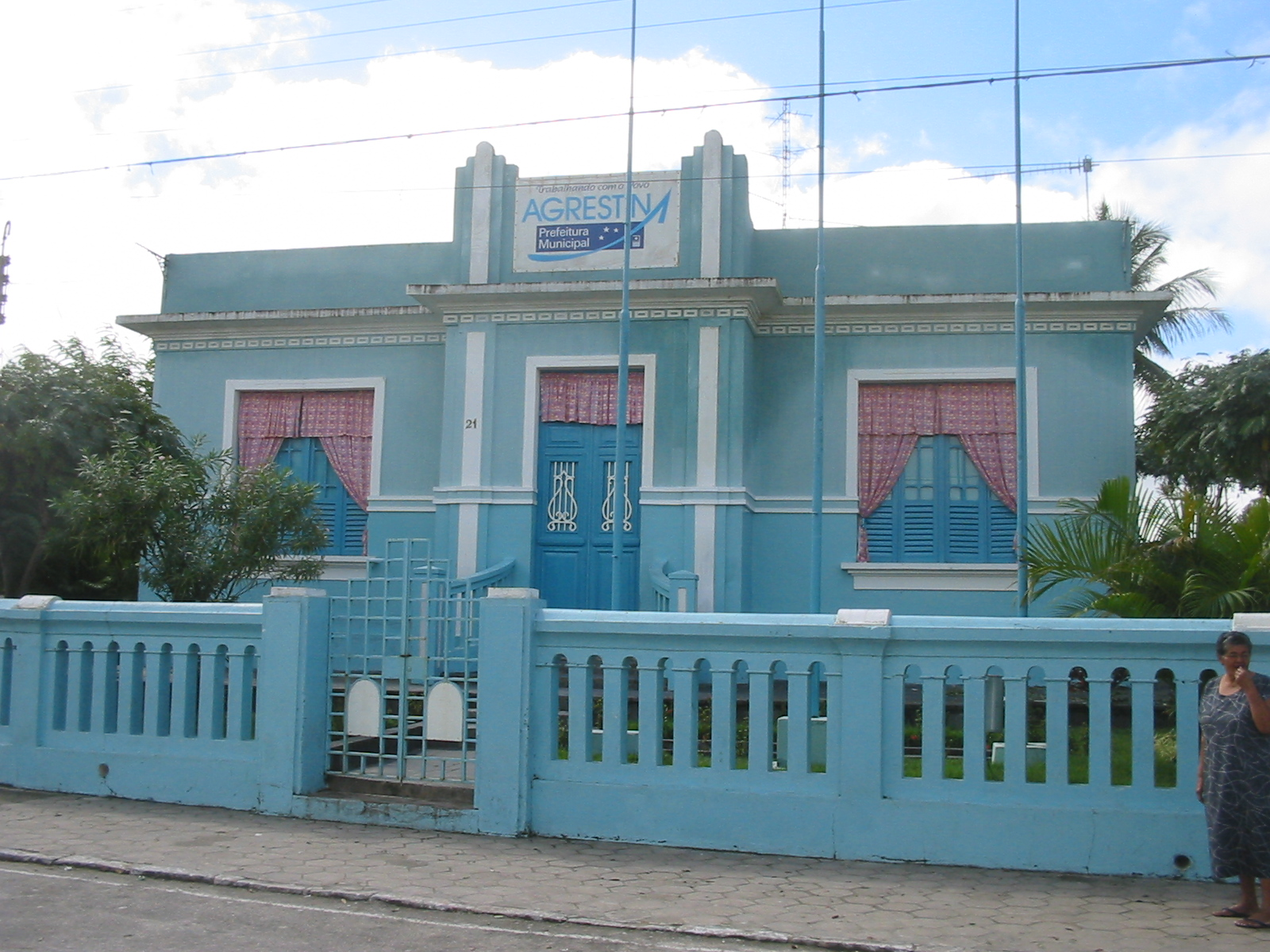
- City Hall of Agrestina

- Flag Coat of arms

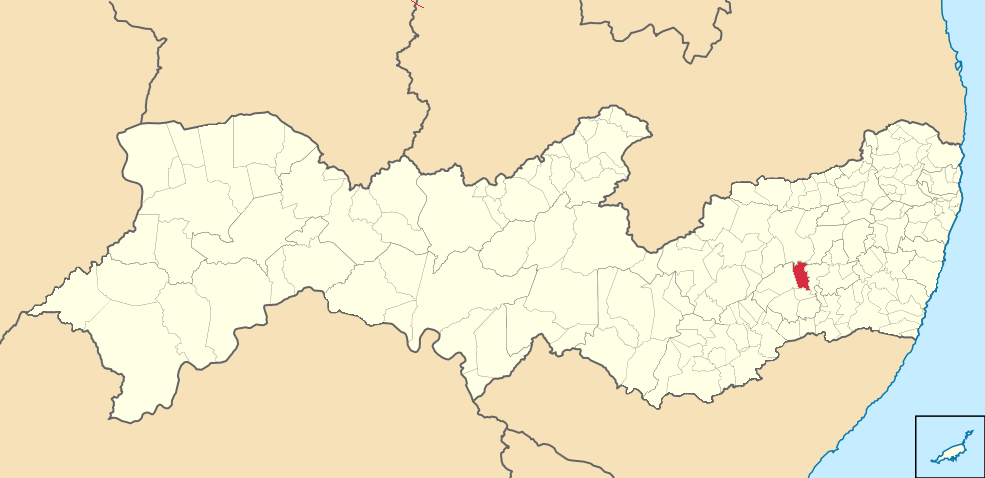
- Location of Agrestina in Pernambuco

- Location of Agrestina in Brazil
- Coordinates: 8°27′S 35°57′W
- Country: Brazil
- State: Pernambuco
- Region: Agreste

Government
  - Mayor: Thiago Nunes (PDT, 2013–2016)

Area
  - Total: 200.58 km^{2} (77.44 sq mi)
- Elevation: 427 m (1,401 ft)

Population (2022 Census)
  - Total: 23,779
  - Estimate (2025): 24,680
  - Density: 118.55/km^{2} (307.05/sq mi)
- Demonym: Agrestinense
- Time zone: UTC−3 (BRT)
- Average Temperature: 23.4 C

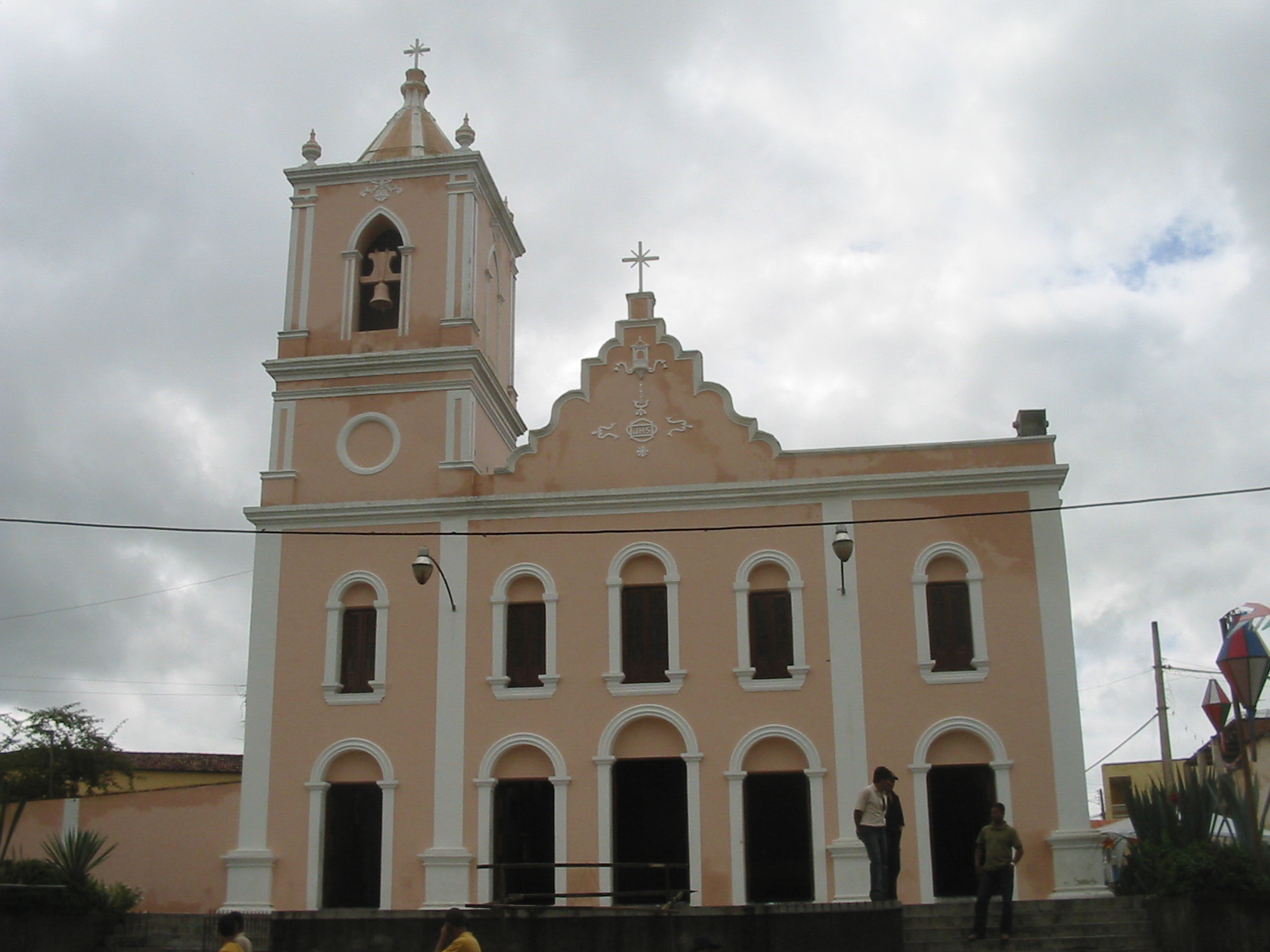
Main Church

Agrestina (Central northeastern portuguese pronunciation: [aɡɾɛʃˈtinɐ]) (Wilding) is a Brazilian municipality in the state of Pernambuco, mesoregion of Agreste. It covers 200.58 km^{2} (77.44 mi^{2}), and has a population of 25,065 with a population density of 113 inhabitants per square kilometer.

== Geography ==
- State - Pernambuco
- Region - Agreste of Pernambuco
- Boundaries - Caruaru and Bezerros (N); Cupira (S); São Joaquim do Monte (E); Altinho (W)
- Area - 200.58 km^{2} (77.44 mi^{2})
- Elevation - 427 kilometres (265 mi)
- Hydrography - Una River
- Vegetation - Hiperxerófila caatinga
- Climate - Transition between tropical (coastal) and semi arid
- Annual average temperature - 23.4 c
- Distance to Recife - 150 kilometres (93 mi)

== Economy ==
The main economic activities in Agrestina are based in general commerce, industry and agribusiness. Especially, manioc and, creations of cattle, goats and sheep.

=== Economic Indicators ===
Population	GDP x(1000 R$).	GDP pc (R$)	PE
22.591	85.752	3.997	0.14%

Economy by Sector 2006

Primary sector	Secondary sector	Service sector
19.29%	12.90%	67.81%

=== Health Indicators ===
HDI (2000)	Hospitals (2007)	Hospitals beds (2007)	Children's Mortality every 1000 (2005)
0.612	1	72	33.8

== History ==
Agrestina was founded in 1884 so Bebedouro, and became a district of Altinho in 1911. It became an independent municipality in 1928 under the name of Bebedouro, which was changed to Agrestina in 1943.

== See also ==
- List of municipalities in Pernambuco
