= Primavera, Pernambuco =

Municipality of Pernambuco State, Brazil

Primavera
- Municipality of Pernambuco, Brazil
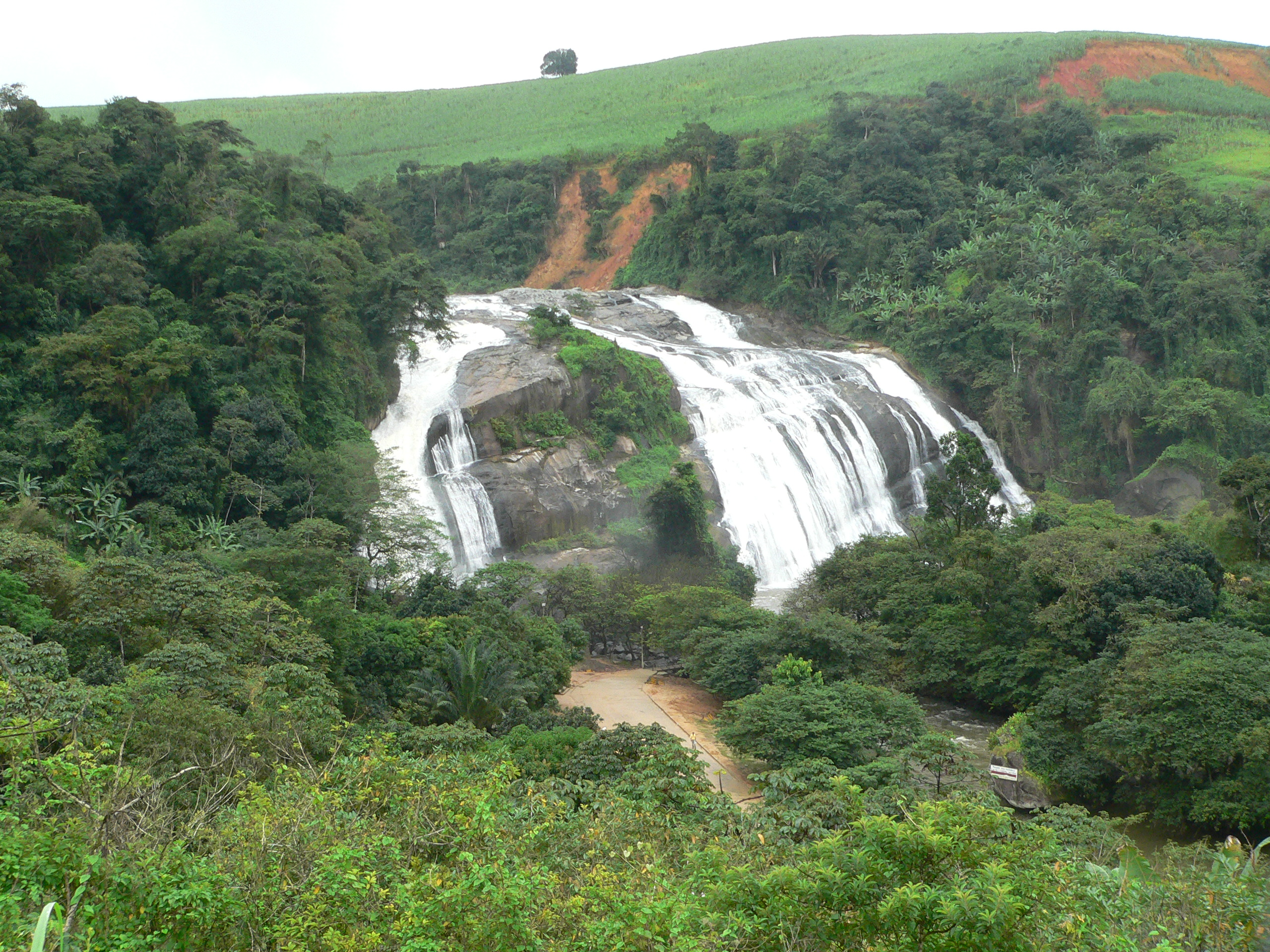
- Urubu Waterfall

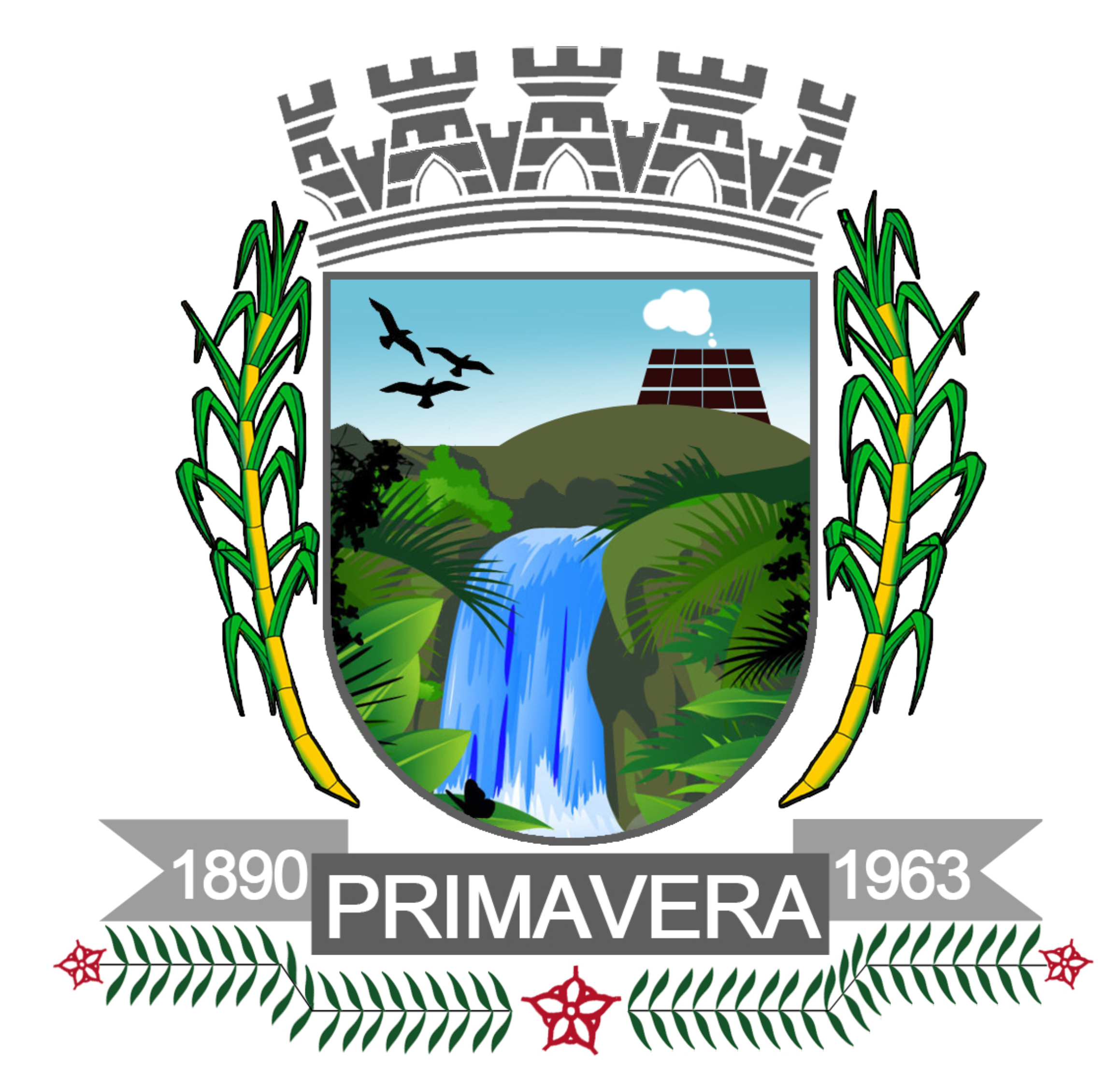
- Coat of arms

- Location of Primavera in Pernambuco

- Location within Brazil Location within South America
- Coordinates: 8°20′16″S 35°21′18″W
- Country: Brazil
- Region: Northeast
- State: Pernambuco
- Founded: 20 December 1963

Government
  - Mayor: Jeyson Cavalcanti de Almeida Falcão (PSB) (2025-2028)
  - Vice Mayor: João Victor Lima Pontual Ribeiro (Republicanos) (2025-2028)

Area
  - Total: 113.563 km^{2} (43.847 sq mi)
- Elevation: 129 m (423 ft)

Population (2022 Census)
  - Total: 13,838
  - Estimate (2025): 14,380
  - Density: 122.31/km^{2} (316.8/sq mi)
- Demonym: Primaverense (Brazilian Portuguese)
- Time zone: UTC-03:00 (Brasília Time)
- Postal code: 55510-000
- HDI (2010): 0.580 – medium
- Website: primavera.pe.gov.br

Primavera (Central northeastern portuguese pronunciation: [pɾimɐˈvɛɾɐ]) is a city located in the state of Pernambuco, Brazil. Located at 81.6 km away from Recife, capital of the state of Pernambuco. It has an estimated (IBGE 2020) population of 15,101 inhabitants. Its name means spring in Portuguese.

== Geography ==
- State – Pernambuco
- Region – Zona da mata Pernambucana
- Boundaries – Pombos and Chã Grande (N); Ribeirão (S); Escada and Vitória de Santo Antão (E); Amaraji (W)
- Area – 109.94 km^{2}
- Elevation – 129 m
- Hydrography – Sirinhaém and Ipojuca rivers
- Vegetation – Subcaducifólia forest
- Climate – Hot tropical and humid
- Annual average temperature – 24.7°C
- Distance to Recife – 81.6 km

== Economy ==
The main economic activities in Primavera are largely dominated by the food & beverage industry (81%) and agribusiness, especially sugarcane, passion fruits and cattle.

=== Economic indicators ===
Population	GDP x(1000 R$).	GDP pc (R$)	PE
12.364	61.395	5.180	0.10%

Economy by Sector 2006

Primary sector	Secondary sector	Service sector
19.02%	33.16%	47.82%

=== Health indicators ===
HDI (2000)	Hospitals (2007)	Hospitals beds (2007)	Children's Mortality every 1000 (2005)
0.632	1	4	14.0

== See also ==
- List of municipalities in Pernambuco
