= Amaraji =

Municipality of Pernambuco, Brazil

- City
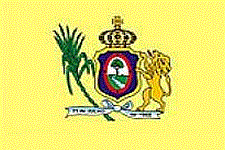
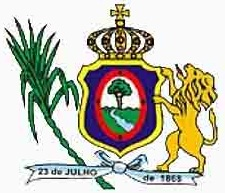
- Flag Coat of arms

- Location within Brazil
- Coordinates: 8°24′0″S 35°27′0″W
- Country: Brazil
- State: Pernambuco

Area
  - Total: 234.78 km^{2} (90.65 sq mi)
- Elevation: 289 m (948 ft)

Population (2022 Census)
  - Total: 18,205
  - Estimate (2025): 18,335
- Time zone: UTC−3 (BRT)

Amaraji (Central northeastern portuguese pronunciation: [ɐmɐɾɐˈʒi]) is a city located in the state of Pernambuco, Brazil. It has an estimated (IBGE 2025) population of 18,335 inhabitants.

== Geography ==
- State - Pernambuco
- Region - Zona da mata Pernambucana
- Boundaries - Chã Grande (N); Ribeirão (S); Primavera (E); Gravatá and Cortês (W)
- Area - 234.78 km^{2}
- Elevation - 289m
- Hydrography - Sirinhaém and Ipojuca rivers
- Vegetation - Subcaducifólia forest
- Climate - Hot tropical and humid
- Annual average temperature - 24.0 c
- Distance to Recife - 101.6 km

== Economy ==
The main economic activities in Amaraji are based in food & beverage industry and agribusiness, especially sugarcane, bananas, manioc; and livestock such as cattle and poultry.

=== Economic indicators ===
| Population | GDP x(1000 R$). | GDP pc (R$) | PE |
|---|---|---|---|
| 20,509 | 71,503 | 3,549 | 0.12% |

Economy by Sector 2006

| Primary sector | Secondary sector | Service sector |
|---|---|---|
| 22.94% | 9.81% | 67.24% |

=== Health indicators ===
| HDI (2000) | Hospitals (2007) | Hospitals beds (2007) | Children's Mortality every 1000 (2005) |
|---|---|---|---|
| 0.617 | 1 | 25 | 35.3 |

== See also ==
- List of municipalities in Pernambuco
