= Gameleira =

Municipality of Pernambuco, Brazil

- Municipality
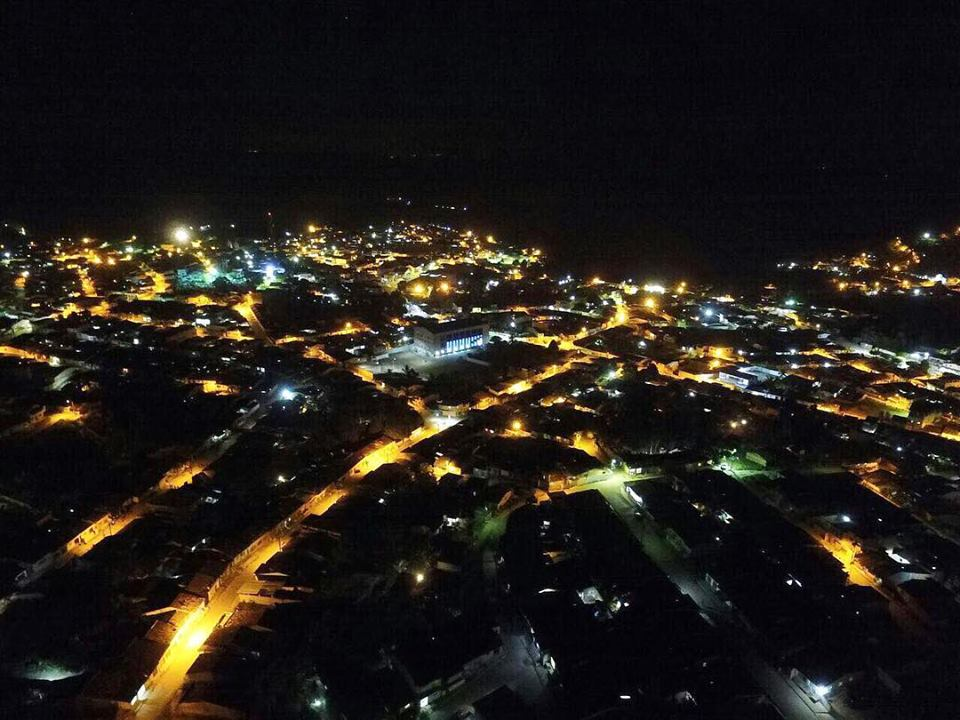
- View of the city at night.

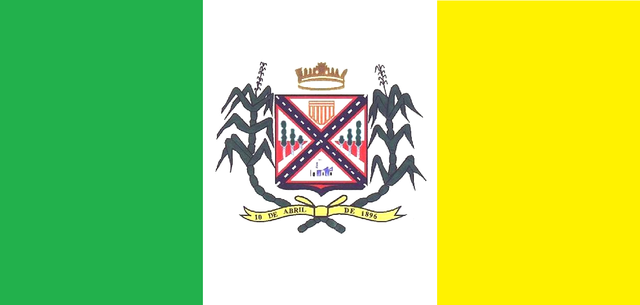
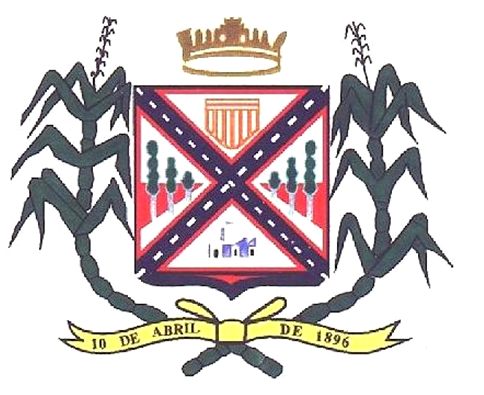
- Flag Coat of arms

- Location in Brazil
- Coordinates: 8°0′3″S 35°12′48″W
- Country: Brazil
- Region: Northeast
- State: Pernambuco

Population (2022 Census)
  - Total: 18,214
  - Estimate (2025): 17,583
- Time zone: UTC−3 (BRT)
- Website: gameleira.pe.gov.br

Gameleira (Central northeastern portuguese pronunciation: [ɡɐ̃meˈleɾɐ]) is a city in Pernambuco, Brazil. The name Gameleira is derived from the large number of Gameleira trees (family Moraceae) that were growing in the region. The city is 99 km away from Recife, the capital city of Pernambuco. Gameleira has a bus terminal, a public library, two state schools and several municipal schools.

== History ==
The district of Gameleira was created by Provincial Law 763 (Lei Provincial n° 763), on July 11, 1867. It was then part of the municipality of Sirinhaém. In 1872, it became a village (Lei Provincial n° 1.057). In 1860, the Recife–São Francisco Railroad established a station in Gameleira. Local sugarcane plantations used the railroad to transport sugar to the port in Recife.

== Geography ==
- State - Pernambuco
- Region - Zona da mata Pernambucana
- Boundaries - Ribeirão (N); Água Preta (S and W); Rio Formoso and Ribeirão (E)
- Area - 257.72 km^{2}
- Elevation - 101 m
- Hydrography - Una and Sirinhaém Rivers
- Vegetation - Subcaducifólia forest
- Climate - Hot tropical and humid
- Annual average temperature - 25.1 c
- Distance to Recife - 94 km

== Economy ==
The main economic activities in Gameleira are based in agribusiness, especially plantation of sugarcane; and creations of cattle and buffalos.

=== Economic indicators ===
Population	GDP x(1000 R$).	GDP pc (R$)	PE
27.823	77.324	2.942	0.13%

Economy by Sector

Primary sector	Secondary sector	Service sector
19.70%	6.78%	73.52%

=== Health indicators ===
HDI (2000)	Hospitals (2007)	Hospitals beds (2007)	Children's Mortality every 1000 (2005)
0.590	1	14	15.2

== See also ==
- List of municipalities in Pernambuco
