= Pombos =

Municipality of Pernambuco, Brazil

- Municipality
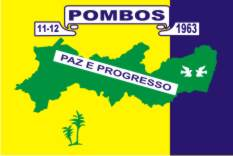
- Flag Coat of arms

- Location in Brazil
- Coordinates: 8°0′3″S 35°12′48″W
- Country: Brazil
- Region: Northeast
- State: Pernambuco

Population (2022 Census)
  - Total: 29,347
  - Estimate (2025): 30,420
- Time zone: UTC−3 (BRT)

Pombos (Central northeastern portuguese pronunciation: [ˈpõbu]) is a city in Pernambuco, Brazil. According to IBGE, it had an estimated population of 30,420 inhabitants in 2025.

== Geography ==
- State – Pernambuco
- Region – Zona da mata Pernambucana
- Boundaries – Passira (N); Primavera (S); Gravatá and Chã Grande (W); Vitória de Santo Antão (E)
- Area – 207.66 km^{2}
- Elevation – 208 m
- Hydrography – Ipojuca and Capibaribe River rivers
- Vegetation – Subperenifólia forest
- Climate – Hot tropical and humid
- Annual average temperature – 23.8 c
- Distance to Recife – 60 km

== Economy ==
The main economic activities in Pombos are based in commerce and agribusiness, especially sugarcane, pineapples, manioc, lemons and livestock such as cattle and goats.

=== Economic indicators ===
Population	GDP x(1000 R$).	GDP pc (R$)	PE
22.120	82.888	3.800	0.14%

Economy by Sector 2006

Primary sector	Secondary sector	Service sector
16.76%	8.84%	74.40%

=== Health indicators ===
HDI (2000)	Hospitals (2007)	Hospitals beds (2007)	Children's Mortality every 1000 (2005)
0.641	1	21	12.2

== See also ==
- List of municipalities in Pernambuco
