= Chã Grande =

Municipality of Pernambuco, Brazil

- Municipality
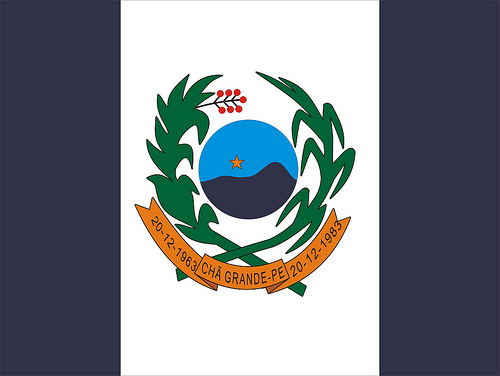
- Flag

- Location in Brazil
- Coordinates: 8°0′3″S 35°12′48″W
- Country: Brazil
- Region: Northeast
- State: Pernambuco

Population (2022 Census)
  - Total: 210,546
  - Estimate (2025): 21,258
- Time zone: UTC−3 (BRT)

Chã Grande (Central northeastern portuguese pronunciation: [ʃɐ̃ ˈɡɾɐ̃di]) is a city located in the state of Pernambuco, Brazil. It is 80 km away from Recife, the capital of the state of Pernambuco. It has an estimated (IBGE 2025) population of 21,258 inhabitants.

== Geography ==
- State - Pernambuco
- Region - Zona da Mata Pernambucana
- Boundaries - Gravatá (N and W); Amaraji and Primavera (S); Pombos (E)
- Area - 70.19 km^{2}
- Elevation - 470 m
- Hydrography - Capibaribe and Ipojuca rivers
- Vegetation - Caatinga Hipoxerófila and Caducifólia forest
- Climate - Hot tropical and humid
- Annual average temperature - 22.6 c
- Distance to Recife - 80 km

== Economy ==
The main economic activities in Chã Grande are based in agribusiness, especially sugarcane, bananas; and livestock such as cattle, sheep, goats and poultry.

=== Economic indicators ===
Population	GDP x(1000 R$).	GDP pc (R$)	PE
17.924	72.534	4.130	0.12%

Economy by Sector 2006

Primary sector	Secondary sector	Service sector
15.13%	11.87%	73.00%

=== Health indicators ===
HDI (2000)	Hospitals (2007)	Hospitals beds (2007)	Children's Mortality every 1000 (2005)
0.612	1	38	11.9

== See also ==
- List of municipalities in Pernambuco
