= Joaquim Nabuco, Pernambuco =

Municipality of Pernambuco, Brazil

Joaquim Nabuco
- Municipality of Pernambuco, Brazil
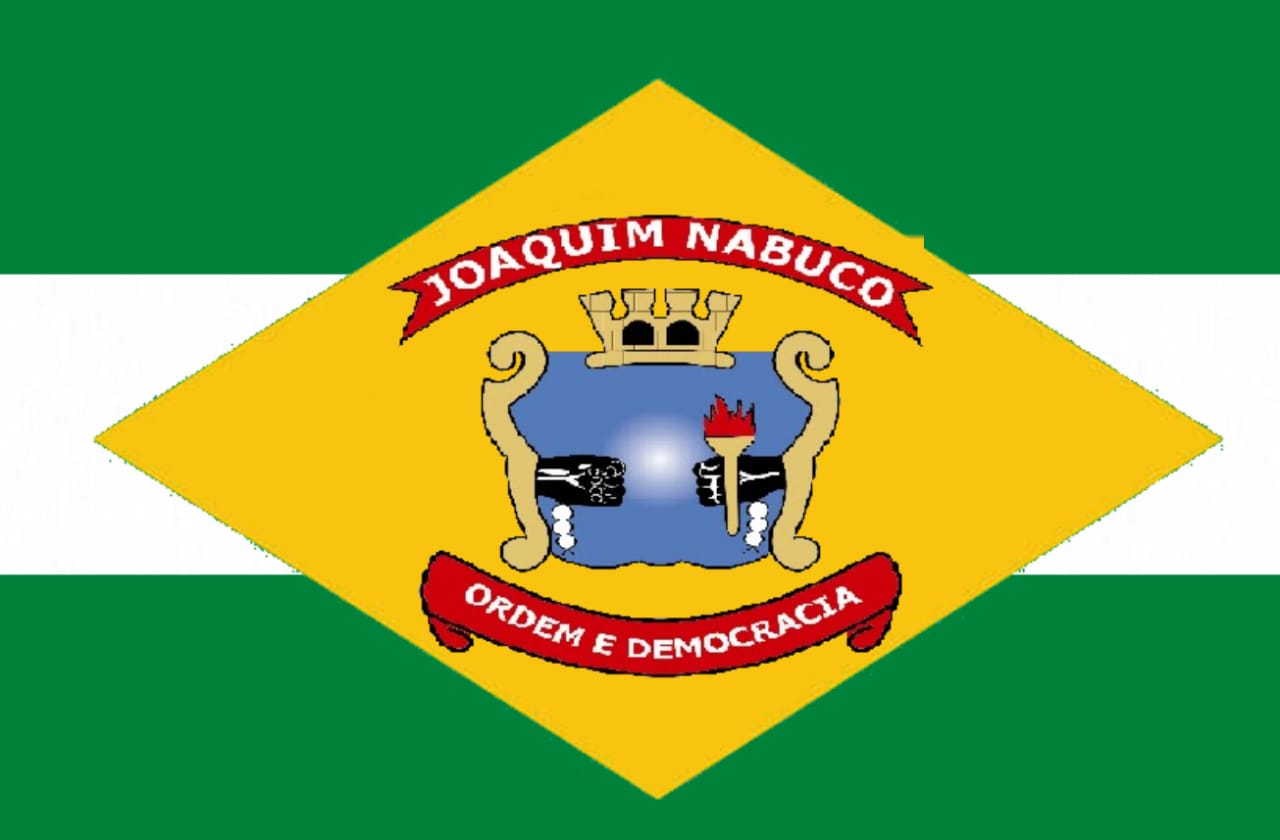
- Flag
- Etymology: Named after the statesman Joaquim Nabuco
- Location of Joaquim Nabuco in Pernambuco

- Location within Brazil Location within South America
- Coordinates: 8°37′26″S 35°31′58″W
- Country: Brazil
- Region: Northeast
- State: Pernambuco
- Founded: 30 December 1953

Government
  - Mayor: Marcia Roberta Barreto (PSDB) (2025-2028)
  - Vice Mayor: Edvania Maria da Silva (PSDB) (2025-2028)

Area
  - Total: 122.605 km^{2} (47.338 sq mi)
- Elevation: 152 m (499 ft)

Population (2022 Census)
  - Total: 13,269
  - Estimate (2025): 13,416
  - Density: 108.24/km^{2} (280.3/sq mi)
- Demonym: Nabuquense (Brazilian Portuguese)
- Time zone: UTC-03:00 (Brasília Time)
- Postal code: 55535-000
- HDI (2010): 0.554 – medium
- Website: joaquimnabuco.pe.gov.br

Joaquim Nabuco (Central northeastern portuguese pronunciation: [ʒuɐˈkĩ nɐˈbuku]) is a Brazilian municipality in the state of Pernambuco. It has an estimated population of 16,011 inhabitants as of 2020, according with IBGE. It has a total area of 121,88 km^{2}. Joaquim Nabuco was a famous Pernambuco statesman, who lived in the 19th century.

== Geography ==
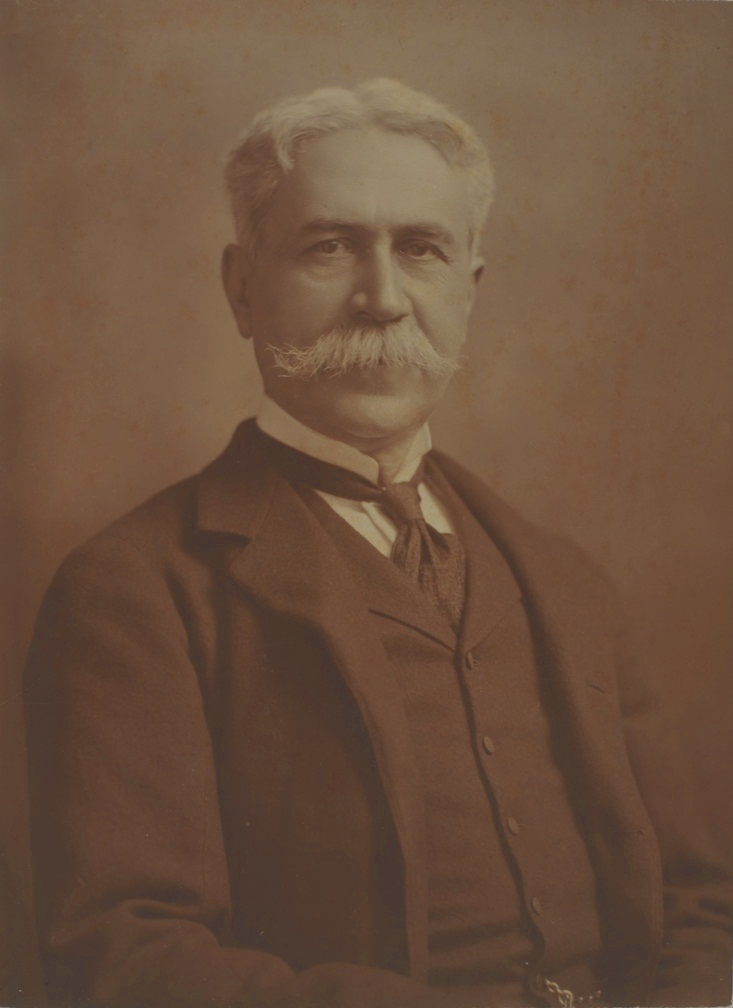
Joaquim Nabuco, famous Writer and Statesman

- State - Pernambuco
- Region - Zona da mata Pernambucana
- Boundaries - Bonito and Cortês (N); Palmares and Água Preta (S); Palmares (W); Água Preta and Ribeirão (E)
- Area - 121.88 km^{2}
- Elevation - 152 m
- Hydrography - Una and Sirinhaém Rivers
- Vegetation - Subperenifólia forest
- Climate - Hot tropical and humid
- Annual average temperature - 24.7 c
- Distance to Recife - 119 km

== Economy ==
The main economic activities in Joaquim Nabuco are based in food and beverage industry and agribusiness, especially plantations of sugarcane, manioc; and creations of cattle.

=== Economic Indicators ===
Population	GDP x(1000 R$).	GDP pc (R$)	PE
20.129	65.038	4.078	0.11%

Economy by Sector 2006

Primary sector	Secondary sector	Service sector
8.15%	38.88%	52.97%

=== Health Indicators ===
HDI (2000)	Hospitals (2007)	Hospitals beds (2007)	Children's Mortality every 1000 (2005)
0.613	1	6	33

== See also ==
- List of municipalities in Pernambuco
