= Ribeirão, Pernambuco =

Municipality in Pernambuco, Brazil

- Municipality
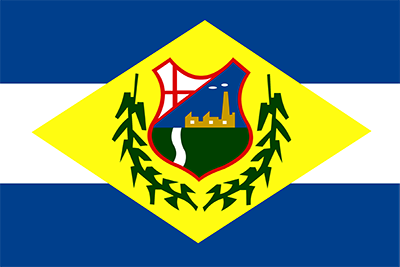
- Flag

- Location in Brazil
- Coordinates: 8°0′3″S 35°12′48″W
- Country: Brazil
- Region: Northeast
- State: Pernambuco

Population (2022 Census)
  - Total: 33,507
  - Estimate (2025): 33,843
- Time zone: UTC−3 (BRT)

Ribeirão (Central northeastern portuguese pronunciation: [hibeˈɾɐ̃w]) is a city located in the state of Pernambuco, Brazil. Located at 87 km away from Recife, capital of the state of Pernambuco. Has an estimated (IBGE 2025) population of 33,843 inhabitants.

== Geography ==
- State - Pernambuco
- Region - Zona da mata Pernambucana
- Boundaries - Amaraji, Escada and Primavera (N); Gameleira (S); Sirinhaém (E); Joaquim Nabuco, Água Preta and Cortês (W)
- Area - 287.98 km^{2}
- Elevation - 97 m
- Hydrography - Sirinhaém River
- Vegetation - Subperenifólia forest
- Climate - Hot tropical and humid
- Annual average temperature - 25.1 c
- Distance to Recife - 87 km

== Economy ==
The main economic activities in Ribeirão are based in the metallurgy industry, commerce and agribusiness, especially sugarcane, bananas, manioc; and livestock such as cattle, buffalos, goats and sheep.

=== Economic indicators ===
Population	GDP x(1000 R$).	GDP pc (R$)	PE
39,317	145.061	3.743	0.25%

Economy by Sector 2006

Primary sector	Secondary sector	Service sector
11.11%	18.72%	70.17%

=== Health indicators ===
HDI (2000)	Hospitals (2007)	Hospitals beds (2007)	Children's Mortality every 1000 (2005)
0.658	2	118	26.9

== See also ==
- List of municipalities in Pernambuco
