= Água Preta =

Municipality of Pernambuco, Brazil

Água Preta Município de Água Preta
- Municipality
- Flag Coat of arms

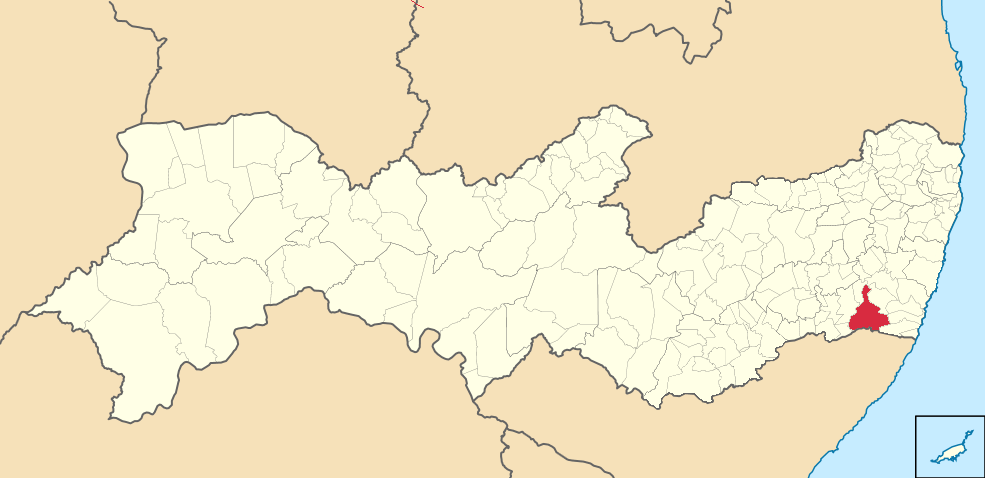
- Location of Água Preta in Pernambuco

- Location of Água Preta in Brazil
- Coordinates: 08°42′25″S 35°31′51″W
- Country: Brazil
- Region: Northeast
- State: Pernambuco
- Founded: July 3, 1892

Government
  - Mayor: Noelino Magalhaes Oliveira Lyra (PSB, 2021 - 2024)

Area
  - Total: 533.33 km^{2} (205.92 sq mi)
- Elevation: 93 m (305 ft)

Population (2022 Census)
  - Total: 26,461
  - Estimate (2025): 26,981
  - Density: 49.615/km^{2} (128.50/sq mi)
- Demonym: Água-pretense
- Time zone: UTC−3 (BRT)
- Website: aguapreta.pe.gov.br

Água Preta (Central northeastern portuguese pronunciation: [ˈaɡ͡wɐ ˈpɾetɐ]) (Black Water) is a Brazilian municipality (city) in the state of Pernambuco. It covers 531,936 km^{2} (205,382 mi^{2}), and has a population of 26.981 with a population density of 49.74 inhabitants per square kilometer (2025).

Água Preta was founded as a district of the municipality of Rio Formoso in 10 de novembro 1809. It became an independent municipality on July 3, 1895. The Praieira revolt (1848–1849), which originated Recife, spread to Água Preta in its first year. Captain Pedro Ivo Veloso da Silveira (? - 1852) took refuge in the forests of Agua Preta after the defeat of his faction in Recife and organized a guerrilla resistance for two years before his surrender.

== Geography ==
- State - Pernambuco
- Region - Zona da mata Pernambucana
- Boundaries - Ribeirão (N); Barreiros and Alagoas state (S); Palmares, Xexéu and Joaquim Nabuco (W); Tamandaré and Gameleira (E)
- Area - 533.33 km^{2} (205.92 mi^{2})
- Elevation - 93 metres (305 ft)
- Hydrography - Una and Sirinhaém Rivers
- Vegetation - Subperenifólia forest
- Climate - hot, tropical, and humid
- Annual average temperature - 25.2 c
- Distance to the capital (Recife) - 125 kilometres (78 mi)

== Economy ==
The main economic activities in Água Preta are based in agribusiness, especially plantations of sugarcane and cattle-keeping. The city's other main economy is the civil service.

=== Economic indicators ===
Population	GDP (1.000.000 R$)	GDP pc (R$)	PE
33.095	246.012,40	6.748,57	0.16%

Economy by sector 2006

Primary sector	Secondary sector	Service sector
21.91%	7.78%	70.31%

=== Health indicators ===
HDI (2000)	Hospitals (2007)	Hospitals beds (2007)	Children's mortality every 1000 (2005)
0.597	1	16	20

== See also ==
- List of municipalities in Pernambuco
