= Cortês =

Municipality of Pernambuco State, Brazil

- Municipality of Pernambuco, Brazil
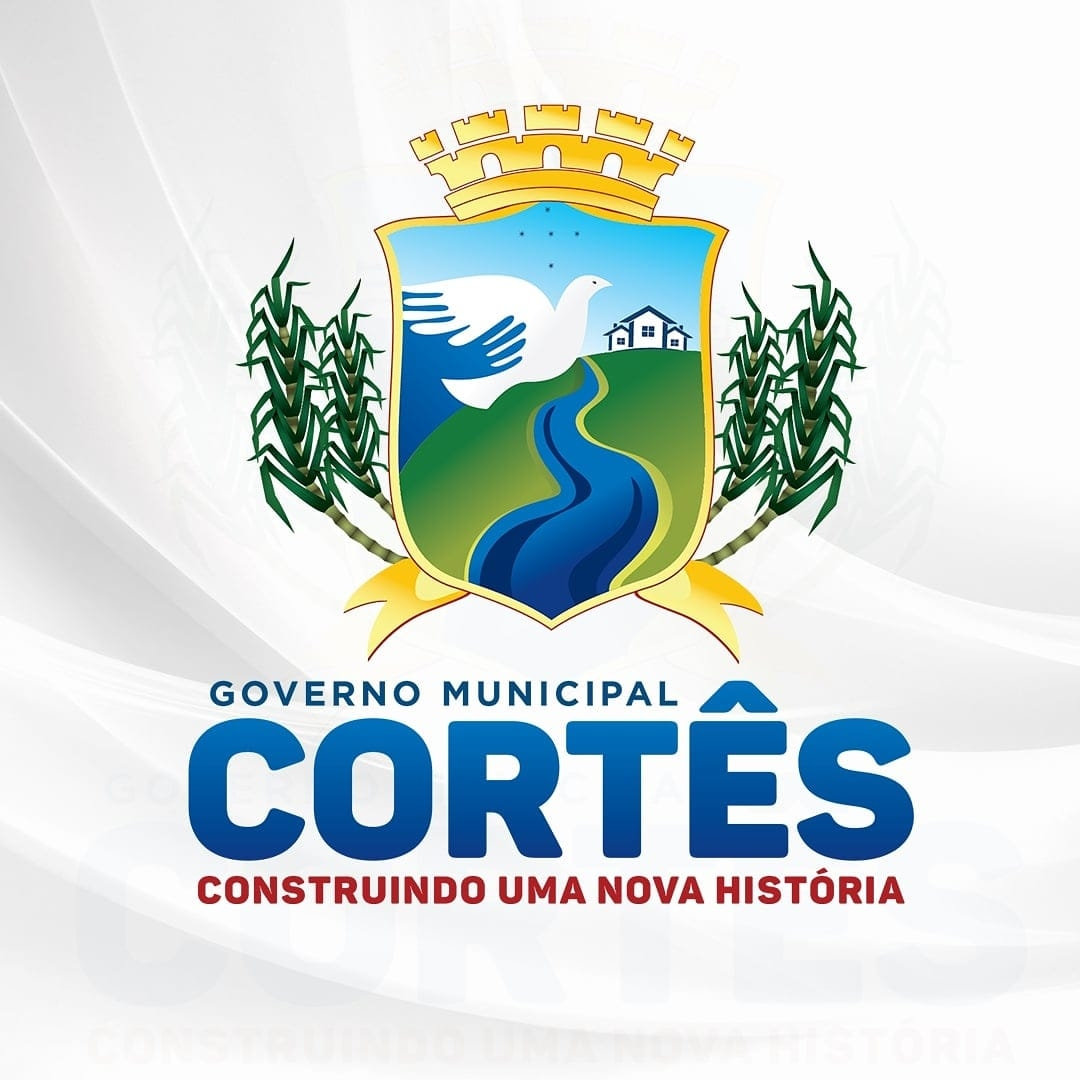
- Coat of arms

- Location of Cortês in Pernambuco

- Location within Brazil Location within South America
- Coordinates: 8°28′12″S 35°32′27″W
- Country: Brazil
- Region: Northeast
- State: Pernambuco
- Founded: 29 December 1953

Government
  - Mayor: Maria de Fatima Cysneiros Sampaio Borba (PSDB) (2025-2028)
  - Vice Mayor: Antonio Mauro da Costa (Republicanos) (2025-2028)

Area
  - Total: 103.416 km^{2} (39.929 sq mi)
- Elevation: 302 m (991 ft)

Population (2022 Census)
  - Total: 10,198
  - Estimate (2025): 10,426
  - Density: 99.15/km^{2} (256.8/sq mi)
- Demonym: Cortesense (Brazilian Portuguese)
- Time zone: UTC-03:00 (Brasília Time)
- Postal code: 55525-000
- HDI (2010): 0.568 – medium
- Website: cortes.pe.gov.br

Cortês (Central northeastern portuguese pronunciation: [koɦˈtejs]) is a city in the Brazilian state of Pernambuco. It is 149 km away from the state capital Recife, and has an estimated (IBGE 2020) population of 12,560 inhabitants.

== Geography ==
- State - Pernambuco
- Region - Zona da mata Pernambucana
- Boundaries - Gravatá (N); Joaquim Nabuco (S); Amaraji and Ribeirão (E); Bonito and Barra de Guabiraba (W)
- Area - 101.33 km^{2}
- Elevation - 302 m
- Hydrography - Sirinhaém River
- Vegetation - Subperenifólia forest
- Climate - Hot tropical and humid
- Annual average temperature - 23.5 c
- Distance to Recife - 149 km

== Economy ==
The main economic activities in Cortês are largely dominated by the food & beverage industry and agribusiness, especially sugarcane, bananas and cattle.

=== Economic indicators ===
Population	GDP x(1000 R$).	GDP pc (R$)	PE
11.712	63.717	5.485	0.10%

Economy by Sector 2006

Primary sector	Secondary sector	Service sector
13.16%	27.30%	59.54%

=== Health indicators ===
HDI (2000)	Hospitals (2007)	Hospitals beds (2007)	Children's Mortality every 1000 (2005)
0.582	1	23	26.5

== See also ==
- List of municipalities in Pernambuco
