= Sairé =

Municipality in Pernambuco, Brazil

Coordinates: 8°20′S 35°39′W

- Municipality
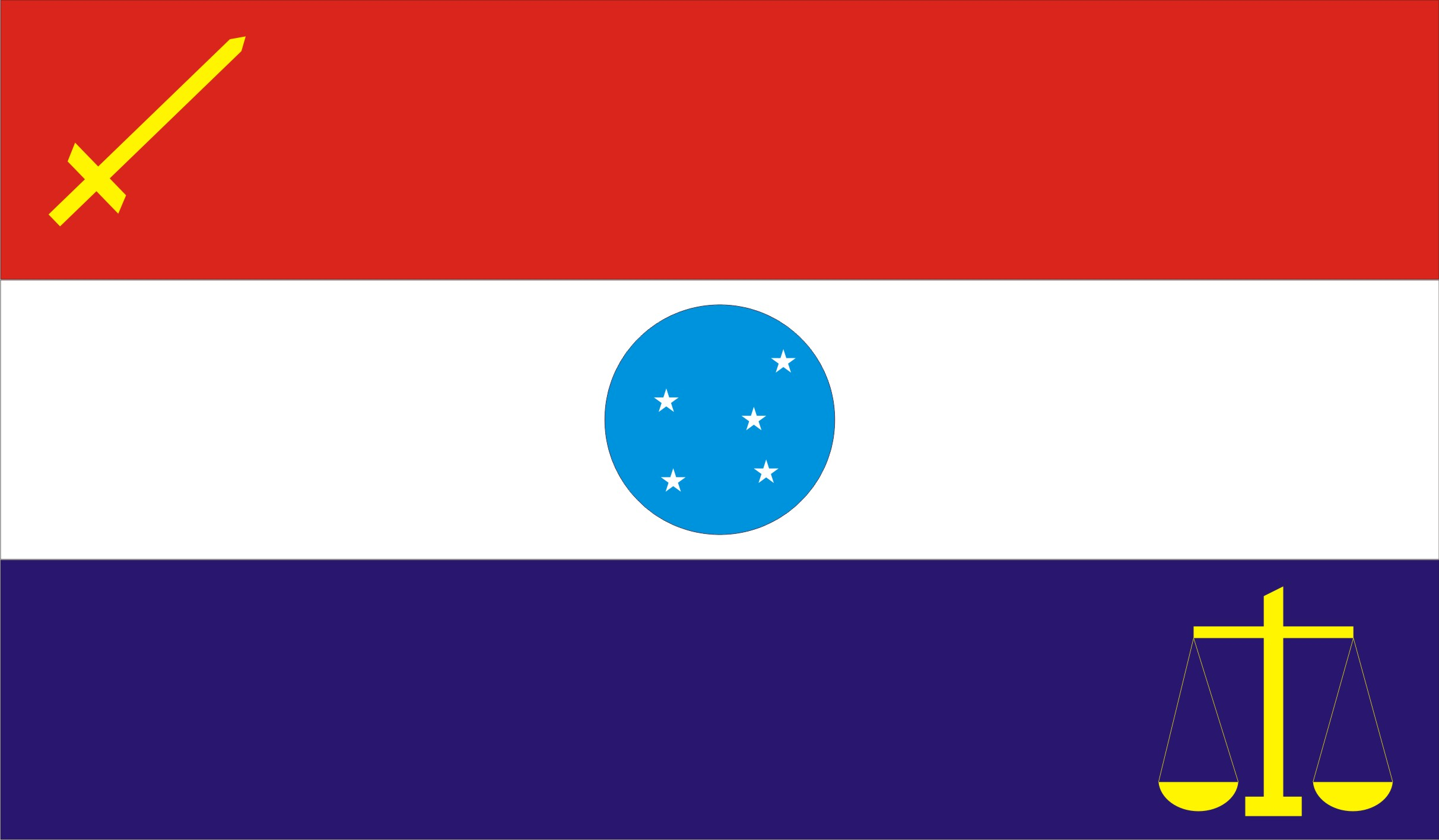
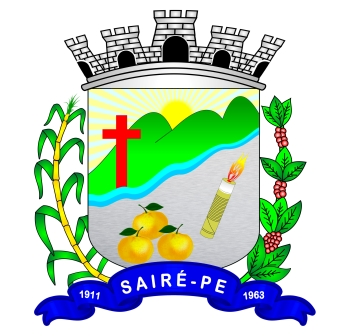
- Flag Coat of arms

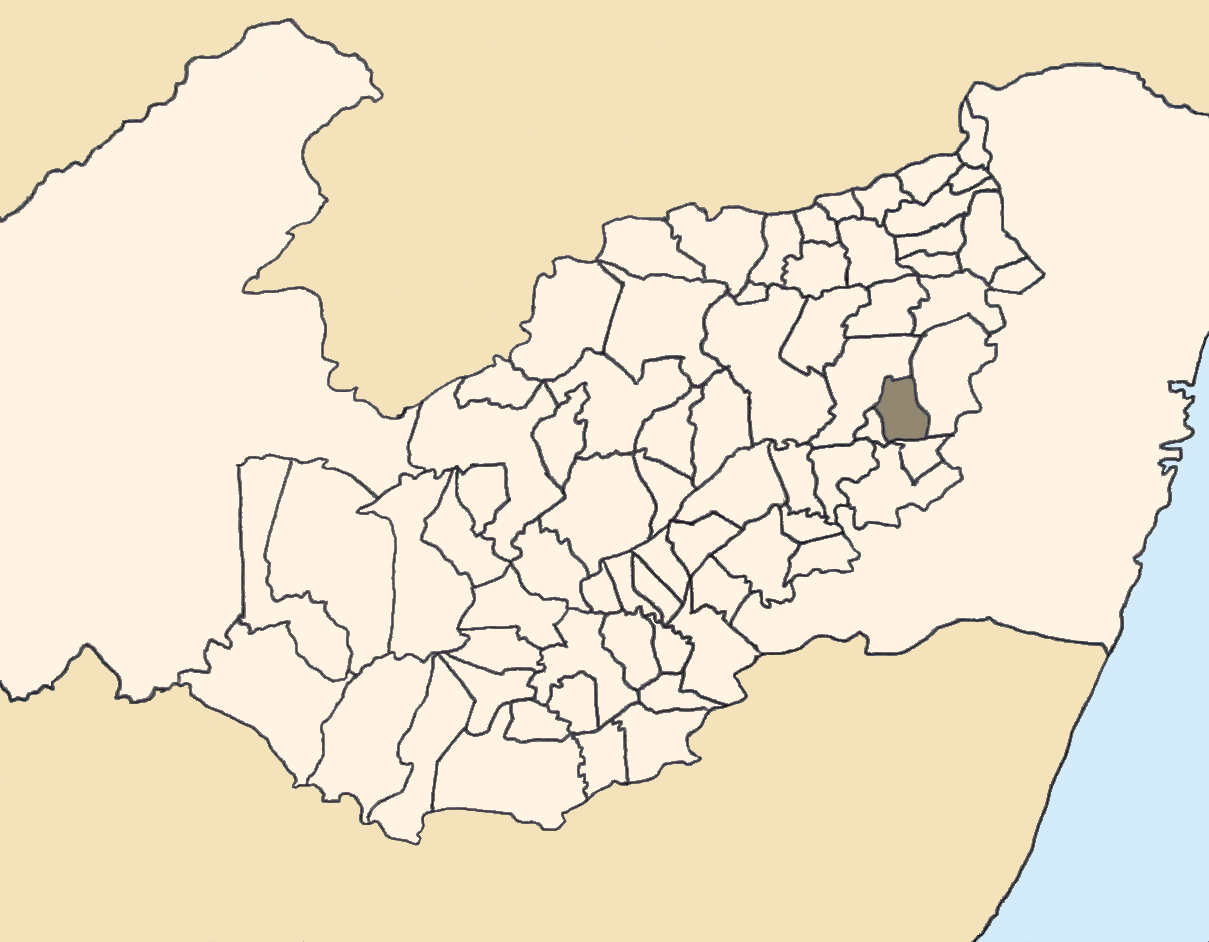
- Location of Sairé within Pernambuco.

- Location in Brazil
- Country: Brazil
- State: Pernambuco
- Region: Agreste Pernambucano

Area
  - Total: 195.46 km^{2} (75.47 sq mi)
- Elevation: 663 m (2,175 ft)

Population (2022 Census)
  - Total: 10,887
  - Estimate (2025): 11,213
- Time zone: UTC-3 (BRT)
  - Summer (DST): UTC-2 (BRST)

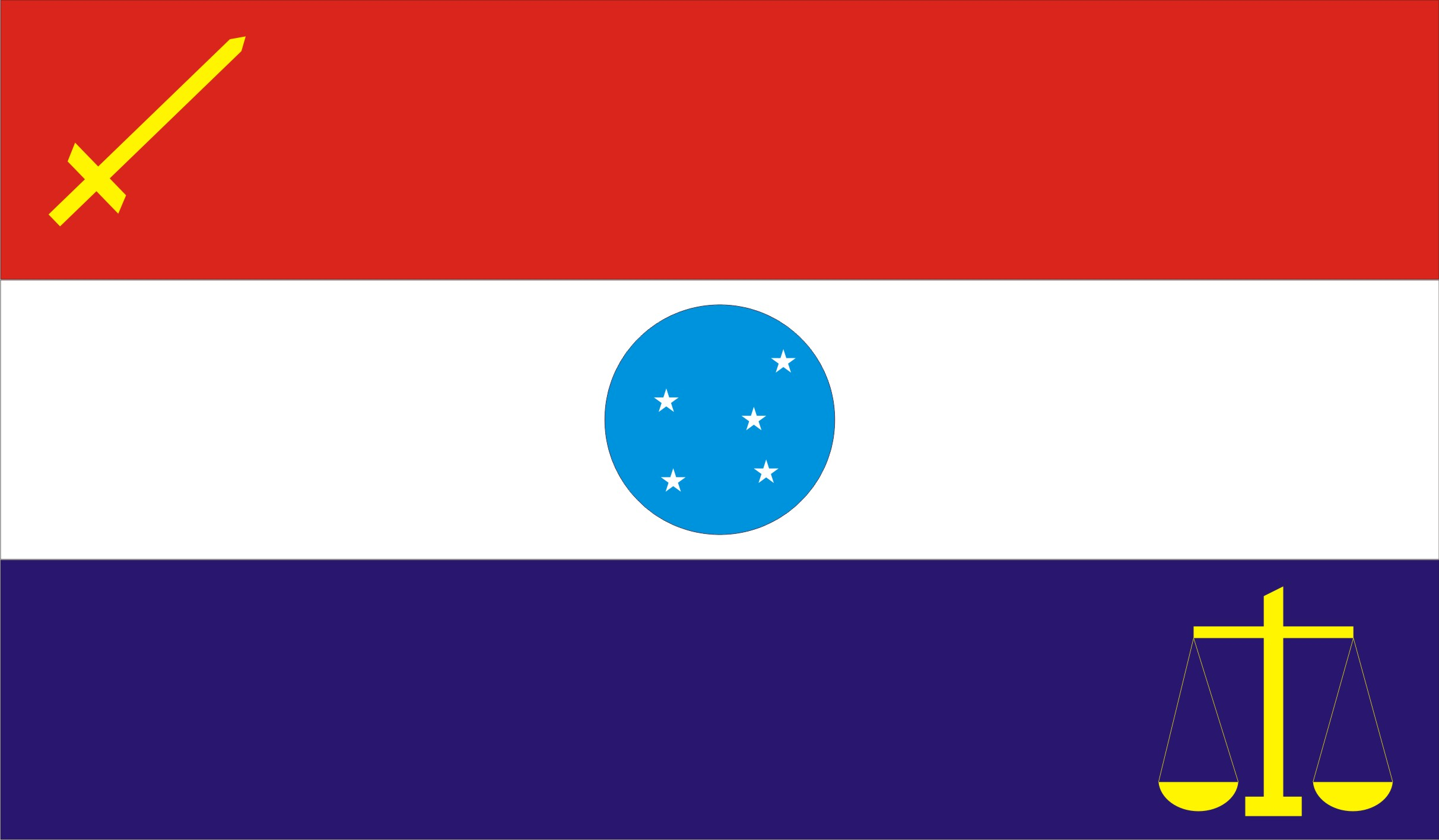
City Flag

Sairé (Central northeastern portuguese pronunciation: [sajˈɾɛ]) is a municipality located in the state of Pernambuco, Brazil. Located 110.7 km away from Recife, the capital of the state of Pernambuco, it has an estimated (2022 Census) population of 10,887 inhabitants.

== Geography ==
- State - Pernambuco
- Region - Agreste Pernambucano
- Boundaries - Bezerros (N); Bonito and Barra de Guabiraba (S); Gravatá (E); Camocim de São Félix (W).
- Area - 195.46 km^{2}
- Elevation - 663 m
- Hydrography - Ipojuca and Sirinhaém rivers
- Vegetation - Subcaducifólia and hipoxerófila
- Climate - Tropical hot and humid
- Annual average temperature - 24.0 c
- Distance to Recife - 110.7 km

== Economy ==
The main economic activities in Sairé are based in agribusiness, especially tomatoes, tangerines, passion fruits; and livestock such as cattle, sheep and poultry.

=== Economic indicators ===
Population	GDP x(1000 R$).	GDP pc (R$)	PE
14.194	48.553	3.542	0.08%

Economy by Sector 2006

Primary sector	Secondary sector	Service sector
21.24%	9.69%	69.07%

=== Health indicators ===
HDI (2000)	Hospitals (2007)	Hospitals beds (2007)	Children's Mortality every 1000 (2005)
0.598	1	20	27

== See also ==
- List of municipalities in Pernambuco
