= Bonito, Pernambuco =

City in Pernambuco, Brazil

Bonito
- Municipality of Pernambuco, Brazil
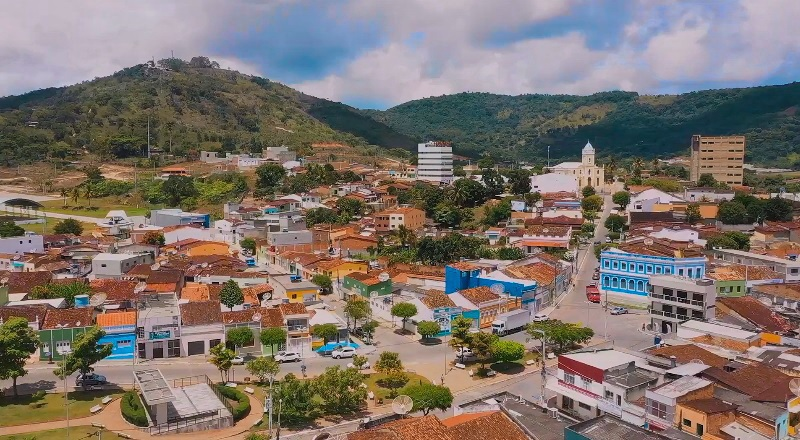
- Aerial view of Bonito

- Flag Coat of arms

- Location of Bonito in Pernambuco

- Location within Brazil Location within South America
- Coordinates: 8°28′12″S 35°43′44″W
- Country: Brazil
- Region: Northeast
- State: Pernambuco
- Founded: 12 April 1839

Government
  - Mayor: Ruy Barbosa (PSB) (2025-2028)
  - Vice Mayor: José Roberval dos Santos (PP) (2025-2028)

Area
  - Total: 393.191 km^{2} (151.812 sq mi)
- Elevation: 443 m (1,453 ft)

Population (2022)
  - Total: 37,474
  - Estimate (2025): 39,212
  - Density: 95.31/km^{2} (246.9/sq mi)
- Demonym: Bonitense (Brazilian Portuguese)
- Time zone: UTC-03:00 (Brasília Time)
- Postal code: 55680-000, 55682-000, 55685-000
- HDI (2010): 0.561 – medium
- Website: bonito.pe.gov.br

Bonito (Central northeastern portuguese pronunciation: [buˈnitu]) (Beautiful) (population 38,117) is a city in northeastern Brazil, in the State of Pernambuco. It lies in the mesoregion of Agreste of Pernambuco. It has a total area of 399.5 km^{2} (154.2 sq mi).

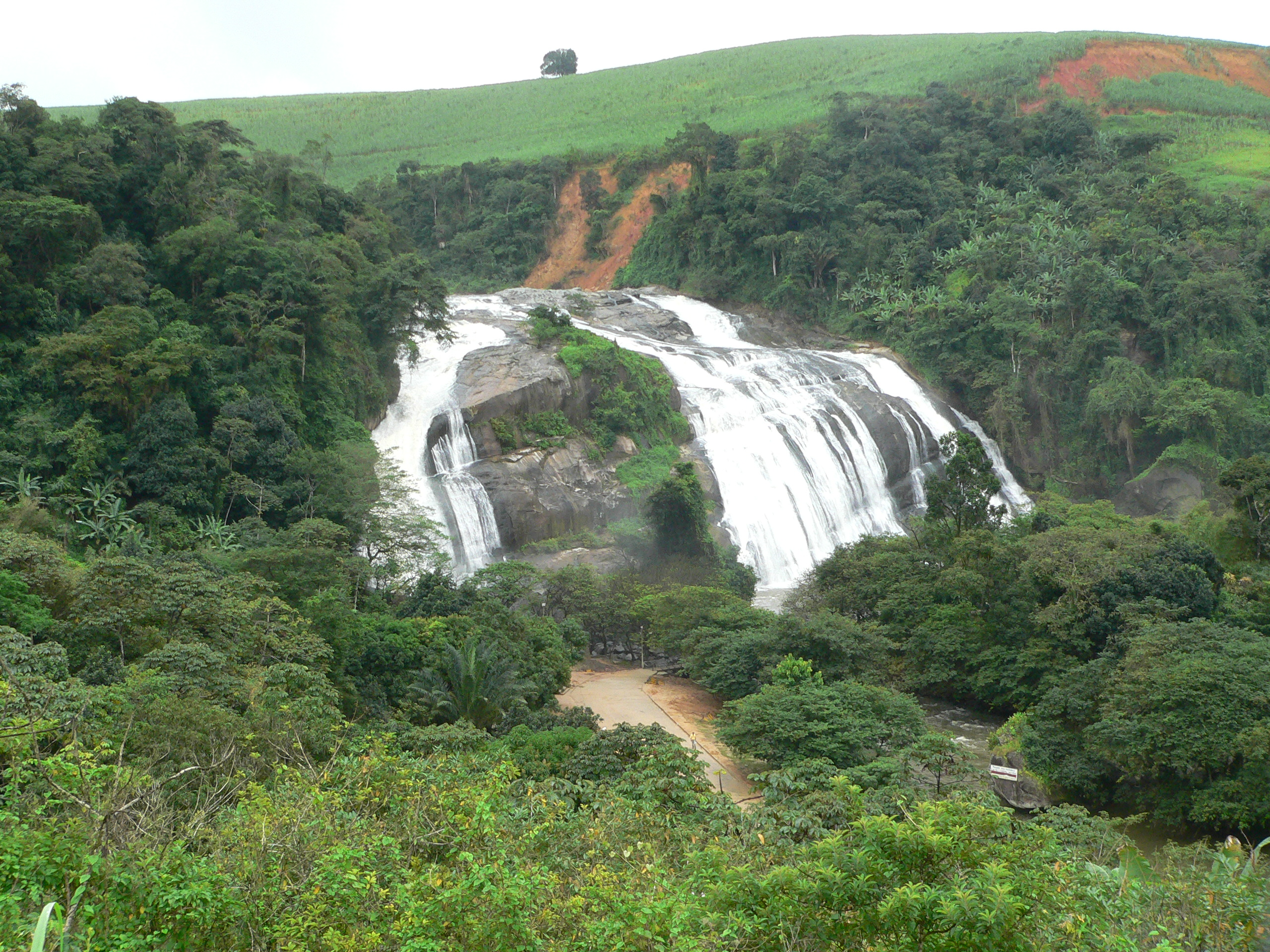
Urubu Waterfalls between Bonito and Primavera

== Geography ==
- State - Pernambuco
- Region - Agreste of Pernambuco
- Boundaries - Camocim de São Félix, Sairé and Barra de Guabiraba (N); Palmares and Catende(S), Cortês and Joaquim Nabuco (E); São Joaquim do Monte and Belém de Maria (W).
- Area - 399.5 km^{2}
- Elevation - 443 m
- Hydrography - Sirinhaém and Una rivers
- Vegetation - Subcaducifolia Forest
- Climate - Hot and Humid
- Annual average temperature - 21 c
- Main road - BR 232 and PE 103
- Distance to Recife - 128 km

== Economy ==
Principal economic activity for Bonito is the agricultural sector. Sugar cane, cattle, tuber production, poultry and fruit. tourism is an emerging field due to the many natural waterfalls accessible by a newly asphalted highway.

Bonito is experiencing a real estate boom driving up the prices of building lots and rental units, proposed improvements to the main route into the city will further drive development.

=== Economic Indicators ===
Population	GDP x(1000 R$).	GDP pc (R$)	PE
39,212	139.985	3.579	0.24%

Economy by Sector 2006

Primary sector	Secondary sector	Service sector
21.66%	10.37%	67.97%

=== Health Indicators ===
HDI (2000)	Hospitals (2007)	Hospitals beds (2007)	Children's Mortality every 1000 (2005)
0.593	1	52	25.5

== See also ==
- List of municipalities in Pernambuco
