= Palmares, Pernambuco =

Municipality of Pernambuco, Brazil

Palmares
- Municipality of Pernambuco, Brazil
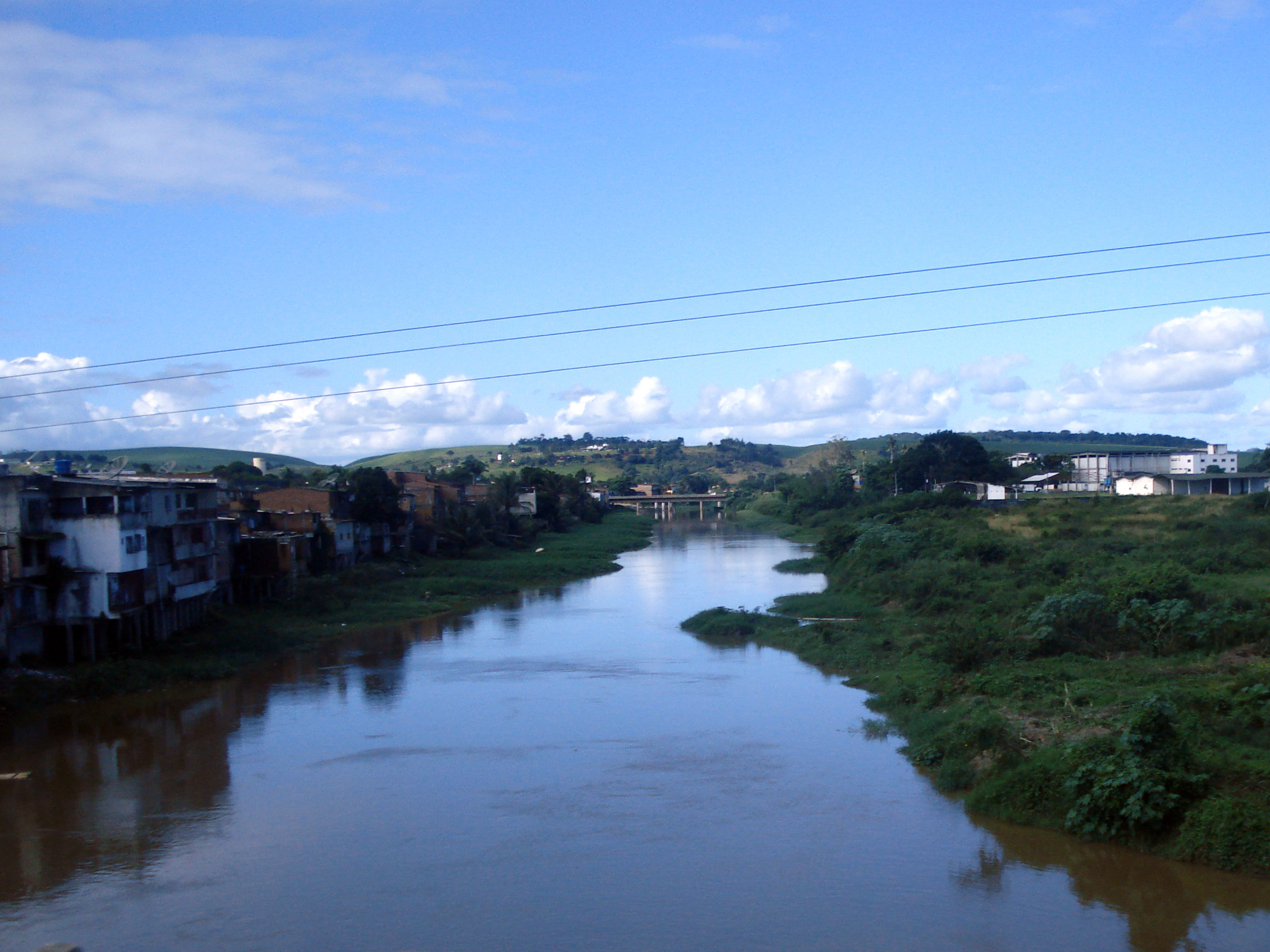
- Una River in Palmares

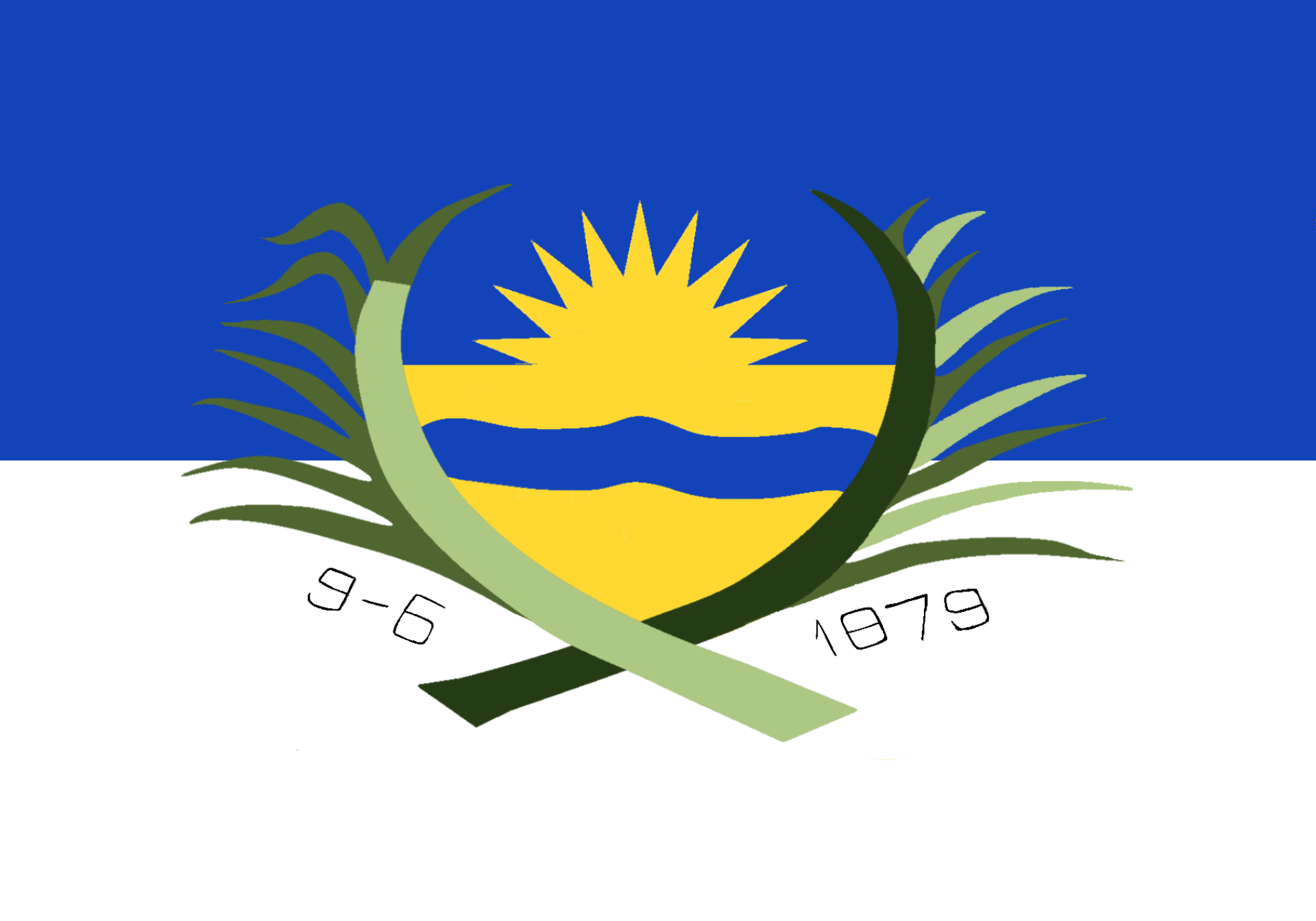
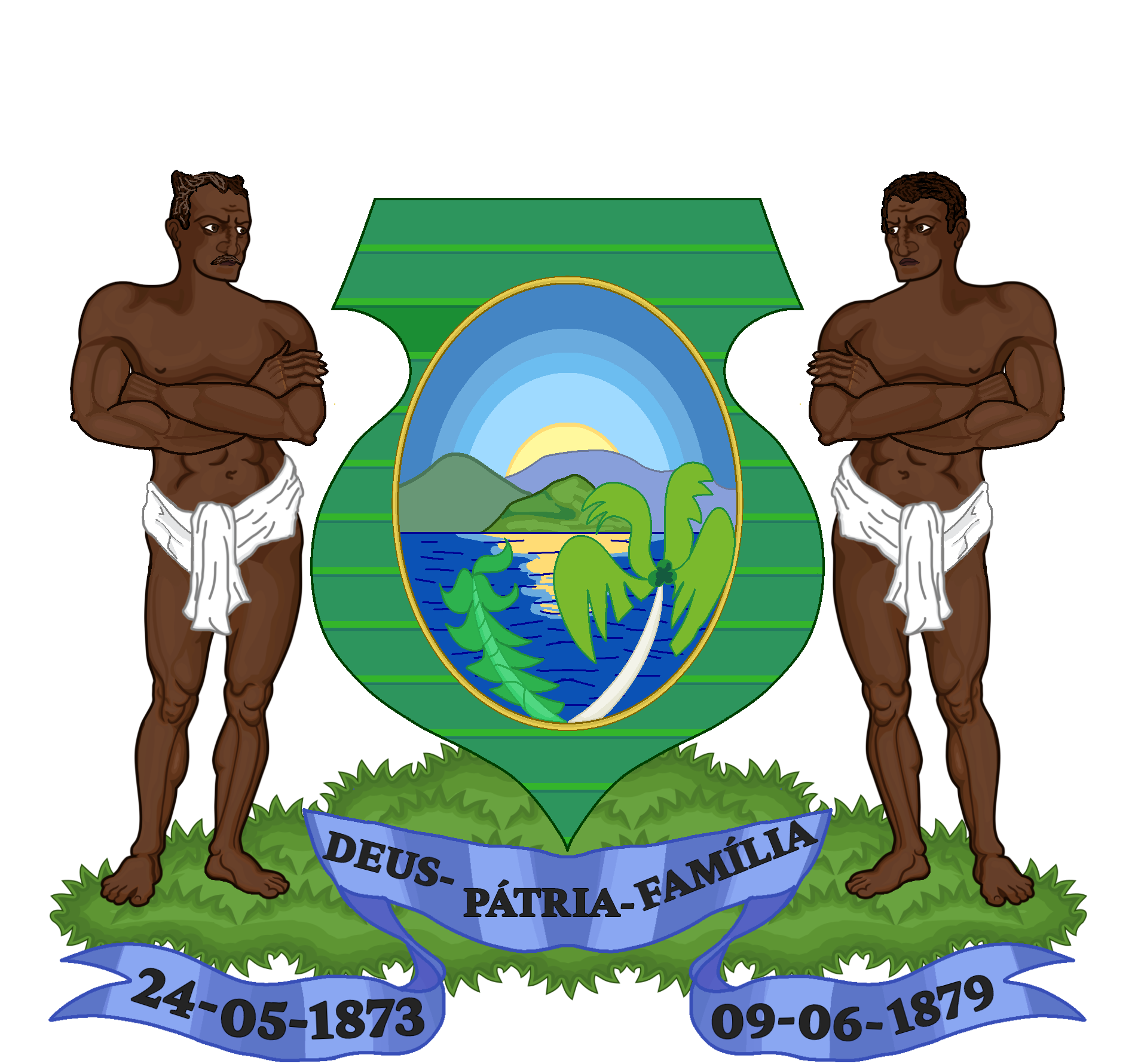
- Flag Coat of arms

- Location of Palmares in Pernambuco

- Location within Brazil Location within South America
- Coordinates: 8°40′58″S 35°35′31″W
- Country: Brazil
- Region: Northeast
- State: Pernambuco
- Founded: 9 June 1879

Government
  - Mayor: José Bartolomeu de Almeida Melo Junior (PP) (2025-2028)
  - Vice Mayor: Francisco Vieira de Melo Neto (PSDB) (2025-2028)

Area
  - Total: 339.388 km^{2} (131.038 sq mi)
- Elevation: 125 m (410 ft)

Population (2022 Census)
  - Total: 54,584
  - Estimate (2025): 56,475
  - Density: 160.82/km^{2} (416.5/sq mi)
- Demonym: Palmarense (Brazilian Portuguese)
- Time zone: UTC-03:00 (Brasília Time)
- Postal code: 55540-000, 55548-000
- HDI (2010): 0.622 – medium
- Website: palmares.pe.gov.br

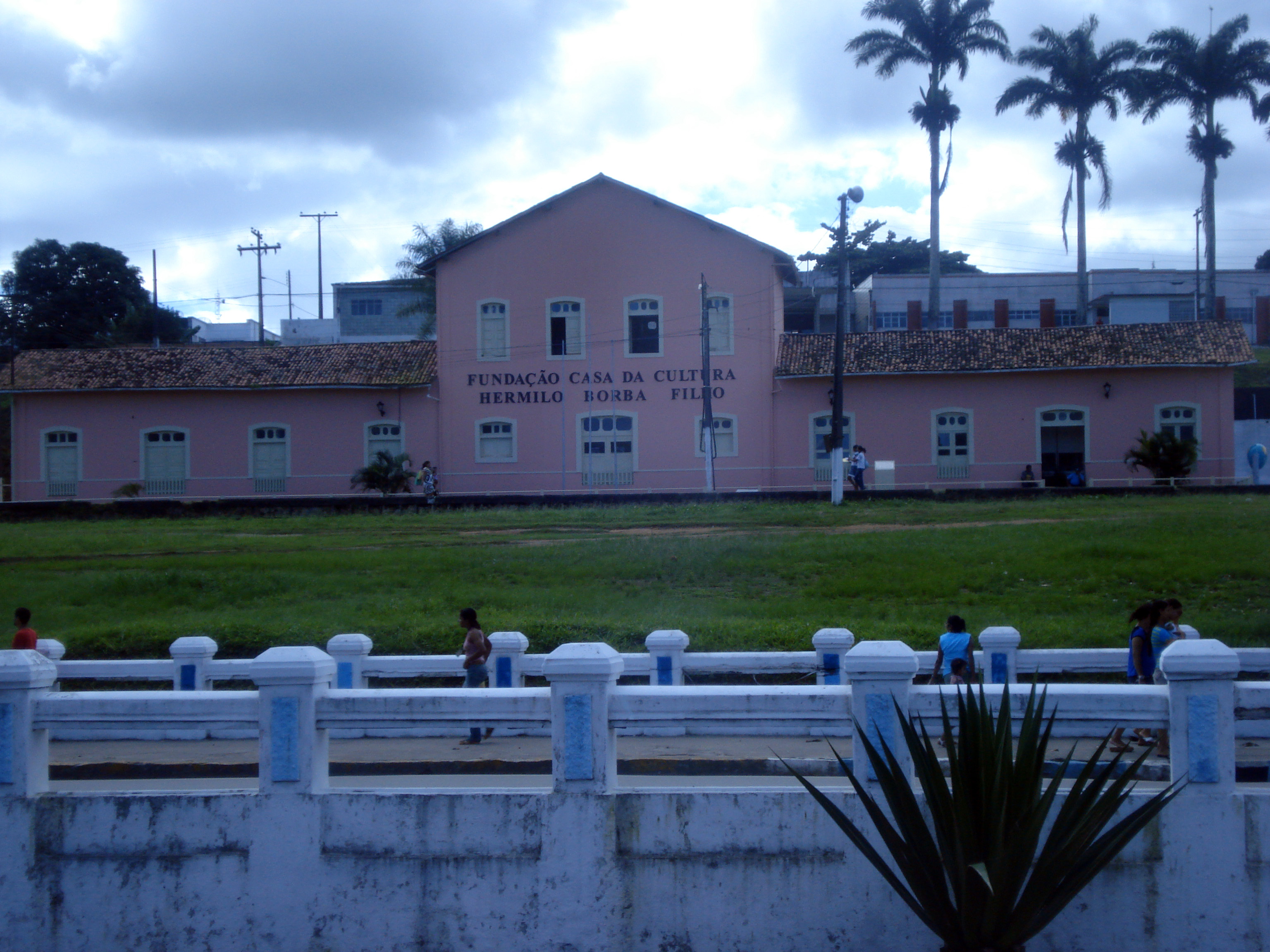
Palmares Cultural House

Palmares (Central northeastern portuguese pronunciation: [pɐwˈmɐɾis]) is a city in northeastern Brazil, in the state of Pernambuco, with 63,500 inhabitants, according with IBGE 2020. Its main activity is the combined field of agriculture and livestock (Portuguese: agropecuária). It received its name from the Portuguese people who named it that due to the number of palm trees in the area where run-away slaves had created approximately 16 quilombos, led by Zumbi.

== Geography ==
- State - Pernambuco
- Region - Zona da mata Pernambucana
- Boundaries - Bonito (N); Xexéu (S); Catende (W); Joaquim Nabuco and Água Preta (E)
- Area - 386.84 km^{2}
- Elevation - 108 m
- Hydrography - Una river
- Vegetation - Subperenifólia forest
- Climate - Hot tropical and humid
- Annual average temperature - 22 c
- Distance to Recife - 120 km

== Economy ==
The main economic activities in Palmares are based in industry, commerce and agribusiness especially, sugarcane, bananas; and creations of cattle, horses and mules.

=== Economic Indicators ===
Population	GDP x(1000 R$).	GDP pc (R$)	PE
58.819	305.367	5.391	0.50%

Economy by Sector 2006

Primary sector	Secondary sector	Service sector
5.88%	9.65%	84.47%

=== Health Indicators ===
HDI (2000)	Hospitals (2007)	Hospitals beds (2007)	Children's Mortality every 1000 (2005)
0.653	3	324	27.7

== See also ==
- List of municipalities in Pernambuco
- Palmares (quilombo)
- Quilombo
- Zumbi
