= Xexéu =

City in Pernambuco, Brazil

- Municipality of Pernambuco, Brazil
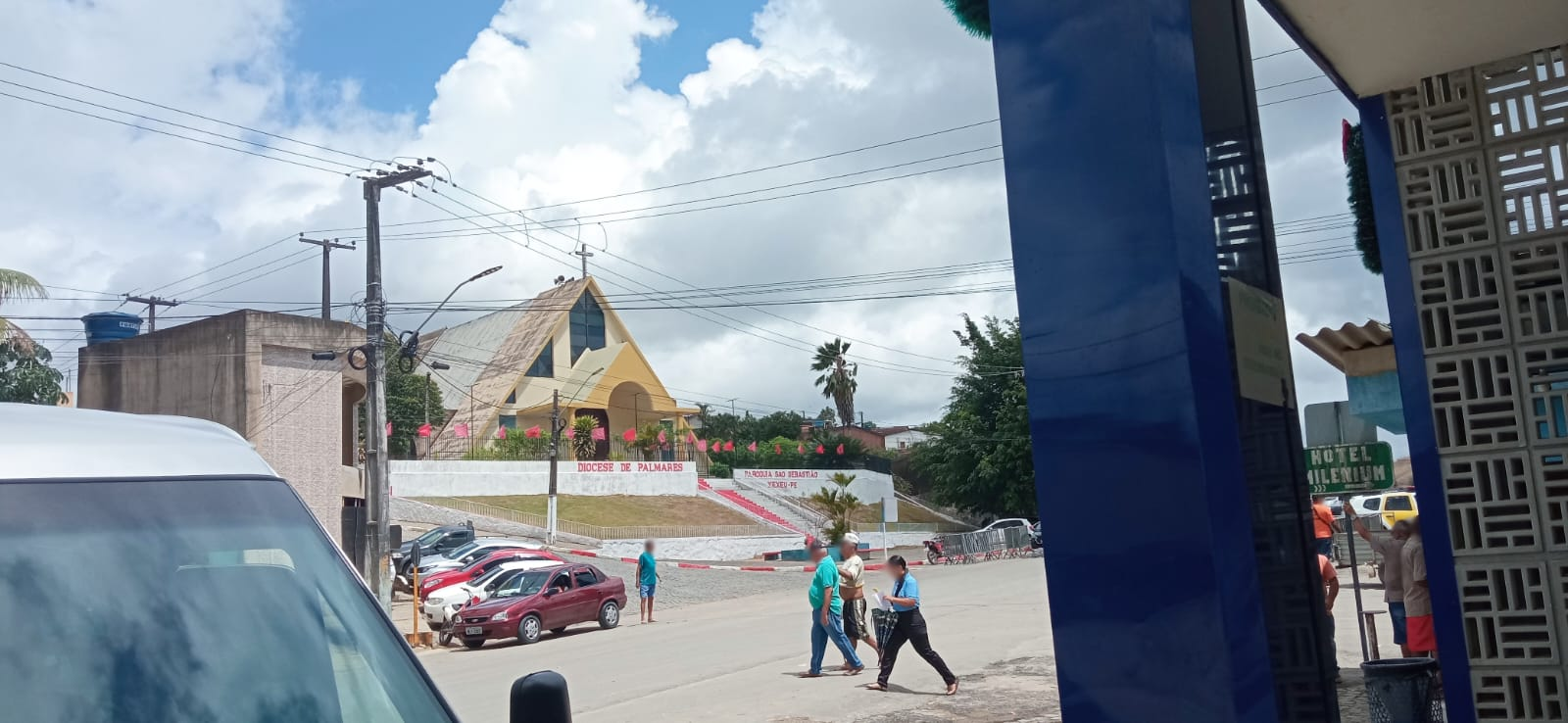
- Church of Saint Sebastian in Xexéu

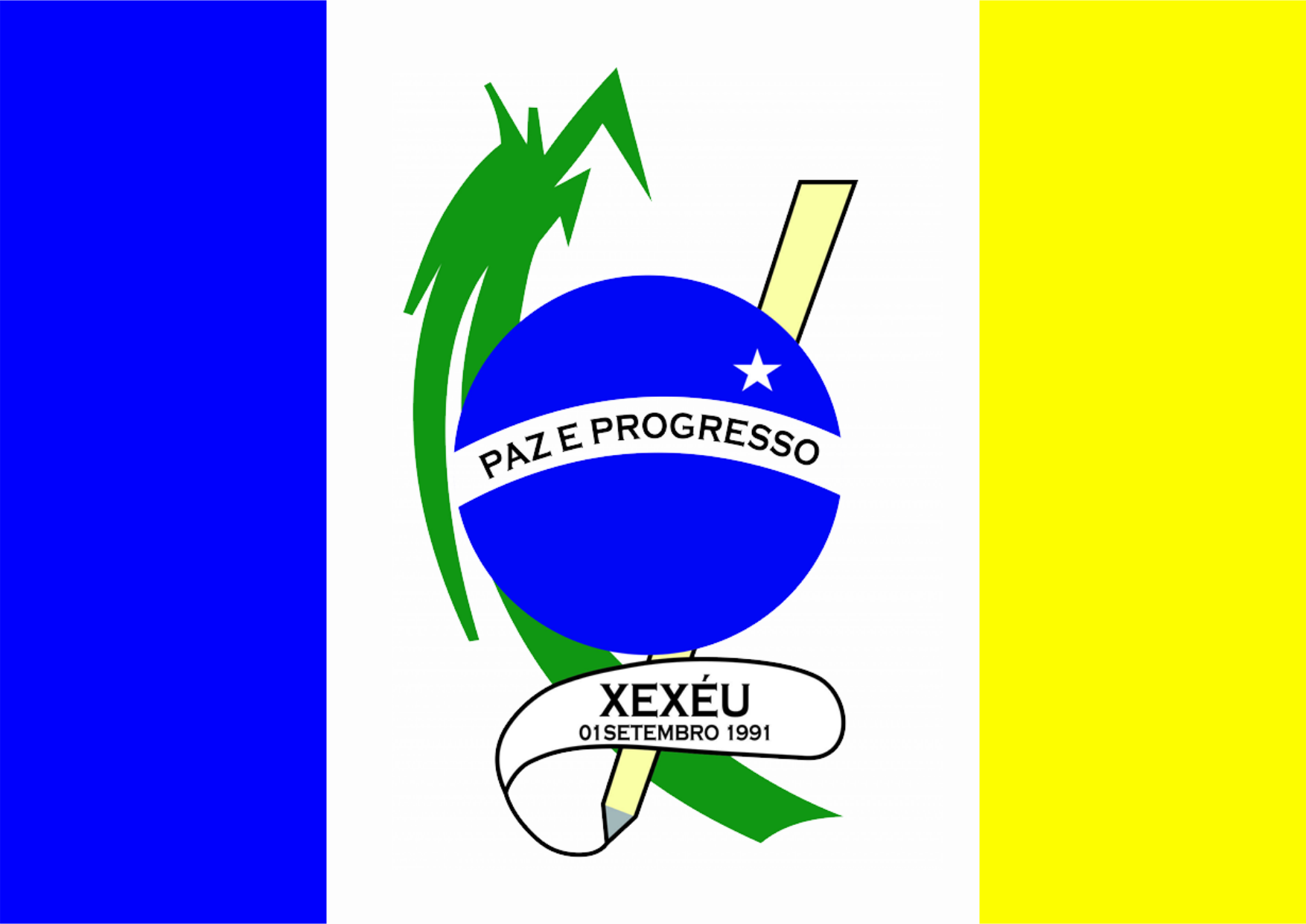
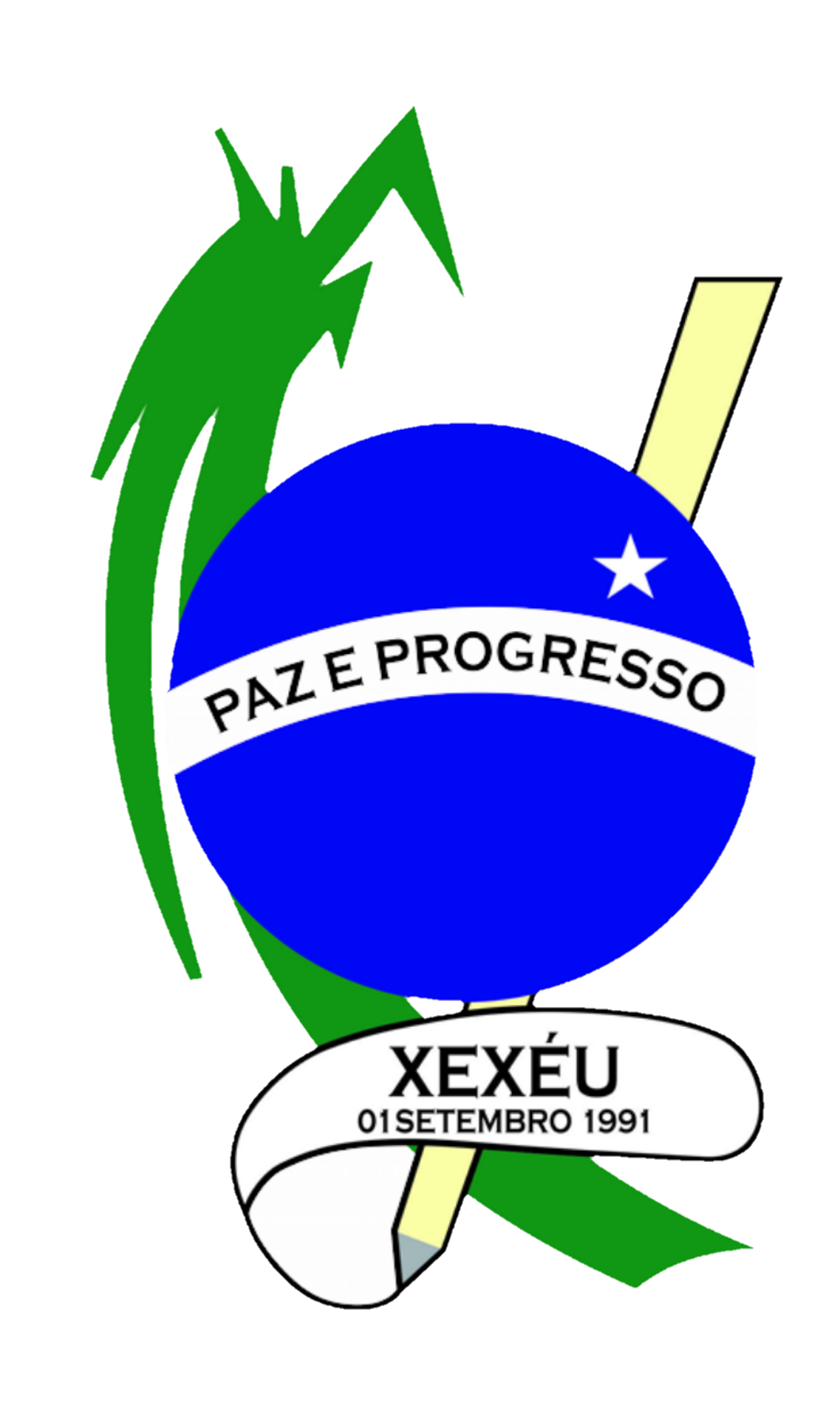
- Flag Coat of arms
- Etymology: Named after the Xexéu (Cacicus cela) bird
- Motto: Brazilian Portuguese: Paz e progresso English: Peace and progress
- Location of Xexéu in Pernambuco

- Location within Brazil Location within South America
- Coordinates: 8°48′7″S 35°37′37″W
- Country: Brazil
- Region: Northeast
- State: Pernambuco
- Founded: 1 October 1991

Government
  - Mayor: Thiago Gonçalves de Lima (PSD) (2025-2028)
  - Vice Mayor: Maria Patrícia Ludovico Gonçalves de Lima (PL) (2025-2028)

Area
  - Total: 110.815 km^{2} (42.786 sq mi)
- Elevation: 200 m (660 ft)

Population (2022 Census)
  - Total: 11,611
  - Estimate (2025): 11,699
  - Density: 104.78/km^{2} (271.4/sq mi)
- Demonym: Xexeuense (Brazilian Portuguese)
- Time zone: UTC-03:00 (Brasília Time)
- Postal code: 55555-000
- HDI (2010): 0.552 – medium
- Website: xexeu.pe.gov.br

Xexéu (Central northeastern portuguese pronunciation: [ʃɛˈʃɛw]) is a city in the state of Pernambuco, Brazil. It is located in Zona da mata Pernambucana 143 km (89 mi) from the state capital Recife. It was first municipality in Latin America to use ecological asphalt.

== Geography ==
- State: Pernambuco
- Region: Zona da mata Pernambucana
- Boundaries: Palmares (N); Alagoas (S); Maraial (W); Água Preta (E)
- Area: 110.8 km^{2} (42.8 sq mi)
- Elevation: 200 m (660 ft)
- Hydrography: Una river
- Vegetation: Subperenifólia forest
- Climate: Hot tropical and humid
- Annual average temperature: 24.5 °C (76.1 °F)
- Distance to Recife: 143 km (89 mi)
- Population - 11,699 (2025)

== Economy ==
The main economic activities in Xexéu are based in agriculture, especially sugarcane.

=== Economic indicators ===
| Population | GDP x(1000 R$). | GDP pc (R$) | PE |
|---|---|---|---|
| 14.887 | 41.899 | 2.946 | 0.07% |

Economy by sector 2006

| Primary sector | Secondary sector | Service sector |
|---|---|---|
| 12.56% | 7.72% | 79.72% |

=== Health indicators ===
| HDI (2000) | Hospitals (2007) | Hospitals beds (2007) | Child mortality per 1000 (2005) |
|---|---|---|---|
| 0.561 | 1 | 14 | 34.8 |

== See also ==
- List of municipalities in Pernambuco
