= Barra de Guabiraba =

Municipality of Pernambuco, Brazil

- City
- Flag Coat of arms

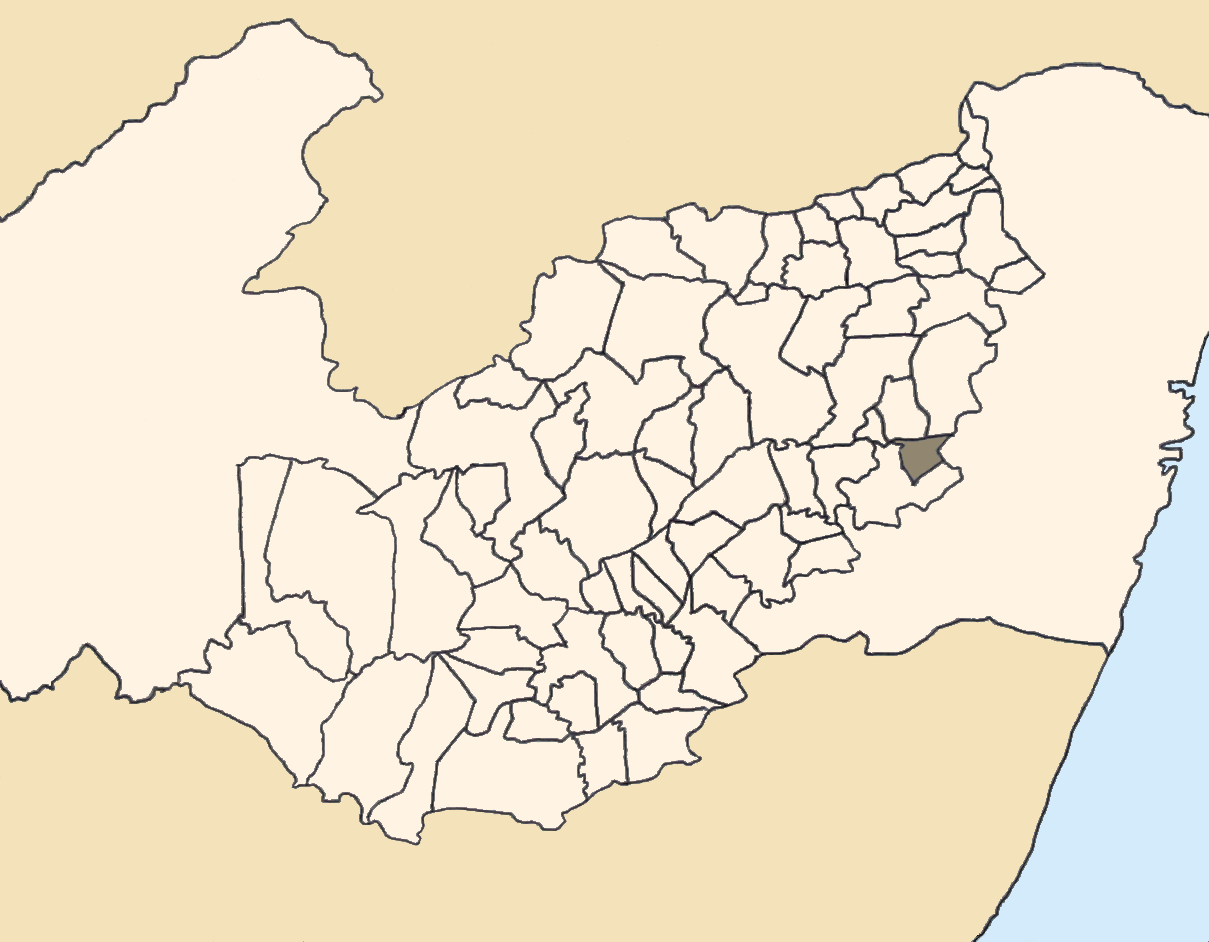
- Location of Barra de Guabiraba within Pernambuco
- Coordinates: 8°29′31″S 35°39′33″W
- Country: Brazil
- State: Pernambuco

Area
  - Total: 114.22 km^{2} (44.10 sq mi)
- Elevation: 482 m (1,581 ft)

Population (2022 Census)
  - Total: 12,263
  - Estimate (2025): 12,601
- Time zone: UTC−3 (BRT)

Barra de Guabiraba (Central northeastern portuguese pronunciation: [ˈbaha ˈdi ɡ͡wɐbiˈɾabɐ]) (Guabiraba Bar) is a city located in the state of Pernambuco, Brazil. It is located 132.6 km away from Recife, capital of the state of Pernambuco. The city has an estimated (2022 Census) population of 12,263 inhabitants.

== Geography ==
- State - Pernambuco
- Region - Agreste Pernambucano
- Boundaries - Gravatá and Sairé (N); Bonito (S and W); Cortês (E)
- Area - 114.22 km^{2}
- Elevation - 482 m
- Hydrography - Sirinhaém and Una rivers
- Vegetation - Subperenifólia forest
- Clima - hot and humid
- Annual average temperature - 23.0 c
- Distance to Recife - 132.6 km

== Economy ==
The main economic activities in Barra de Guabiraba are based in industry and agribusiness, especially manioc, sugarcane, passion fruits; and livestock such as cattle and poultry.

=== Economic indicators ===
Population	GDP x(1000 R$).	GDP pc (R$)	PE
13,623	38,031	2,997	0.064%

Economy by Sector 2006

Primary sector	Secondary sector	Service sector
15.14%	12.07%	72.79%

=== Health indicators ===
HDI (2000)	Hospitals (2007)	Hospitals beds (2007)	Children's Mortality every 1000 (2005)
0.554	1	12	17.3

== See also ==
- List of municipalities in Pernambuco
