= Escada, Pernambuco =

Municipality of Pernambuco, Brazil

Escada
- City
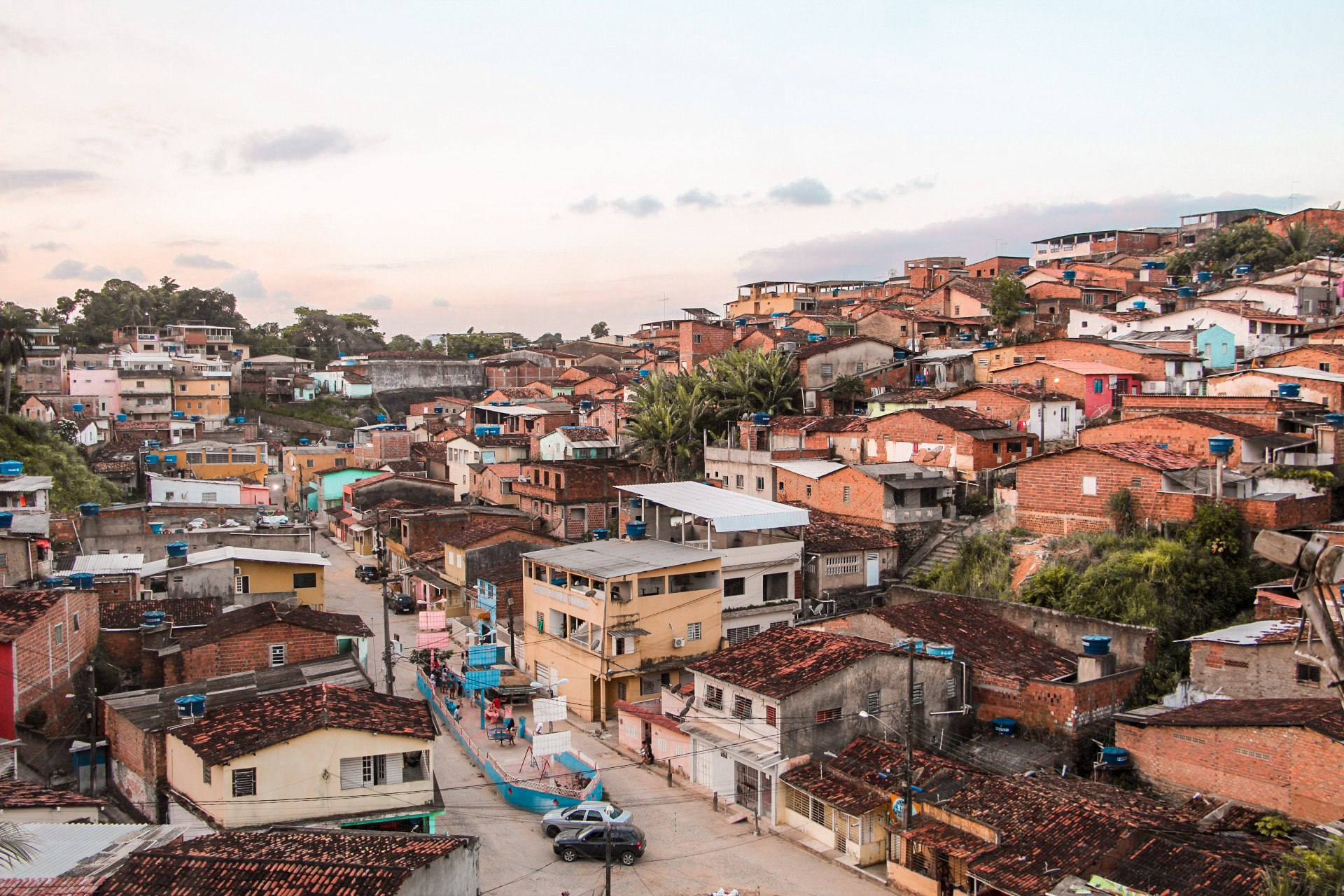

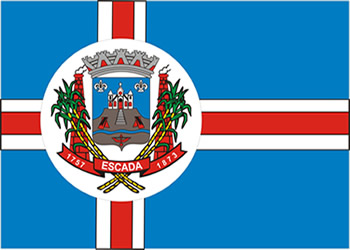
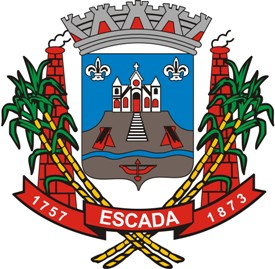
- Flag Coat of arms

- Escada Located in Brazil Map
- Coordinates: 8°21′33″S 35°13′25″W
- Country: Brazil
- State: Pernambuco
- Region: Zona da mata

Area
  - Total: 347.2 km^{2} (134.1 sq mi)
- Elevation: 109 m (358 ft)

Population (2022 Census)
  - Total: 59 836
  - Estimate (2025): 62,174
- Time zone: UTC−3 (BRT)
- Average Temperature: 25 C

Escada (Central northeastern portuguese pronunciation: [isˈkɐdɐ]) is a city in northeastern Brazil, in the State of Pernambuco, with 59 836 inhabitants according with IBGE 2022. It is the most populous municipality in its microregion and one of the main ones in the Microregion of the Southern Forest of Pernambuco. It is located at a distance of 60 km from the capital of Pernambuco, Recife. Known as "Princesa dos Canaviais", a nickname that refers to the large plantations and sugar cane mills installed in the region.

== Geography ==
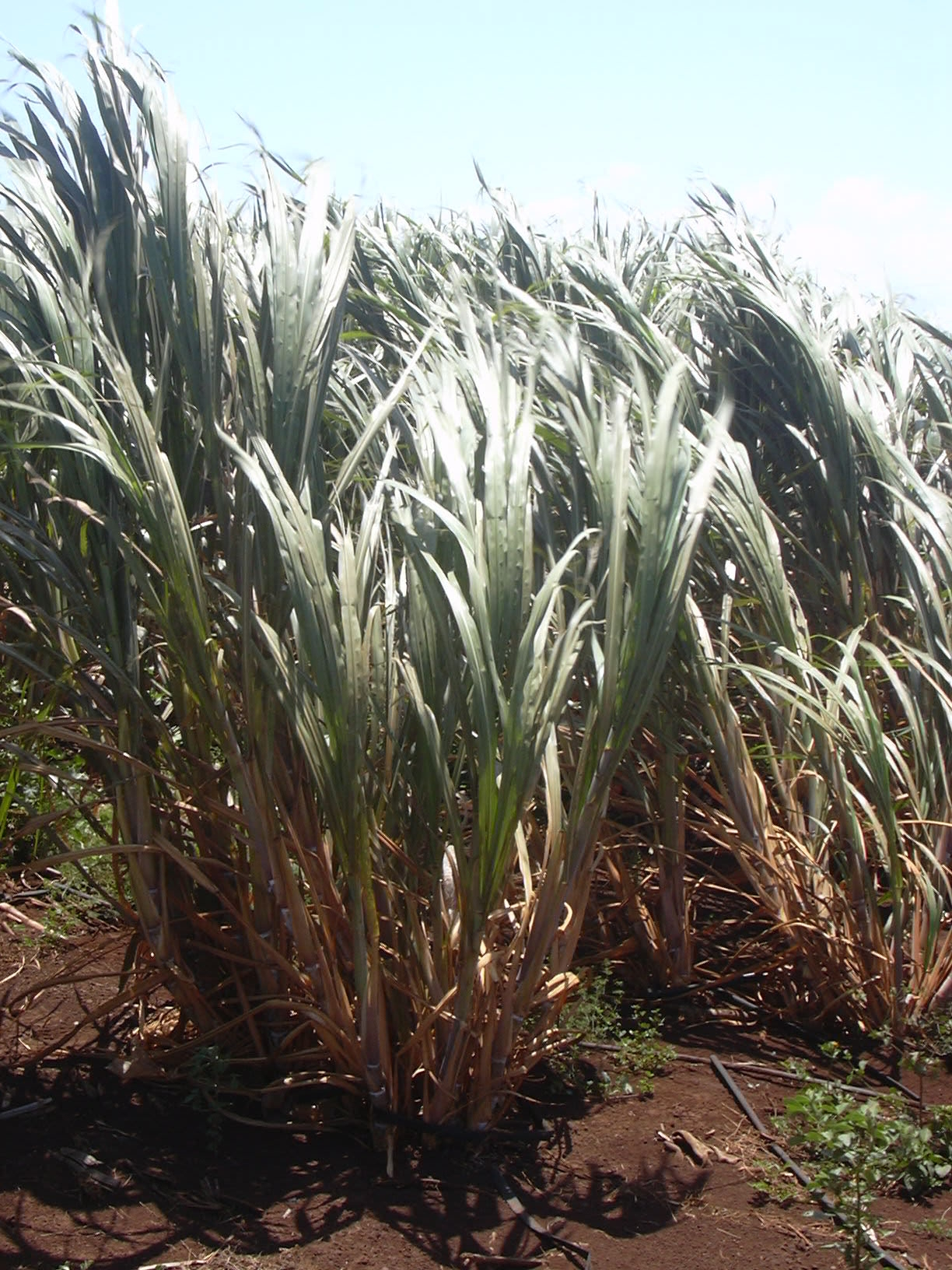
Sugarcane plantation in Escada

- State - Pernambuco
- Region - Zona da mata Pernambucana
- Boundaries - Cabo de Santo Agostinho and Vitória de Santo Antão (N); Sirinhaém and Ribeirão (S); Primavera (W); Ipojuca (E)
- Area - 347.2 km^{2}
- Elevation - 109 m
- Hydrography - Ipojuca and Sirinhaém rivers
- Vegetation - Subperenifólia forest
- Climate - Hot tropical and humid
- Annual average temperature - 25 c
- Distance to Recife - 59 km

== Economy ==
The main economic activities in Escada are based in general commerce and primary sector especially sugarcane with 384.000 tons of production in 2007.

=== Economic Indicators ===
Population	GDP x(1000 R$).	GDP pc (R$)	PE
62.604	233.562	3.902	0.39%

Economy by Sector 2006

Primary sector	Secondary sector	Service sector
7.34%	18.80%	73.86%

=== Health Indicators ===
HDI (2000)	Hospitals (2007)	Hospitals beds (2007)	Children's Mortality every 1000 (2005)
0.645	2	168	18.6

== See also ==
- List of municipalities in Pernambuco
