= Sirinhaém =

Municipality of Pernambuco, Brazil

- Municipality
- The Municipality of Sirinhaém
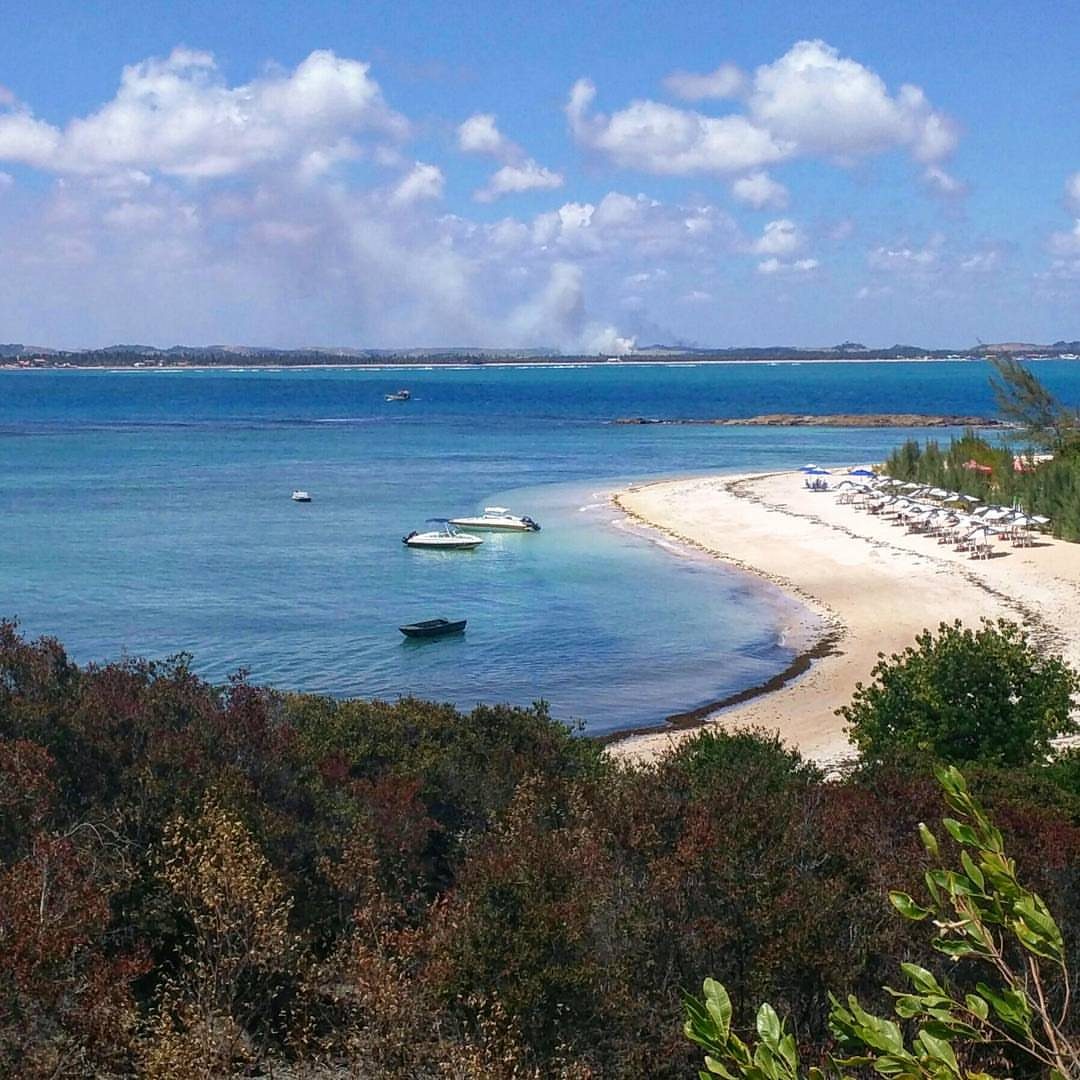
- Santo Aleixo Island

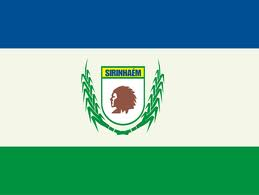
- Flag Coat of arms

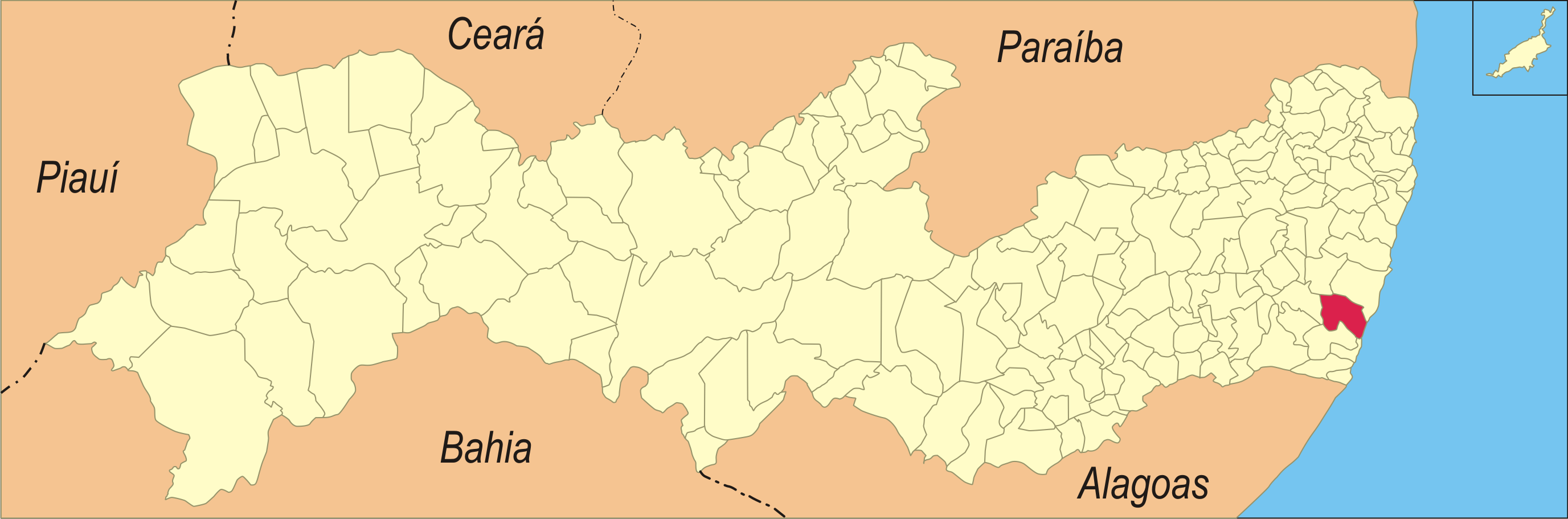
- Location in Pernambuco

- Location in Brazil
- Coordinates: 8°35′41″S 35°06′50″W
- Country: Brazil
- Region: Northeast
- State: Pernambuco
- Founded: June 12, 1614

Government
  - Mayor: Camila Machado Leocadio Lins Dos Santos (PP, 2021 – 2024)

Area
  - Total: 378.790 km^{2} (146.252 sq mi)
- Elevation: 49 m (161 ft)

Population (2022 Census)
  - Total: 37,596
  - Estimate (2025): 39,171
  - Density: 99.253/km^{2} (257.06/sq mi)
- Time zone: UTC−3 (BRT)
- Postal Code: 55580-000
- HDI (2010): 0.597 – low

Sirinhaém (Central northeastern portuguese pronunciation: [siɾĩj̃ɐˈẽj̃]) is a municipality in Pernambuco with 39,171 inhabitants (2025). The town was founded in 1614 making it among the oldest in the state. The Mayor is Camila Machado Leocadio Lins Dos Santos (PP, 2021 – 2024).

== Access ==
BR-101, PE-060, PE-064 (via Cabo de Santo Agostinho)

== Geography ==
- State - Pernambuco
- Region - RMR (Recife)
- Boundaries - Ipojuca and Escada (N); Rio Formoso and Tamandaré (S); Ribeirão (W); Atlantic Ocean (E)
- Area - 378.8 km^{2}
- Elevation - 49 m
- Vegetation - Forest Subperenifólia and Coconut trees
- Climate - Hot tropical and humid
- Mean and high annual temperatures - 20.1 °C; 29.5 °C
- Distance to Recife - 65 km

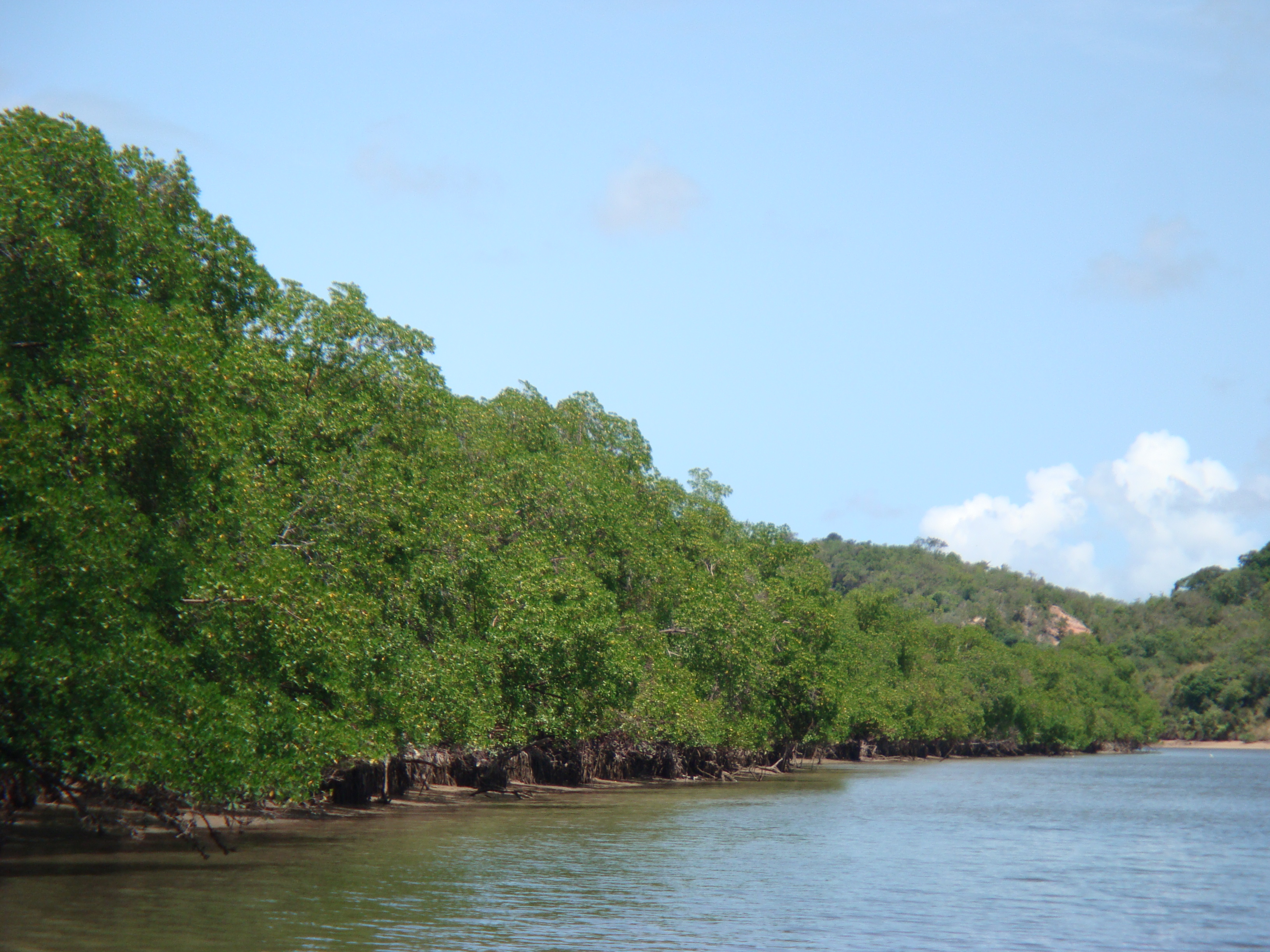
Mangroves at Sirinhaém

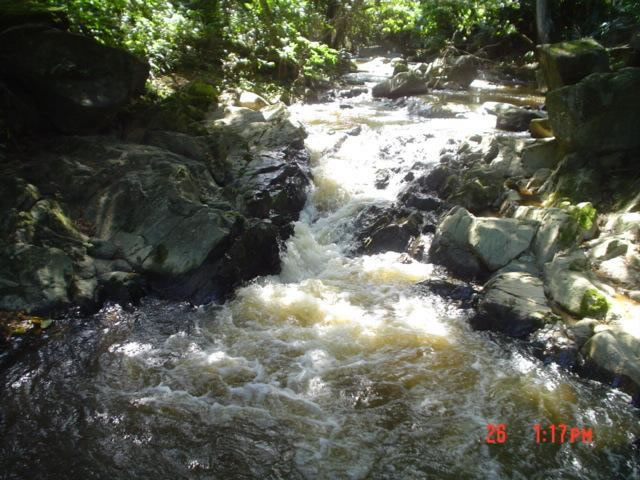
Stream in Sirinhaém

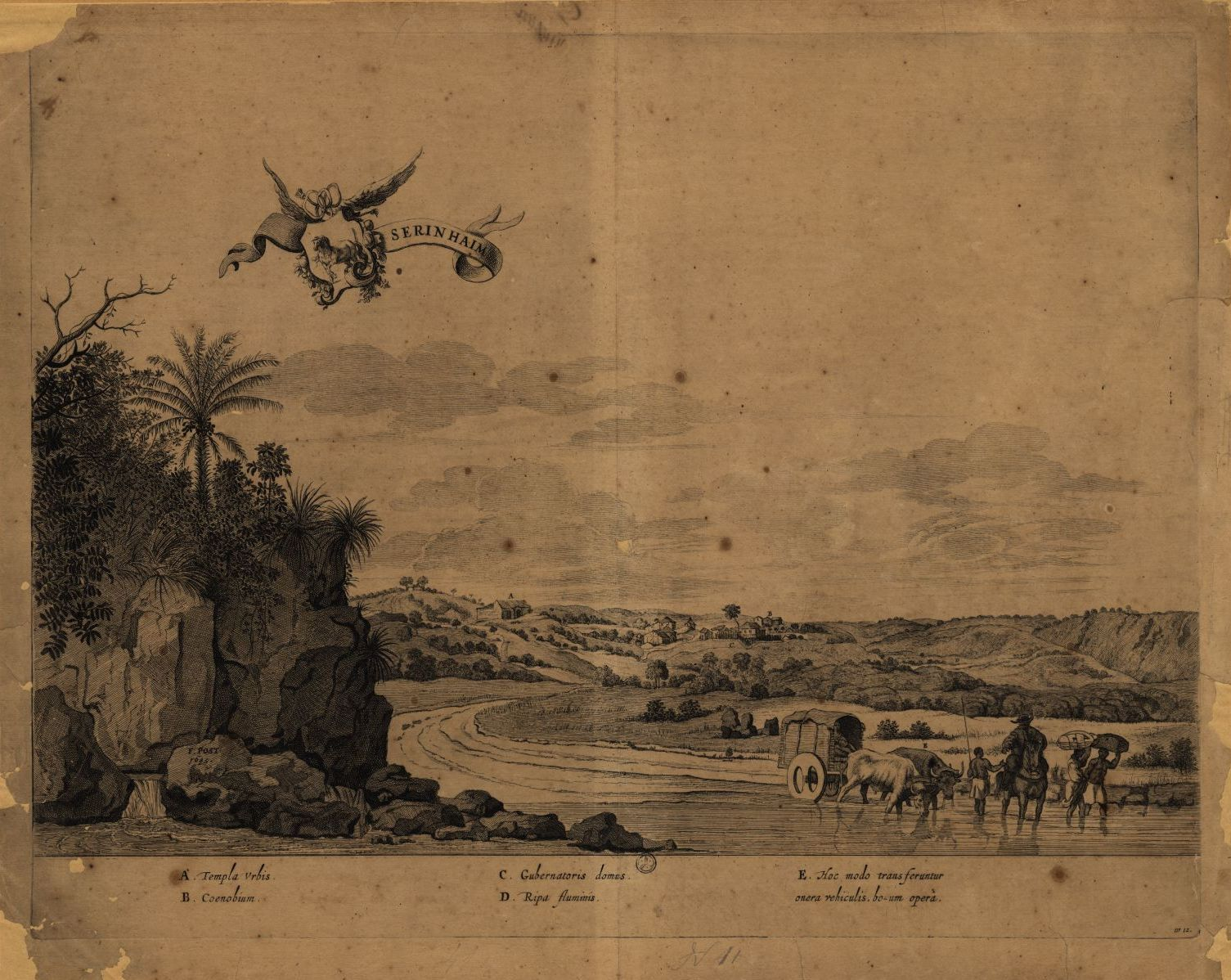
Engraving by Frans Jansz (1645), depicting Sirinhaém

== Beaches ==
- Gamela beach

Beach of clear water, reefs and extensive areas of coconut trees. It has some bars and Palhoças (tents) offering typical food of the region (based in fish and seafood).

- Guadalupe beach

Still almost virgin in its 3 kilometers long. Its part of the Gold Coast Project, created to develop in a planned and environmentally way the potential of one extensive coast area since Cabo de Santo Agostinho until Maragogi in Alagoas.

- Barra de Sirinhaém beach

Fluvial - marine beach, is largely used to practice water sports. With six kilometers long, has several sections where bathing is not recommended, due to the violence of the waves.

- Ilha de Santo Aleixo - Sirinhaém

== Economy ==
The main economic activities in Sirinhaém are based in food and beverage industry, commerce, some tourism and agriculture especially coconuts.

=== Economic indicators ===
Population	GDP x(1000 R$).	GDP pc (R$)	PE
43.036	183.646	4.817	0.28%

Economy by Sector, 2008

Primary sector	Secondary sector	Service sector
17,33%	27.23%	55.43%

=== Health indicators ===
HDI (2010)	Hospitals (2007)	Hospitals beds (2007)	Children's Mortality every 1000 (2005)
0.597	3	98	25

== Distances from Sirinhaém ==
São Paulo 2069 km	Rio de Janeiro 1813 km	Salvador, Bahia 613 km
Brasília 1607 km	Fortaleza 662 km	Belo Horizonte 1571 km
Curitiba 2401 km	Manaus 2824 km	Recife 65 km mais próxima
Porto Alegre 2918 km	Belém 1683 km	Goiânia 1779 km

== See also ==
- List of municipalities in Pernambuco
