= List of municipalities in Pernambuco =

This is a list of the municipalities in the state of Pernambuco (PE), located in the Northeast Region of Brazil. Pernambuco is divided into 184 municipalities (plus the state district of Fernando de Noronha), which are grouped into 19 microregions, which are grouped into 5 mesoregions.

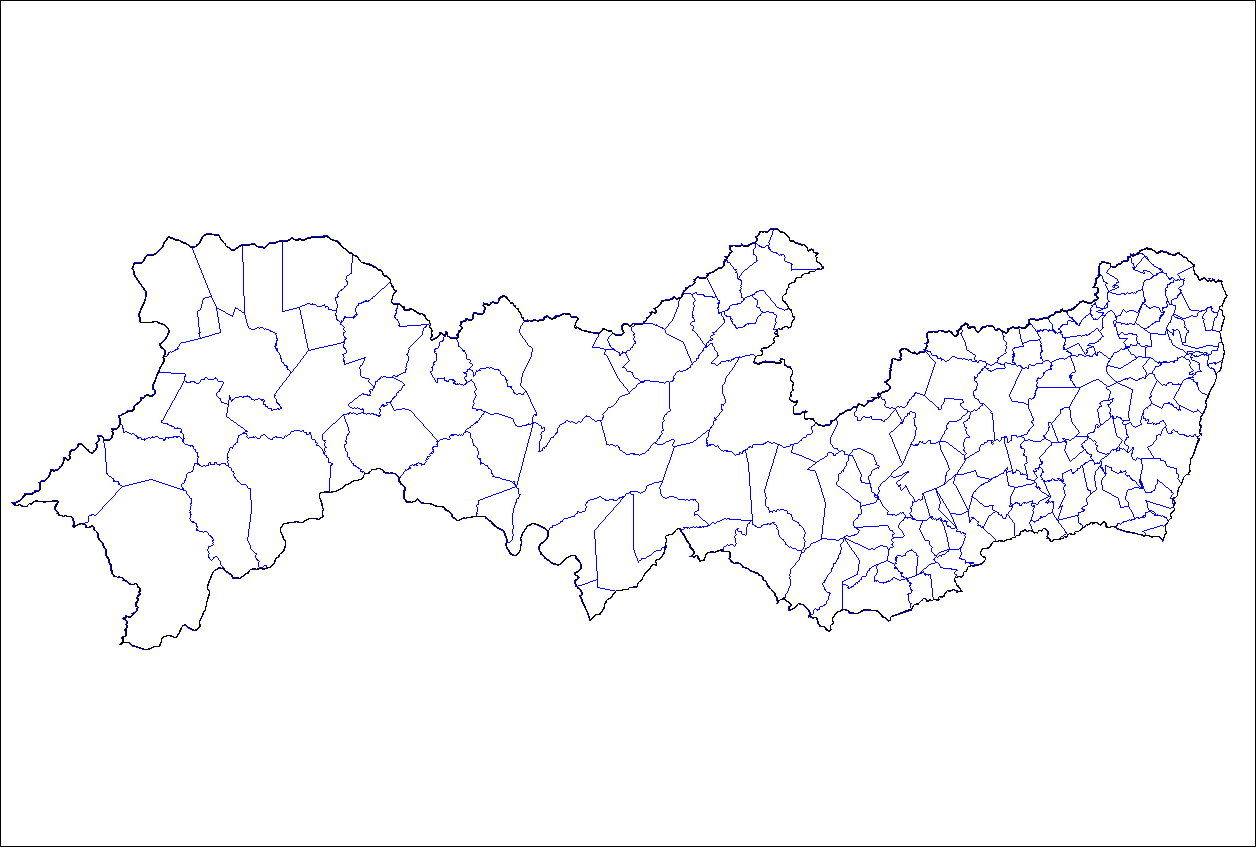
Municipalities of Pernambuco, Brazil (Fernando de Noronha not shown)

Mesoregion	Microregion	Municipality
Agreste Pernambucano	Alto Capibaribe	Casinhas
Agreste Pernambucano	Alto Capibaribe	Frei Miguelinho
Agreste Pernambucano	Alto Capibaribe	Santa Cruz do Capibaribe
Agreste Pernambucano	Alto Capibaribe	Santa Maria do Cambucá
Agreste Pernambucano	Alto Capibaribe	Surubim
Agreste Pernambucano	Alto Capibaribe	Taquaritinga do Norte
Agreste Pernambucano	Alto Capibaribe	Toritama
Agreste Pernambucano	Alto Capibaribe	Vertente do Lério
Agreste Pernambucano	Alto Capibaribe	Vertentes
Agreste Pernambucano	Brejo Pernambucano	Agrestina
Agreste Pernambucano	Brejo Pernambucano	Altinho
Agreste Pernambucano	Brejo Pernambucano	Barra de Guabiraba
Agreste Pernambucano	Brejo Pernambucano	Bonito
Agreste Pernambucano	Brejo Pernambucano	Camocim de São Félix
Agreste Pernambucano	Brejo Pernambucano	Cupira
Agreste Pernambucano	Brejo Pernambucano	Ibirajuba
Agreste Pernambucano	Brejo Pernambucano	Lagoa dos Gatos
Agreste Pernambucano	Brejo Pernambucano	Panelas
Agreste Pernambucano	Brejo Pernambucano	Sairé
Agreste Pernambucano	Brejo Pernambucano	São Joaquim do Monte
Agreste Pernambucano	Garanhuns	Angelim
Agreste Pernambucano	Garanhuns	Bom Conselho
Agreste Pernambucano	Garanhuns	Brejão
Agreste Pernambucano	Garanhuns	Caetés
Agreste Pernambucano	Garanhuns	Calçado
Agreste Pernambucano	Garanhuns	Canhotinho
Agreste Pernambucano	Garanhuns	Correntes
Agreste Pernambucano	Garanhuns	Garanhuns
Agreste Pernambucano	Garanhuns	Iati
Agreste Pernambucano	Garanhuns	Jucati
Agreste Pernambucano	Garanhuns	Jupi
Agreste Pernambucano	Garanhuns	Jurema
Agreste Pernambucano	Garanhuns	Lagoa do Ouro
Agreste Pernambucano	Garanhuns	Lajedo
Agreste Pernambucano	Garanhuns	Palmeirina
Agreste Pernambucano	Garanhuns	Paranatama
Agreste Pernambucano	Garanhuns	Saloá
Agreste Pernambucano	Garanhuns	São João
Agreste Pernambucano	Garanhuns	Terezinha
Agreste Pernambucano	Médio Capibaribe	Bom Jardim
Agreste Pernambucano	Médio Capibaribe	Cumaru
Agreste Pernambucano	Médio Capibaribe	Feira Nova
Agreste Pernambucano	Médio Capibaribe	João Alfredo
Agreste Pernambucano	Médio Capibaribe	Limoeiro
Agreste Pernambucano	Médio Capibaribe	Machados
Agreste Pernambucano	Médio Capibaribe	Orobó
Agreste Pernambucano	Médio Capibaribe	Passira
Agreste Pernambucano	Médio Capibaribe	Salgadinho
Agreste Pernambucano	Médio Capibaribe	São Vicente Ferrer
Agreste Pernambucano	Vale do Ipanema	Águas Belas
Agreste Pernambucano	Vale do Ipanema	Buíque
Agreste Pernambucano	Vale do Ipanema	Itaíba
Agreste Pernambucano	Vale do Ipanema	Pedra
Agreste Pernambucano	Vale do Ipanema	Tupanatinga
Agreste Pernambucano	Vale do Ipanema	Venturosa
Agreste Pernambucano	Vale do Ipojuca	Alagoinha
Agreste Pernambucano	Vale do Ipojuca	Belo Jardim
Agreste Pernambucano	Vale do Ipojuca	Bezerros
Agreste Pernambucano	Vale do Ipojuca	Brejo da Madre de Deus
Agreste Pernambucano	Vale do Ipojuca	Cachoeirinha
Agreste Pernambucano	Vale do Ipojuca	Capoeiras
Agreste Pernambucano	Vale do Ipojuca	Caruaru
Agreste Pernambucano	Vale do Ipojuca	Gravatá
Agreste Pernambucano	Vale do Ipojuca	Jataúba
Agreste Pernambucano	Vale do Ipojuca	Pesqueira
Agreste Pernambucano	Vale do Ipojuca	Poção
Agreste Pernambucano	Vale do Ipojuca	Riacho das Almas
Agreste Pernambucano	Vale do Ipojuca	Sanharó
Agreste Pernambucano	Vale do Ipojuca	São Bento do Una
Agreste Pernambucano	Vale do Ipojuca	São Caetano
Agreste Pernambucano	Vale do Ipojuca	Tacaimbó
Mata Pernambucana	Mata Meridional Pernambucana	Água Preta
Mata Pernambucana	Mata Meridional Pernambucana	Amaraji
Mata Pernambucana	Mata Meridional Pernambucana	Barreiros
Mata Pernambucana	Mata Meridional Pernambucana	Belém de Maria
Mata Pernambucana	Mata Meridional Pernambucana	Catende
Mata Pernambucana	Mata Meridional Pernambucana	Cortês
Mata Pernambucana	Mata Meridional Pernambucana	Escada
Mata Pernambucana	Mata Meridional Pernambucana	Gameleira
Mata Pernambucana	Mata Meridional Pernambucana	Jaqueira
Mata Pernambucana	Mata Meridional Pernambucana	Joaquim Nabuco
Mata Pernambucana	Mata Meridional Pernambucana	Maraial
Mata Pernambucana	Mata Meridional Pernambucana	Palmares
Mata Pernambucana	Mata Meridional Pernambucana	Primavera
Mata Pernambucana	Mata Meridional Pernambucana	Quipapá
Mata Pernambucana	Mata Meridional Pernambucana	Ribeirão
Mata Pernambucana	Mata Meridional Pernambucana	Rio Formoso
Mata Pernambucana	Mata Meridional Pernambucana	São Benedito do Sul
Mata Pernambucana	Mata Meridional Pernambucana	São José da Coroa Grande
Mata Pernambucana	Mata Meridional Pernambucana	Sirinhaém
Mata Pernambucana	Mata Meridional Pernambucana	Tamandaré
Mata Pernambucana	Mata Meridional Pernambucana	Xexéu
Mata Pernambucana	Mata Setentrional Pernambucana	Aliança
Mata Pernambucana	Mata Setentrional Pernambucana	Buenos Aires
Mata Pernambucana	Mata Setentrional Pernambucana	Camutanga
Mata Pernambucana	Mata Setentrional Pernambucana	Carpina
Mata Pernambucana	Mata Setentrional Pernambucana	Condado
Mata Pernambucana	Mata Setentrional Pernambucana	Ferreiros
Mata Pernambucana	Mata Setentrional Pernambucana	Goiana
Mata Pernambucana	Mata Setentrional Pernambucana	Itambé
Mata Pernambucana	Mata Setentrional Pernambucana	Itaquitinga
Mata Pernambucana	Mata Setentrional Pernambucana	Lagoa do Carro
Mata Pernambucana	Mata Setentrional Pernambucana	Lagoa de Itaenga
Mata Pernambucana	Mata Setentrional Pernambucana	Macaparana
Mata Pernambucana	Mata Setentrional Pernambucana	Nazaré da Mata
Mata Pernambucana	Mata Setentrional Pernambucana	Paudalho
Mata Pernambucana	Mata Setentrional Pernambucana	Timbaúba
Mata Pernambucana	Mata Setentrional Pernambucana	Tracunhaém
Mata Pernambucana	Mata Setentrional Pernambucana	Vicência
Mata Pernambucana	Vitoria de Santo Antão	Chã de Alegria
Mata Pernambucana	Vitoria de Santo Antão	Chã Grande
Mata Pernambucana	Vitoria de Santo Antão	Glória do Goitá
Mata Pernambucana	Vitoria de Santo Antão	Pombos
Mata Pernambucana	Vitoria de Santo Antão	Vitória de Santo Antão
Metropolitana de Recife	Fernando de Noronha	Fernando de Noronha
Metropolitana de Recife	Itamaracá	Araçoiaba
Metropolitana de Recife	Itamaracá	Igarassu
Metropolitana de Recife	Itamaracá	Ilha de Itamaracá
Metropolitana de Recife	Itamaracá	Itapissuma
Metropolitana de Recife	Recife	Abreu e Lima
Metropolitana de Recife	Recife	Camaragibe
Metropolitana de Recife	Recife	Jaboatão dos Guararapes
Metropolitana de Recife	Recife	Moreno
Metropolitana de Recife	Recife	Olinda
Metropolitana de Recife	Recife	Paulista
Metropolitana de Recife	Recife	Recife (State Capital)
Metropolitana de Recife	Recife	São Lourenço da Mata
Metropolitana de Recife	Suape	Cabo de Santo Agostinho
Metropolitana de Recife	Suape	Ipojuca
São Francisco Pernambucano	Itaparica	Belém de São Francisco
São Francisco Pernambucano	Itaparica	Carnaubeira da Penha
São Francisco Pernambucano	Itaparica	Floresta
São Francisco Pernambucano	Itaparica	Itacuruba
São Francisco Pernambucano	Itaparica	Jatobá
São Francisco Pernambucano	Itaparica	Petrolândia
São Francisco Pernambucano	Itaparica	Tacaratu
São Francisco Pernambucano	Petrolina	Afrânio
São Francisco Pernambucano	Petrolina	Cabrobó
São Francisco Pernambucano	Petrolina	Dormentes
São Francisco Pernambucano	Petrolina	Lagoa Grande
São Francisco Pernambucano	Petrolina	Orocó
São Francisco Pernambucano	Petrolina	Petrolina
São Francisco Pernambucano	Petrolina	Santa Maria da Boa Vista
São Francisco Pernambucano	Petrolina	Terra Nova
Sertão Pernambucano	Araripina	Araripina
Sertão Pernambucano	Araripina	Bodocó
Sertão Pernambucano	Araripina	Exu
Sertão Pernambucano	Araripina	Granito
Sertão Pernambucano	Araripina	Ipubi
Sertão Pernambucano	Araripina	Moreilândia
Sertão Pernambucano	Araripina	Ouricuri
Sertão Pernambucano	Araripina	Santa Cruz
Sertão Pernambucano	Araripina	Santa Filomena
Sertão Pernambucano	Araripina	Trindade
Sertão Pernambucano	Pajeú	Afogados da Ingazeira
Sertão Pernambucano	Pajeú	Brejinho
Sertão Pernambucano	Pajeú	Calumbi
Sertão Pernambucano	Pajeú	Carnaíba
Sertão Pernambucano	Pajeú	Flores
Sertão Pernambucano	Pajeú	Iguaraci
Sertão Pernambucano	Pajeú	Ingazeira
Sertão Pernambucano	Pajeú	Itapetim
Sertão Pernambucano	Pajeú	Quixaba
Sertão Pernambucano	Pajeú	Santa Cruz da Baixa Verde
Sertão Pernambucano	Pajeú	Santa Terezinha
Sertão Pernambucano	Pajeú	São José do Egito
Sertão Pernambucano	Pajeú	Serra Talhada
Sertão Pernambucano	Pajeú	Solidão
Sertão Pernambucano	Pajeú	Tabira
Sertão Pernambucano	Pajeú	Triunfo
Sertão Pernambucano	Pajeú	Tuparetama
Sertão Pernambucano	Salgueiro	Cedro
Sertão Pernambucano	Salgueiro	Mirandiba
Sertão Pernambucano	Salgueiro	Parnamirim
Sertão Pernambucano	Salgueiro	Salgueiro
Sertão Pernambucano	Salgueiro	São José do Belmonte
Sertão Pernambucano	Salgueiro	Serrita
Sertão Pernambucano	Salgueiro	Verdejante
Sertão Pernambucano	Sertão do Moxotó	Arcoverde
Sertão Pernambucano	Sertão do Moxotó	Betânia
Sertão Pernambucano	Sertão do Moxotó	Custódia
Sertão Pernambucano	Sertão do Moxotó	Ibimirim
Sertão Pernambucano	Sertão do Moxotó	Inajá
Sertão Pernambucano	Sertão do Moxotó	Manari
Sertão Pernambucano	Sertão do Moxotó	Sertânia

== See also ==
- Geography of Brazil
- List of cities in Brazil
