= Meio-Norte =

- The Subregions of Northeast Brazil; 1 • Meio-Norte, 2 • Sertão, 3 • Agreste, 4 • Zona da Mata
- Country: Brazil

The Meio-Norte (Portuguese pronunciation: [ˈmeju ˈnɔʁtʃi], mid-north) is one of the four sub-regions of Northeast Brazil, encompassing the territory of Maranhão and the western half of Piauí. The sub-region contains two of the nine capitals of the Northeast Brazil region, Teresina and São Luís. The Region is a climatic transition area located between the equatorial Amazon and semi-arid hinterlands.

Due to the region's great variation in the amount of rainfall, agriculture is limited to the cultivation of rice in Maranhão and the raising of cattle in Piauí, in areas of cerrado. Due to its climate, vegetation is typically composed of palm trees like babassu and carnauba (Forest of Cocais).

Due to the local diversity of plant species and the threat of deforestation caused by livestock grazing and plantation expansion, there is an action plan for the preservation of plant species in the region.
