= Ipojuca River =

River in Pernambuco, Brazil

- Location of mouth

Location
- Country: Brazil
- State: Pernambuco

Physical characteristics
- Source
  - location: Pernambuco state
- Mouth
  - location: Atlantic Ocean
  - coordinates: 8°24′39″S 34°58′04″W
  - elevation: 0 m (0 ft)

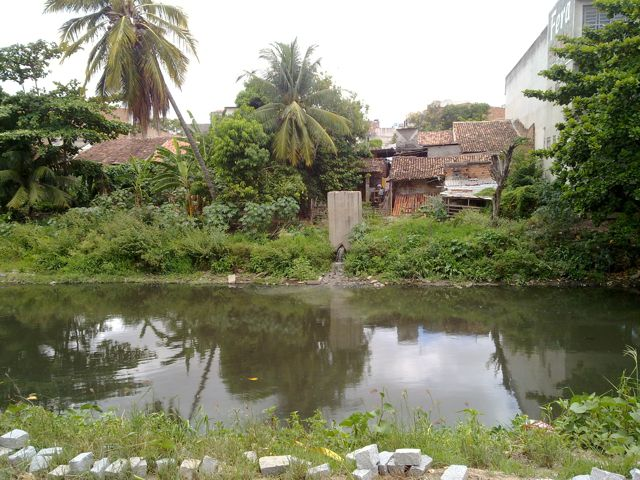

The Ipojuca River is a river of Pernambuco state in eastern Brazil.

== See also ==
- List of rivers of Pernambuco
