= Sirinhaém River =

River in Pernambuco, Brazil

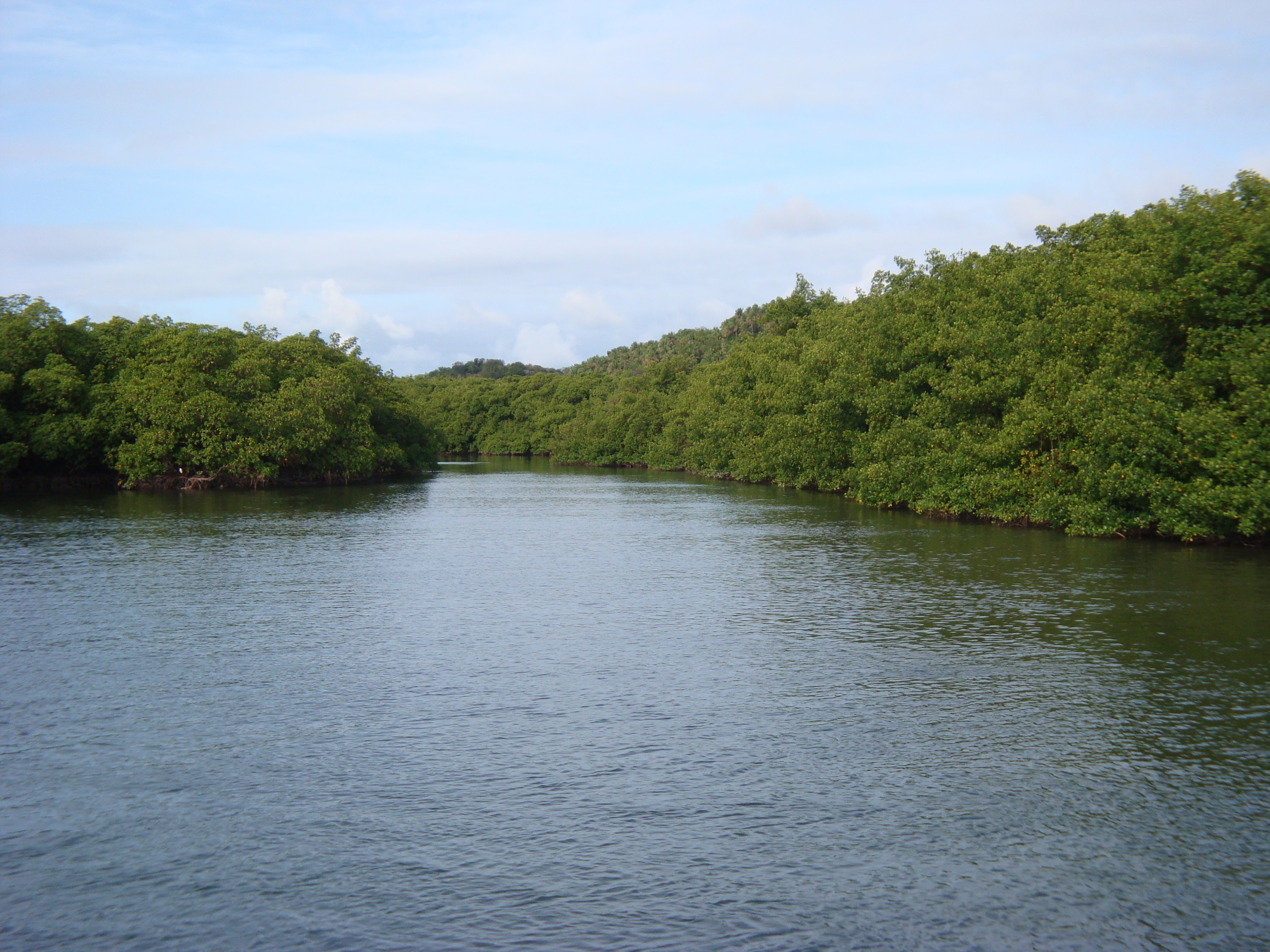

- Location of mouth

Location
- Country: Brazil
- State: Pernambuco

Physical characteristics
- Source
  - location: Pernambuco state
- Mouth
  - location: Atlantic Ocean
  - coordinates: 8°36′40″S 35°02′45″W
  - elevation: 0 m (0 ft)

The Sirinhaém River is a river of Pernambuco state in eastern Brazil.

== See also ==
- List of rivers of Pernambuco
