= Zona da Mata =

- Coastal Plain
- The Subregions of Northeast Brazil; 1 • Meio-norte, 2 • Sertão, 3 • Agreste, 4 • Zona da Mata
- Coordinates: 21.1200°S 42.9428°W
- Country: Brazil

The Zona da Mata ([ˈzõnɐ da ˈmatɐ], "Forest Belt") is the narrow coastal plain between the Atlantic Ocean and the dry agreste and sertão regions in the northeastern Brazilian states of Maranhão, Piauí, Rio Grande do Norte, Paraíba, Pernambuco, Alagoas, Sergipe and Bahia.

The zona da mata consists of a narrow plain, generally about 50–100 km (31–62 mi) wide and very flat and low (below 100 m (330 ft) in elevation), below the northeastern edge of the Brazilian Highlands. The climate is tropical hot and wet (humid), with most rain coming from the southeasterly winds between April and July. Annual rainfall generally totals 1,300–2,000 mm (51–79 in), with averages in June as high as 300 mm (12 in).

Because the climate and soil of the zona da mata are excellent for the production of sugar cane, very little of the original Atlantic Rainforest vegetation remains. Most of the major cities of northeastern Brazil, including Recife, Salvador, Maceió, Aracaju and João Pessoa, are located in the zona da mata.
