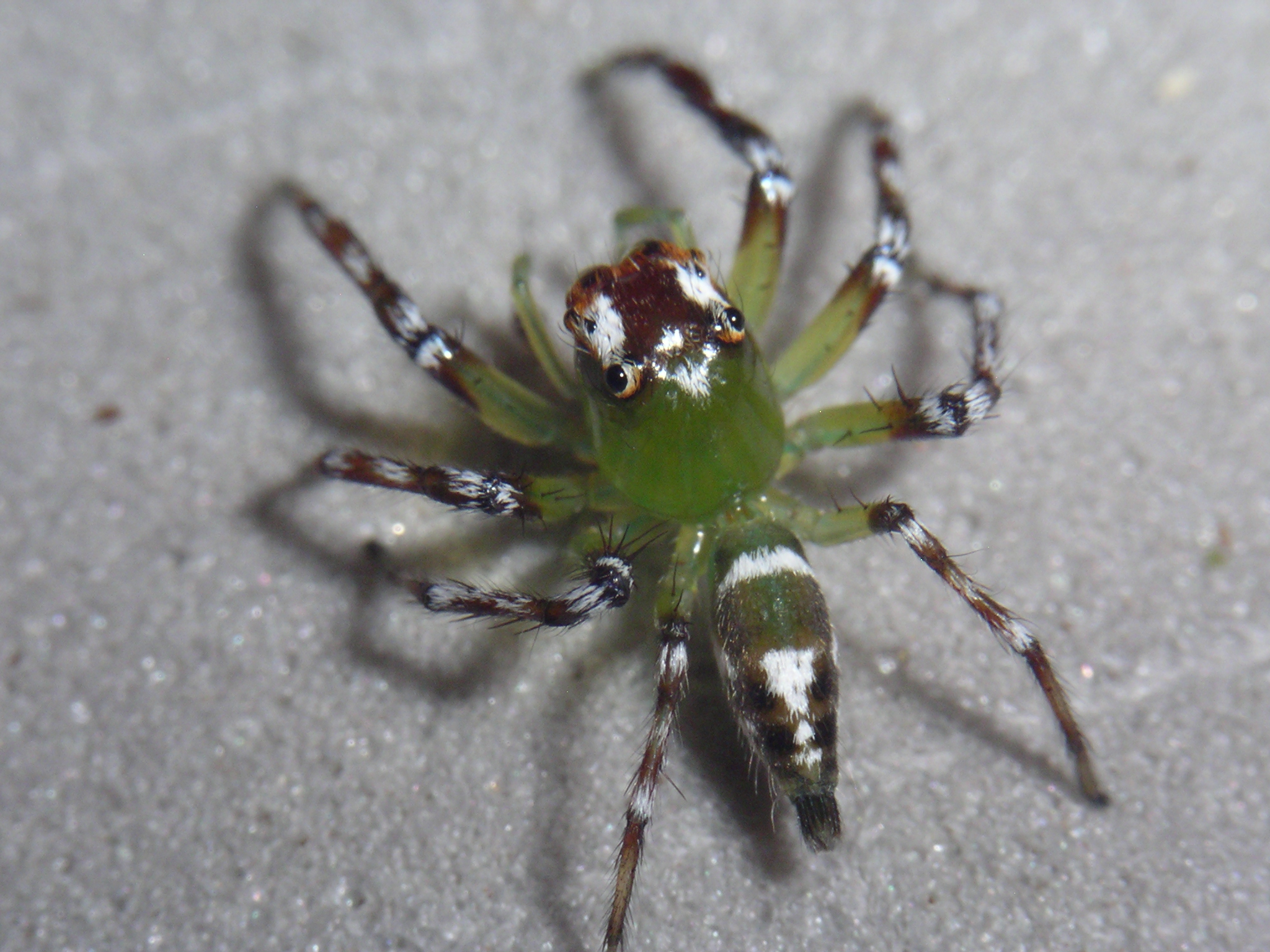
- Acragas longimanus

Scientific classification
- Kingdom: Animalia
- Phylum: Arthropoda
- Subphylum: Chelicerata
- Class: Arachnida
- Order: Araneae
- Infraorder: Araneomorphae
- Family: Salticidae
- Subfamily: Salticinae
- Tribe: Amycini; F.O. Pickard-Cambridge, 1900

Genera
- See text.

= Amycini =

Tribe of spiders

Amycini is a tribe of jumping spiders. It has been treated as the subfamily Amycinae.

== Genera ==
Wayne Maddison in 2015 placed the following genera in the tribe:

- Acragas Simon, 1900
- Amycus C. L. Koch, 1846
- Anaurus Simon, 1900
- Arnoliseus Braul, 2002
- Encolpius Simon, 1900
- Frespera Braul & Lise, 2002
- Hypaeus Simon, 1900
- Letoia Simon, 1900
- Macutula Ruiz, 2011
- Maenola Simon, 1900
- Mago O. P.-Cambridge, 1882
- Noegus Simon, 1900
- Vinnius Simon, 1902
