= Pseudamphidraus =

Genus of spiders

Pseudamphidraus is an obsolete spider genus of the jumping spider family, Salticidae. Both described species have only been found in Guyana. The genus was erected by Ludovico di Caporiacco in 1947.

P. niger Caporiacco, 1947 is now Noegus niger (Amycinae), P. variegatus Caporiacco, 1947 was moved to Marma nigritarsis (Amycoidea incertae sedis).

== Name ==
The genus name is combined of Greek pseudo "false" and the salticid genus name Amphidraus.
