= Pyrenula cinnabarina =

Scientific classification
- Domain: Eukaryota
- Kingdom: Fungi
- Division: Ascomycota
- Class: Eurotiomycetes
- Order: Pyrenulales
- Family: Pyrenulaceae
- Genus: Pyrenula
- Species: P. cinnabarina

Binomial name
- Pyrenula cinnabarina Aptroot, E.L.Lima & M.Cáceres (2014)

Species of lichen

Pyrenula cinnabarina is a species of corticolous (bark-dwelling), crustose lichen in the family Pyrenulaceae. Found in Brazil, this species is notable for its dark carmine-red thallus and its known as ascomata (fruiting bodies), which are grouped in clusters of 5–30. The ascospores, which are the spores produced within the asci, are 3-septate, meaning they are divided into four sections, and measure 12–15 μm by 6–7 μm.

The type specimen of Pyrenula cinnabarina was collected from Catimbau National Park in Buíque, Pernambuco, Brazil, at an elevation of about 880 m (2,890 ft). The thallus is thin, granular, and dark carmine red, lacking pseudocyphellae (small pores on the surface) and a prothallus (a border around the thallus). The ascomata are superficial (situated on the surface), globose (roughly spherical), 0.2–0.35 mm in diameter, and clustered in groups with fused walls but separate ostioles (openings). The walls of the ascomata are completely carbonised (blackened), and the ostioles are apical (at the top) and nearly white. The hamathecium, the tissue between the asci, does not contain oil droplets. The ascospores are brown, arranged in a single row within the asci, and have diamond-shaped internal cavities separated from the wall by a thick layer. Pyrenula cinnabarina does not have pycnidia (small asexual fruiting bodies). Chemically, the thallus reacts with potassium hydroxide (K+) to produce a crimson colour and shows an orange colour under ultraviolet light.

Pyrenula cinnabarina grows on smooth bark in undisturbed Caatinga forests and is only known to occur in Brazil. This species is very conspicuous in the field due to its bright red thallus. It is closely related to Pyrenula reginae, which grows in the same area, but differs mainly in that its hamathecium is inspersed (contains oil droplets).

== See also ==
- List of Pyrenula species
