= Kapinawá =

Indigenous people of eastern Brazil

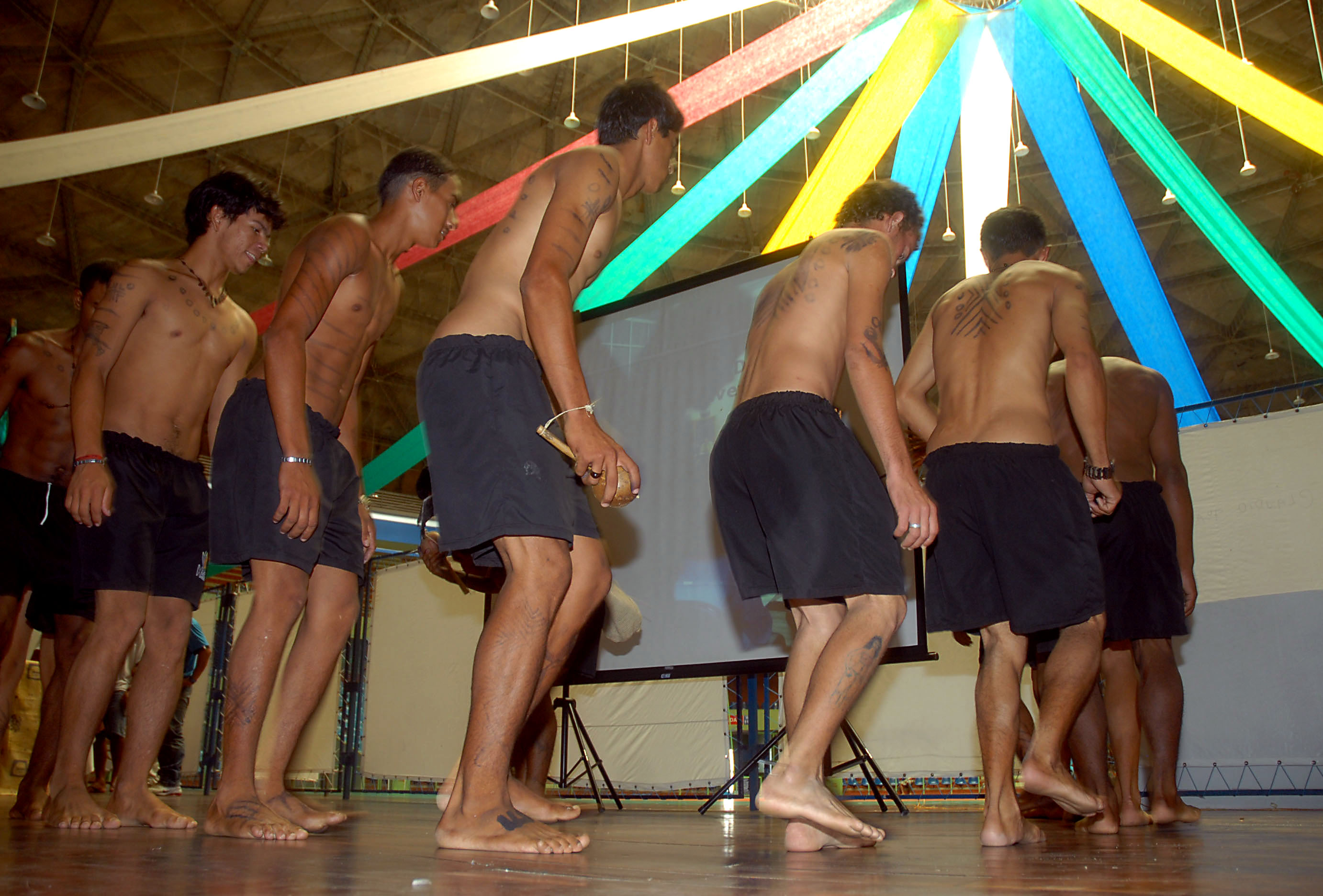
Kapinawá practicing the toré religion

Map of Buíque, Pernambuco, where the Kapinawâ live

The Kapinawâ are an Indigenous people of Buíque, Pernambuco in eastern Brazil. In addition to their primary residence in Buíque, they are also found in Tupanatinga and Ibimirim municipalities. They are descended from the historical Paratió, who were settled in the Aldeia do Macaco. They have been defending their territory from land-grabbers since the mid-1970s.
