= Marma wesolowskae =

Scientific classification
- Kingdom: Animalia
- Phylum: Arthropoda
- Subphylum: Chelicerata
- Class: Arachnida
- Order: Araneae
- Infraorder: Araneomorphae
- Family: Salticidae
- Genus: Marma
- Species: M. wesolowskae

Binomial name
- Marma wesolowskae Salgado & Ruiz, 2020

Species of spider

Marma wesolowskae is a species of jumping spider in the genus Marma that is endemic to Brazil. It has only been found in Pernambuco. First described in 2020 by Alexandre Salgado and Gustavo Ruiz, the spider is small, typically between 3.38 and 4.01 mm (0.133 and 0.158 in) in total length. The male is smaller than the female. The spider lives on sandstone and has generally a coloration that blends into the rock. The abdomen has a thick brown stripe down the middle of its back. The species can be distinguished from other members of the genus by its copulatory organs. The female has copulatory openings towards the back of the epigyne and a projecting border at the back of the eipigynal plate. The male has a long thin embolus and an embolic disc that differs from Marma nigritarsis, Marma pipa and Marma sinuosa.

== Taxonomy ==
Marma wesolowskae was first described by Alexandre Salgado and Gustavo Ruizin 2020. The species is named for the Polish arachnologist Wanda Wesołowska. It was allocated to the genus Marma, which itself had been first raised by Eugène Simon in 1902. Marma is part of the Amphidraus–Marma clade. In 2015, Wayne Maddison listed the genus in the tribe Euophryini. In 2017, the genus was grouped with 25 other genera of jumping spiders under the name Colonines.

== Description ==
The spider is small. The male has a typical total length of 3.38 mm (0.133 in). The brown carapace is 1.96 mm (0.077 in) long and 1.31 mm (0.052 in) wide, and covered in scales. The abdomen has a thick brown stripe down the middle of its back and pale edges. The chelicerae have two forward and one back teeth. The back tooth has more than one cusp. The legs have dark markings. The palpal bulb has an elongated retrolateral tibial apophysis that is reminiscent of a finger. The embolus is long, thing and has a curved end. The embolic disc is narrow and has a straight spike-like protrusion that extends as far as the embolus. The palpal bulb has orange scales.

The female is longer, with a typical length of 4.01 mm (0.158 in). It has a similar carapace, although larger at 1.9 mm (0.075 in) long and 1.43 mm (0.056 in) wide. The abdomen is also paler. The two copulatory openings are close to each other and to towards the back of the epigyne. The copulatory ducts are long and complex, circling around the spermathecae.

The spider is similar to the related Marma nigritarsis and Marma pipa. The spider shares attributes with these species, including the way that the spermathecae are circled by the copulatory ducts. The males have a narrower emobolc disc. Marma wesolowskae has its copulatory openings placed more to the back of the epigyne, and have a projecting border at the back of the eipigynal plate. It differs from Marma pechichon in that the copulatory ducts circle only once around the spermathecae. Marma sinuosa can be distinguished by the straight protrusion on the embolic disc on Marma wesolowskae. The orange scales on the palpal bulb are also unusual, the other species generally being white,

== Distribution and habitat ==
Marma wesolowskae is endemic to Brazil. The male holotype for the species was found in the Buíque in 2019. The female paratype was found nearby. The spider has only been found in Pernambuco. The species lives on sandstone. The spider's colours are similar to its environment, enabling it to hide on the rock.
