= Albionella =

Scientific classification
- Kingdom: Animalia
- Phylum: Arthropoda
- Subphylum: Chelicerata
- Class: Arachnida
- Order: Araneae
- Infraorder: Araneomorphae
- Family: Salticidae
- Genus: Albionella; Chickering, 1946
- Species: A. propria

Binomial name
- Albionella propria Chickering, 1946

Genus of spiders

Albionella is a genus of jumping spiders found in Panama.

As of October 2016, the World Spider Catalog recognizes only one species in the genus, Albionella propria. Two other species have previously been recognized: Albionella guianensis, regarded as a dubious name, and Albionella chickeringi, now placed in the genus Mago as Mago checkeringi.
