= Amphidraus =

Scientific classification
- Kingdom: Animalia
- Phylum: Arthropoda
- Subphylum: Chelicerata
- Class: Arachnida
- Order: Araneae
- Infraorder: Araneomorphae
- Family: Salticidae
- Subfamily: Salticinae
- Genus: Amphidraus; Simon, 1900

Type species
- Amphidraus auriga Simon, 1900

Species
- See text.

Genus of spiders

Amphidraus is a genus of South American jumping spiders first described by Eugène Simon in 1900. It was previously considered a synonym of Nebridia, but this was later rejected by Jerzy Prószyński, who claimed that merging the two genera was not supported by previous diagnostic drawings.

Members of this genus most closely resemble those of Marma and the monotypic genus Yacuitella. All three genera have a projection on the embolic disc that is independent from the embolus and a conductor on the distal retro-ventral region of the cymbium, though it is membranous in Amphidraus and Yacuitella and sclerotized in Marma. Spiders of Amphidraus can be distinguished from these other two by the presence of both a proximal tegular lobe and a cylindrical embolic filament that emerges from the distal region of the embolus shaft.

== Species ==
As of February 2019, the World Spider Catalog accepted the following species:

- Amphidraus araripe Salgado & Ruiz, 2019 – Brazil
- Amphidraus argentinensis Galiano, 1997 – Argentina
- Amphidraus auriga Simon, 1900 – Bolivia
- Amphidraus belzonte Salgado & Ruiz, 2017 – Brazil
- Amphidraus bifidus Salgado & Ruiz, 2017 – Brazil
- Amphidraus boxhica Galvis, 2017 – Colombia
- Amphidraus boomerang Salgado & Ruiz, 2019 – Brazil
- Amphidraus caziuanan Salgado & Ruiz, 2017 – Brazil
- Amphidraus chie Galvis, 2017 – Colombia
- Amphidraus colombianus Galvis, 2017 – Colombia
- Amphidraus complexus Zhang & Maddison, 2012 – Ecuador
- Amphidraus cornipalpis Salgado & Ruiz, 2019 – Brazil
- Amphidraus draconicaudatus Salgado & Ruiz, 2017 – Brazil
- Amphidraus draconitupan Salgado & Ruiz, 2019 – Brazil
- Amphidraus duckei Galiano, 1967 – Brazil
- Amphidraus guaitipan Galvis, 2017 – Colombia
- Amphidraus guatavita Galvis, 2017 – Colombia
- Amphidraus janauari Salgado & Ruiz, 2017 – Brazil
- Amphidraus loxodontillus Salgado & Ruiz, 2017 – Brazil
- Amphidraus mae Galvis, 2017 – Colombia
- Amphidraus manauara Salgado & Ruiz, 2019 – Brazil
- Amphidraus mysticetus Salgado & Ruiz, 2017 – Brazil
- Amphidraus nigrigenu Salgado & Ruiz, 2017 – Brazil
- Amphidraus pae Galvis, 2017 – Colombia
- Amphidraus pulvinus Salgado & Ruiz, 2017 – Brazil
- Amphidraus quimbaya Galvis, 2017 – Colombia
- Amphidraus quinini Galvis, 2017 – Colombia
- Amphidraus sacrificatus Salgado & Ruiz, 2019 – Brazil
- Amphidraus santanae Galiano, 1967 – Brazil
- Amphidraus shenlong Salgado & Ruiz, 2019 – Brazil
- Amphidraus sie Galvis, 2017 – Colombia
- Amphidraus sikuani Galvis, 2017 – Colombia
- Amphidraus simplex Salgado & Ruiz, 2017 – Brazil
- Amphidraus somondoco Galvis, 2017 – Colombia
- Amphidraus sotairensis Galvis, 2017 – Colombia
- Amphidraus sua Galvis, 2017 – Colombia
- Amphidraus tanimuca Galvis, 2017 – Colombia
- Amphidraus tisquesusa Galvis, 2017 – Colombia
- Amphidraus tundama Galvis, 2017 – Colombia
- Amphidraus zaque Galvis, 2017 – Colombia
- Amphidraus zipa Galvis, 2017 – Colombia
