= Matinta =

Scientific classification
- Kingdom: Animalia
- Phylum: Arthropoda
- Subphylum: Chelicerata
- Class: Arachnida
- Order: Araneae
- Infraorder: Araneomorphae
- Family: Salticidae
- Subfamily: Salticinae
- Genus: Matinta; Ruiz & Maddison, 2019

Type species
- M. acutidens (Simon, 1900)

Species
- 19, see text

Genus of spiders

Matinta is a genus of South American jumping spiders (family Salticidae). The largest number of species are found in Brazil.

== Taxonomy ==
Matinta was first described by G. R. S. Ruiz, Wayne Paul Maddison & María Elena Galiano in 2019. A re-examination of the holotype of the type species of the genus Mago showed that the genus had been misinterpreted, so that species had been included in the genus that did not fit the diagnosis. Accordingly, Ruiz et al. created a new genus, Matinta, to which most of the former Mago genera were transferred. Matinta, like Mago, was placed in the tribe Amycini, part of the Amycoida clade of the subfamily Salticinae.

=== Species ===
As of July 2019 it contains nineteen species, found in Ecuador, Brazil, Guyana, Peru, and French Guiana:

- Matinta acutidens (Simon, 1900) (type) – Brazil, Guyana
- Matinta apophysis (Costa & Ruiz, 2017) – Brazil
- Matinta balbina (Patello & Ruiz, 2014) – Brazil
- Matinta chickeringi (Caporiacco, 1954) – French Guiana
- Matinta delicata (Patello & Ruiz, 2014) – Brazil
- Matinta fasciata (Mello-Leitão, 1940) – Guyana
- Matinta fonsecai (Soares & Camargo, 1948) – Brazil
- Matinta furcata (Costa & Ruiz, 2017) – Ecuador
- Matinta jurutiensis (Patello & Ruiz, 2014) – Brazil
- Matinta longidens (Simon, 1900) – Brazil, French Guiana
- Matinta mimica (Costa & Ruiz, 2017) – Ecuador
- Matinta opiparis (Simon, 1900) – Brazil
- Matinta pardo (Costa & Ruiz, 2017) – Brazil
- Matinta procax (Simon, 1900) – Peru
- Matinta saperda (Simon, 1900) – Brazil
- Matinta silvae (Crane, 1943) – Guyana, French Guiana
- Matinta similis (Patello & Ruiz, 2014) – Brazil
- Matinta steindachneri (Taczanowski, 1878) – Peru, Brazil
- Matinta vicana (Simon, 1900) – Brazil
