= Catimbau National Park =

National park in Pernambuco, Brazil

- Parque Nacional do Catimbau
- IUCN category II (national park)
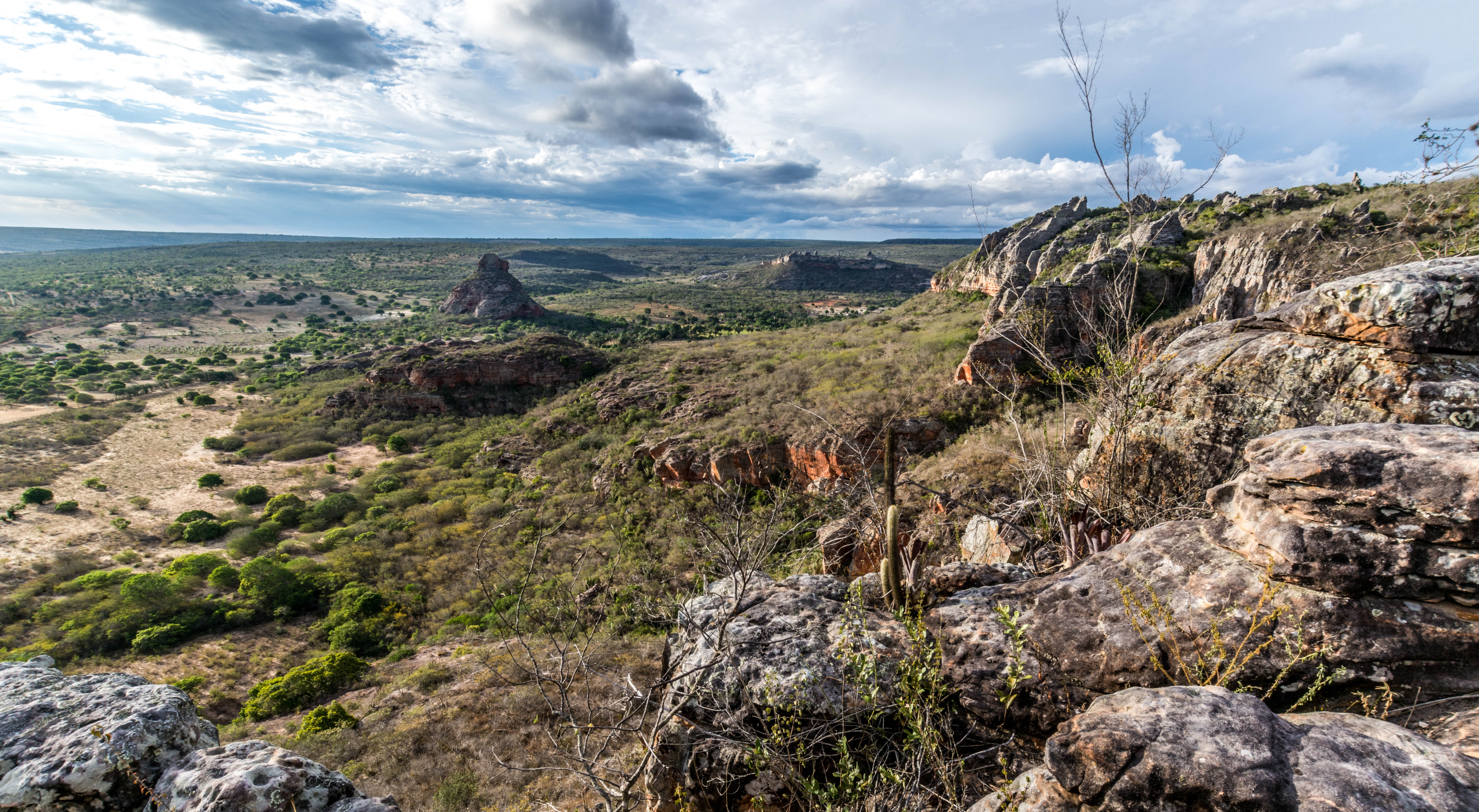
- Catimbau Valley- the 2nd largest Brazilian Archeological site]

- Location within Brazil
- Location: Near Buíque in the state of Pernambuco, Brazil
- Nearest city: Tupanatinga, Pernambuco
- Coordinates: 8.61667°S 37.15°W
- Area: 62,300 hectares (154,000 acres)
- Designation: National park
- Established: 2002
- Governing body: ICMBio

The Catimbau National Park (Portuguese: Parque Nacional do Catimbau) is a national park in the state of Pernambuco, Brazil. It protects a semi-arid area of caatinga with sandstone caverns and caves in which prehistoric art has been found.

== Location ==
Vale do Catimbau National Park is divided between the municipalities of Buíque (17.6%), Ibimirim (40.41%) and Tupanatinga (41.99%) in Pernambuco. It has an area of 62,300 hectares (154,000 acres). It lies to the south of highway BR-110 and the town of Cruzeiro do Nordesta. It adjoins the Kapinawá Indigenous Territory to the south.

The Catimbau Valley (Portuguese: Vale do Catimbau) is Brazil's 2nd largest archaeological site. Among its natural attractions there are beautiful canyons, over 2,000 caves, and 28 registered areas with pre-historical cave paintings. One of the sites, Pedra da Concha (Shell Rock), displays cave art dating at least 6,000 years ago. The park has been designated a national archaeological heritage site by the National Institute of Historic and Artistic Heritage (IPHAN).

== Environment ==
The park is in the caatinga biome. It is in the semi-arid region of Pernambuco in the transition between the agreste and sertão vegetation zones, which makes a mosaic of landscapes with high biodiversity. The sandstone walls and the Tacaratu Formation have been carved by wind and rain into different shapes with shades of color. There are indications that the region has considerable speleological potential.

The extreme north of the park has well-preserved caatinga, and is inaccessible, with the eastern portion better preserved than the west, with wetlands, cliffs and the main ecotourism trails. In the west there are small family farms with some irrigation, and some indigenous communities that lost land when the park was created.

== History ==
The Vale do Catimbau National Park was created on 13 December 2002 with an area of 62,294.14 hectares (153,932.2 acres). It is administered by the Chico Mendes Institute for Biodiversity Conservation (ICMBio). It is classed as IUCN protected area category II (national park), and has as its objectives preservation of natural ecosystems of great ecological relevance and scenic beauty, enabling the conduct of scientific research and the development of educational activities and environmental interpretation, recreation in contact with nature and ecological tourism.

The park encourages environmental research by federal higher educational institutions such as Federal University of Pernambuco, Federal Rural University of Pernambuco and Federal Institute of Pernambuco into the interaction between fauna and flora, the geology and the archaeology. The park became part of the Caatinga Ecological Corridor, created in May 2006.

== Gallery ==
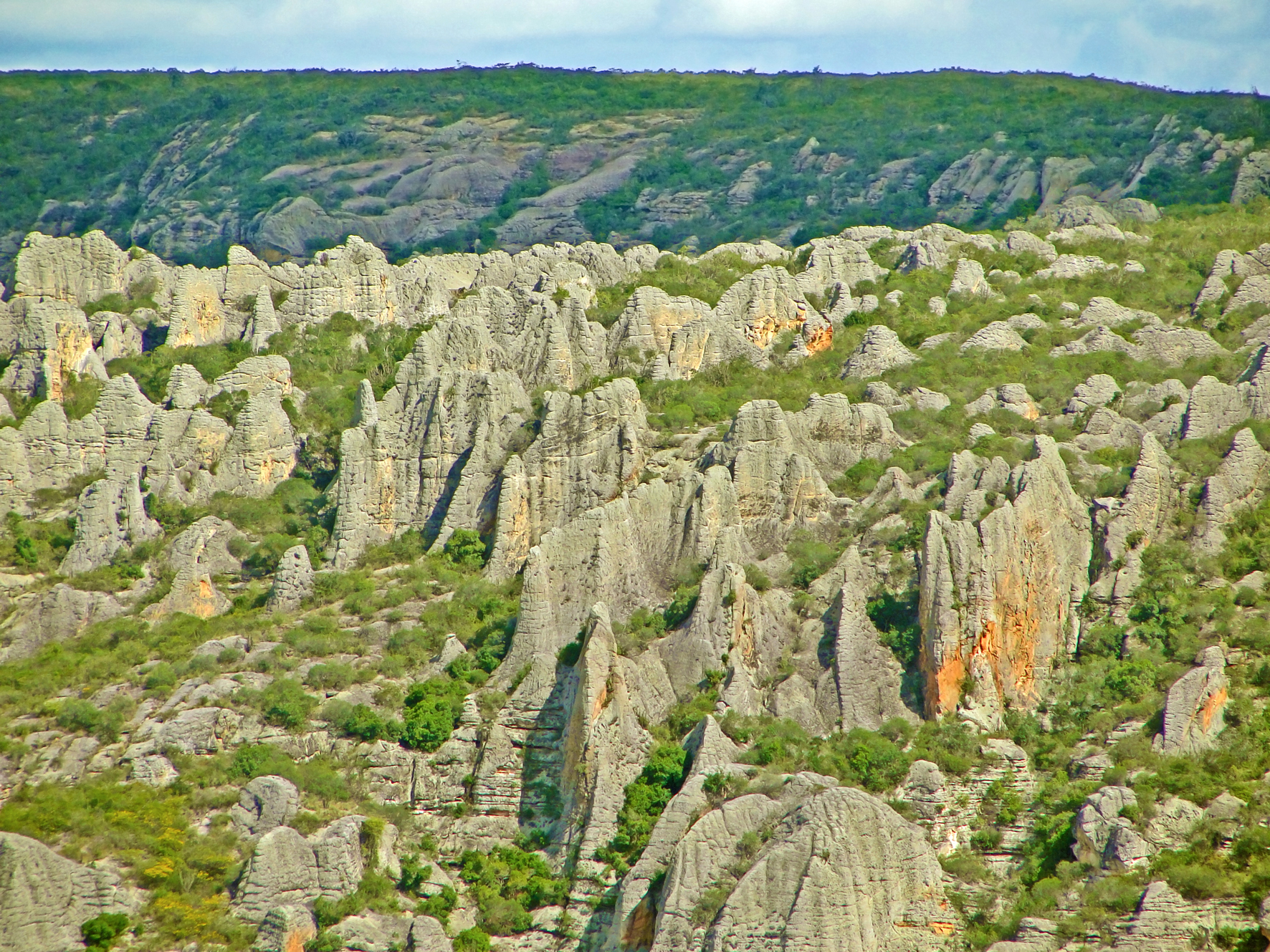

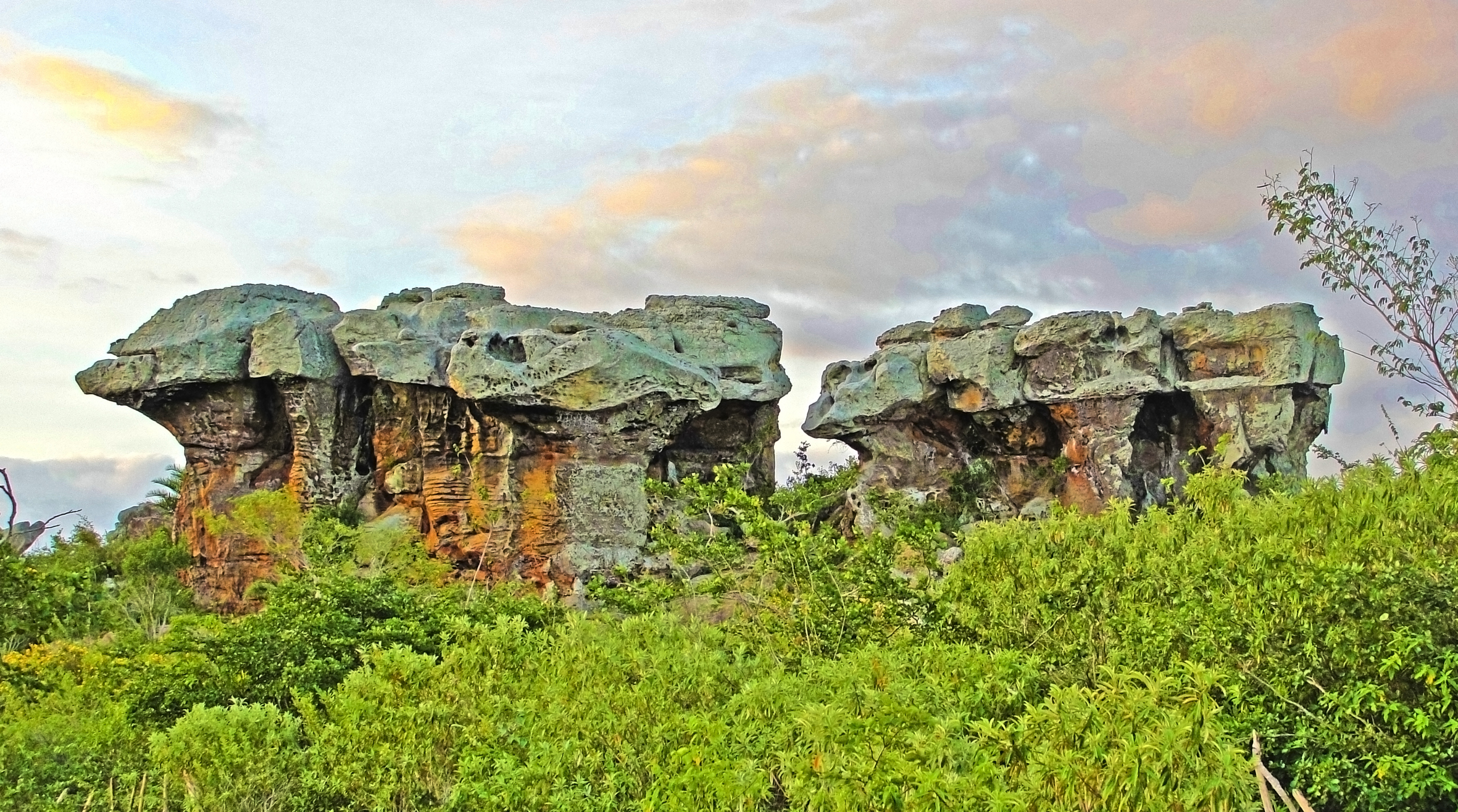

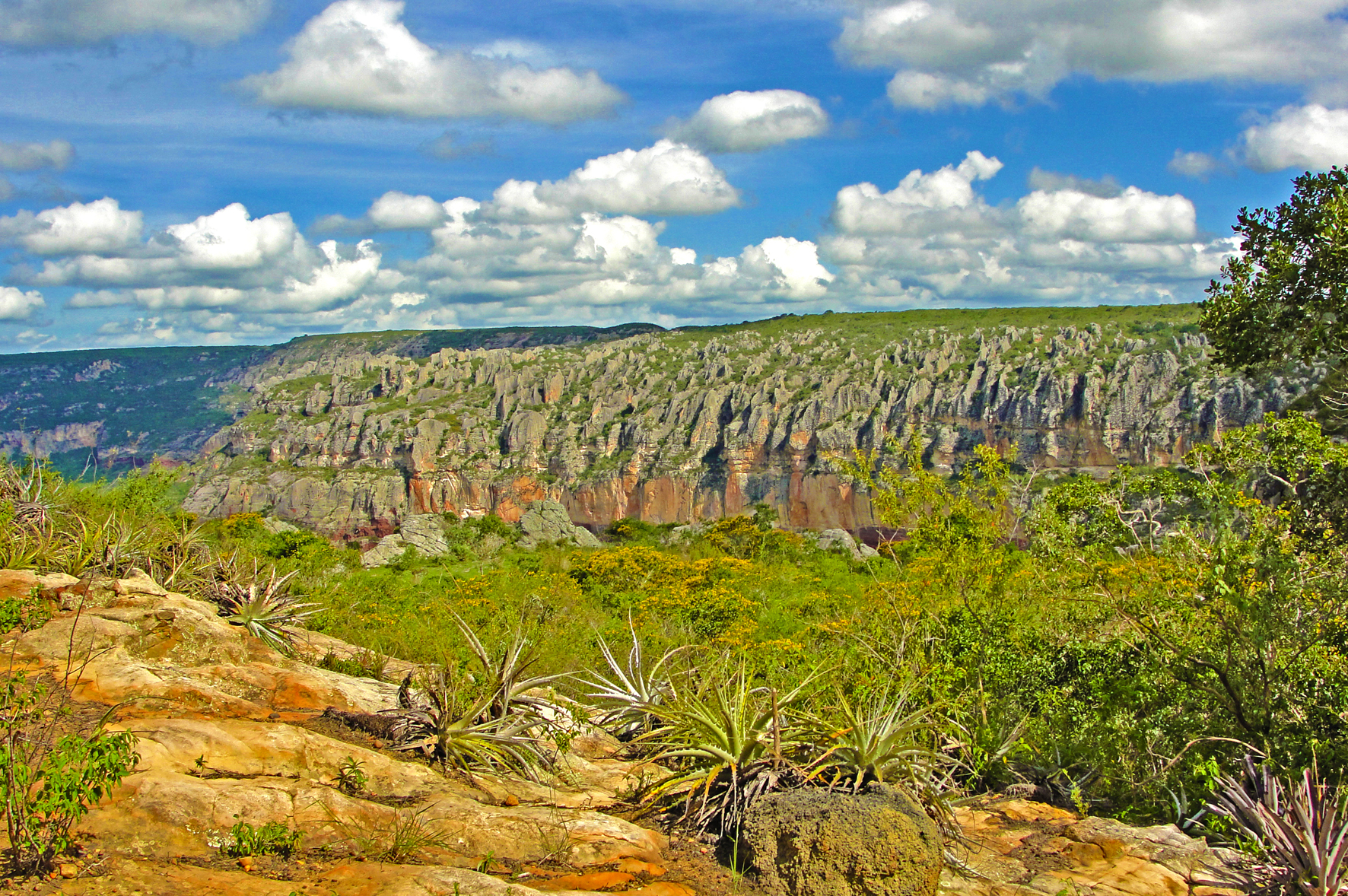

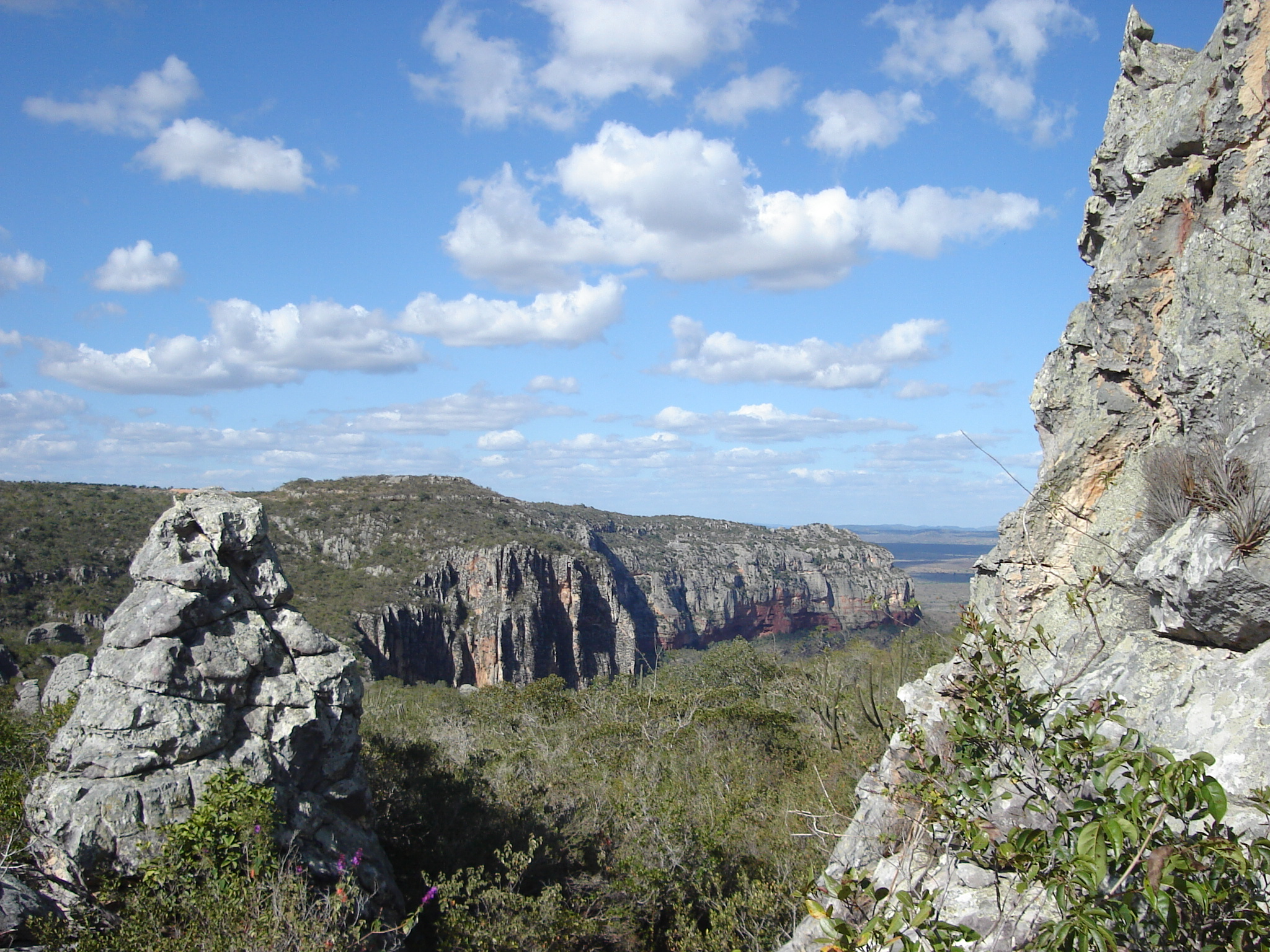

== Sources ==
- Ganem, Roseli Senna (2016), "Gestão integrada da biodiversidade: corredores, mosaicos e reservas da biosfera" (PDF), Conservação da Biodiversidade Legislação e Políticas Públicas (in Portuguese), archived from the original (PDF) on 2016-11-04
- Parna do Catimbau (in Portuguese), ICMBio: Chico Mendes Institute for Biodiversity Conservation, archived from the original on 2016-11-04
- PARNA do Catimbau (in Portuguese), ISA: Instituto Socioambiental
- Parque Nacional do Catimbau (in Portuguese), Fundação Joaquim Nabuco
- Scoones, Simon (1 July 2006), Focus on Brazil, Gareth Stevens, ISBN 978-0-8368-6720-6
- Unidade de Conservação: Parque Nacional do Catimbau (in Portuguese), MMA: Ministério do Meio Ambiente
