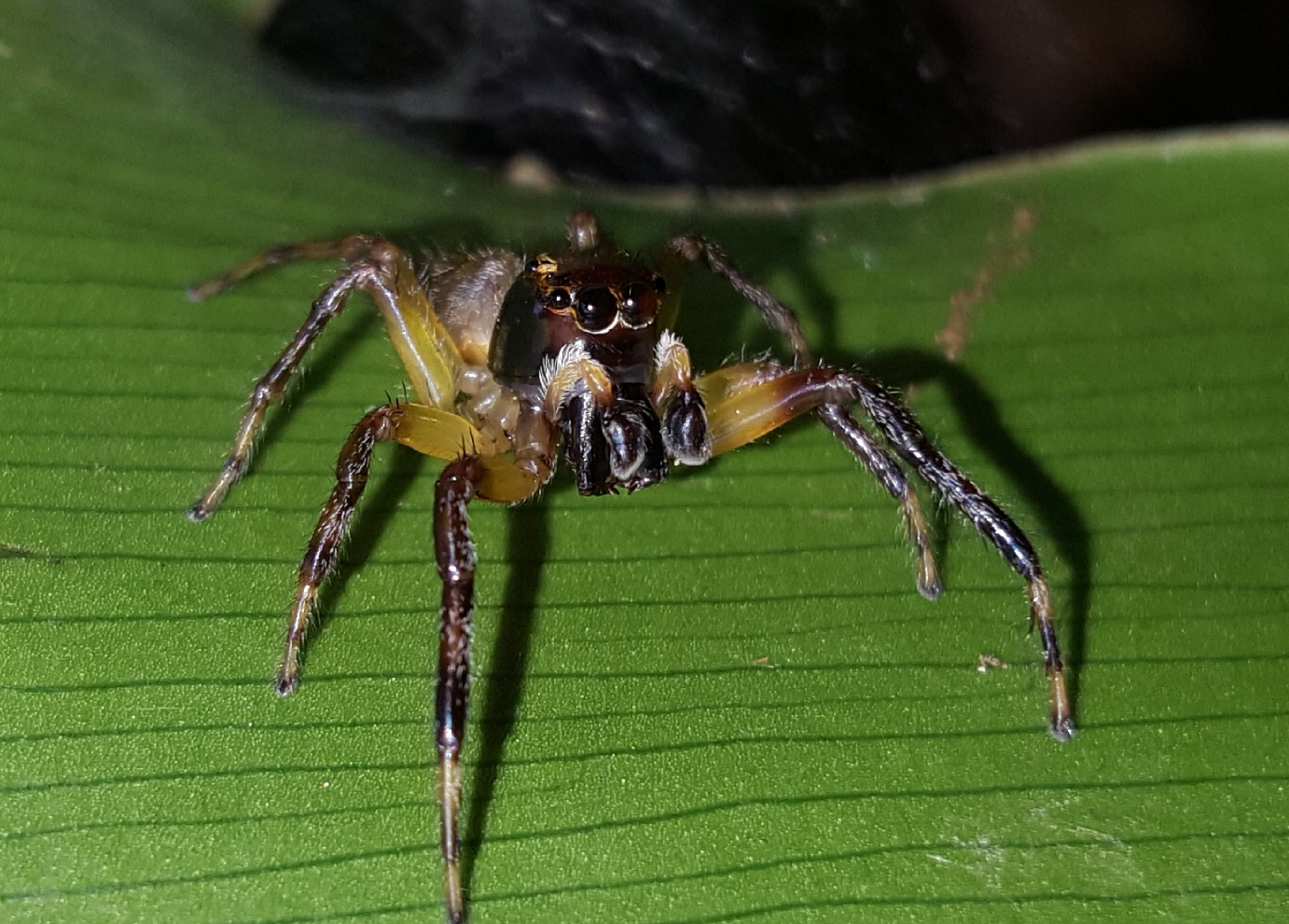
- Vinnius uncatus

Scientific classification
- Kingdom: Animalia
- Phylum: Arthropoda
- Subphylum: Chelicerata
- Class: Arachnida
- Order: Araneae
- Infraorder: Araneomorphae
- Family: Salticidae
- Subfamily: Salticinae
- Genus: Vinnius; Simon, 1902

Type species
- V. subfasciatus (C. L. Koch, 1846)

Species
- 4, see text

= Vinnius =

Genus of spiders

Vinnius is a genus of South American jumping spiders that was first described by Eugène Louis Simon in 1902. The genera Frespera and Arnoliseus were split from this genus in 2002.

== Species ==
As of August 2019 it contains four species, found in Brazil, with one species also found in Argentina:

- Vinnius buzius Braul & Lise, 2002 – Brazil
- Vinnius camacan Braul & Lise, 2002 – Brazil
- Vinnius subfasciatus (C. L. Koch, 1846) (type) – Brazil
- Vinnius uncatus Simon, 1902 – Brazil, Argentina
