= Mago chickeringi =

Scientific classification
- Kingdom: Animalia
- Phylum: Arthropoda
- Subphylum: Chelicerata
- Class: Arachnida
- Order: Araneae
- Infraorder: Araneomorphae
- Family: Salticidae
- Genus: Mago
- Species: M. chickeringi

Binomial name
- Mago chickeringi (Caporiacco, 1954)

Synonyms
- Albionella chickeringi Caporiacco, 1954

Species of spider

Mago chickeringi is a jumping spider species found in French Guiana.
