= Águas Belas =

Municipality of Pernambuco, Brazil

- Municipality
- Flag Coat of arms

- Location of Águas Belas in Pernambuco

- Location within Brazil Location within South America
- Coordinates: 9°6′39″S 37°7′22″W
- Country: Brazil
- Region: Northeast
- State: Pernambuco
- Founded: 24 May 1904

Government
  - Mayor: José Elton Martins de Souza (Republicanos) (2025-2028)
  - Vice Mayor: Eniale Bezerra Jonatas Tenório Ferro (Avante) (2025-2028)

Area
  - Total: 885.988 km^{2} (342.082 sq mi)
- Elevation: 376 m (1,234 ft)

Population (2022 Census)
  - Total: 41,548
  - Estimate (2025): 43,822
  - Density: 46.89/km^{2} (121.4/sq mi)
- Demonym: Águas-belense (Brazilian Portuguese)
- Time zone: UTC-03:00 (Brasília Time)
- Postal code: 55340-000
- HDI (2010): 0.526 – low
- Website: aguasbelas.pe.gov.br

Águas Belas (Central northeastern portuguese pronunciation: [ˈaɡ͡wɐ(s) ˈbɛlɐ(s)]) (literally Beautiful Waters) is a Brazilian municipality in the state of Pernambuco.

== History ==
The region where Águas Belas is located was originally inhabited by the Tupiniquim, who were expelled by the Carnijó tribe. The first Europeans arrived around 1700. Until 1904, Águas Belas was a district of Buíque.

The name "Águas Belas" (Portuguese for "Beautiful Waters") originated from the commentary of a judge who was visiting the city and was impressed by the excellent quality of the water in the town.

== Geography ==
- State - Pernambuco
- Region - Agreste Pernambucano
- Boundaries - Buíque and Pedra (N); Alagoas state (S); Iati (E); Itaíba (W)
- Area - 885.98 km^{2}
- Elevation - 336 m
- Hydrography - Ipanema River
- Vegetation - Caatinga Hiperxerófila
- Climate - semi arid hot
- Annual average temperature - 24.5 c
- Distance to Recife - 315 km
- Population - 43,686 (2020)

== Economy ==
The main economic activities in Águas Belas are based in industry, commerce and agribusiness especially plantations of beans, corn and manioc; and creations of cattle, goats, sheep, horses, pigs and chickens.

=== Economic indicators ===
Population	GDP x(1000 R$).	GDP pc (R$)	PE
39.672	115.899	3.051	0.19%

Economy by Sector 2006

Primary sector	Secondary sector	Service sector
17.34%	8.71%	73.95%

=== Health indicators ===
HDI (2000)	Hospitals (2007)	Hospitals beds (2007)	Children's Mortality every 1000 (2005)
0.532	1	51	25.4

== See also ==
- List of municipalities in Pernambuco
