= Sertânia =

Municipality in Pernambuco, Brazil

- Municipality
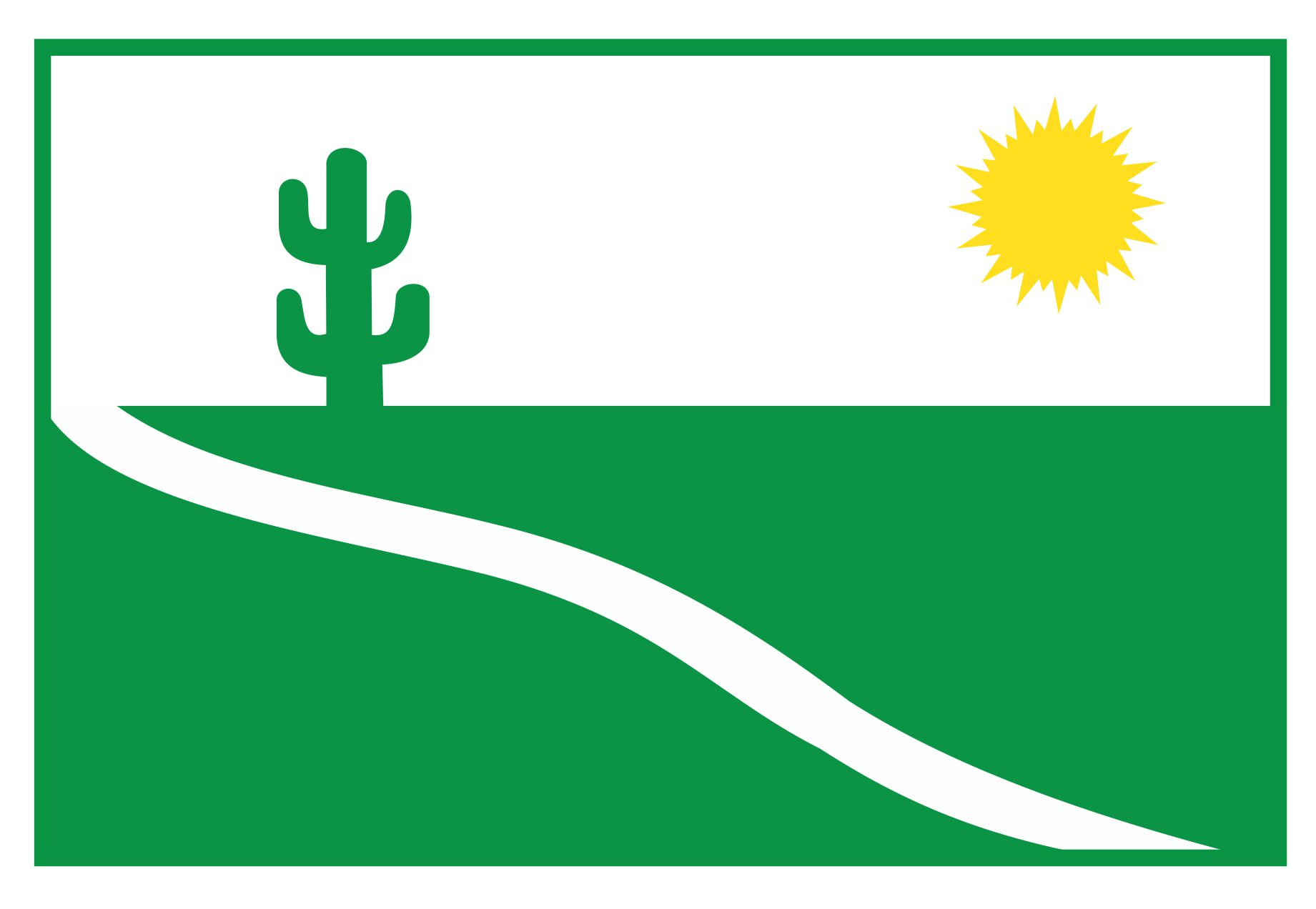
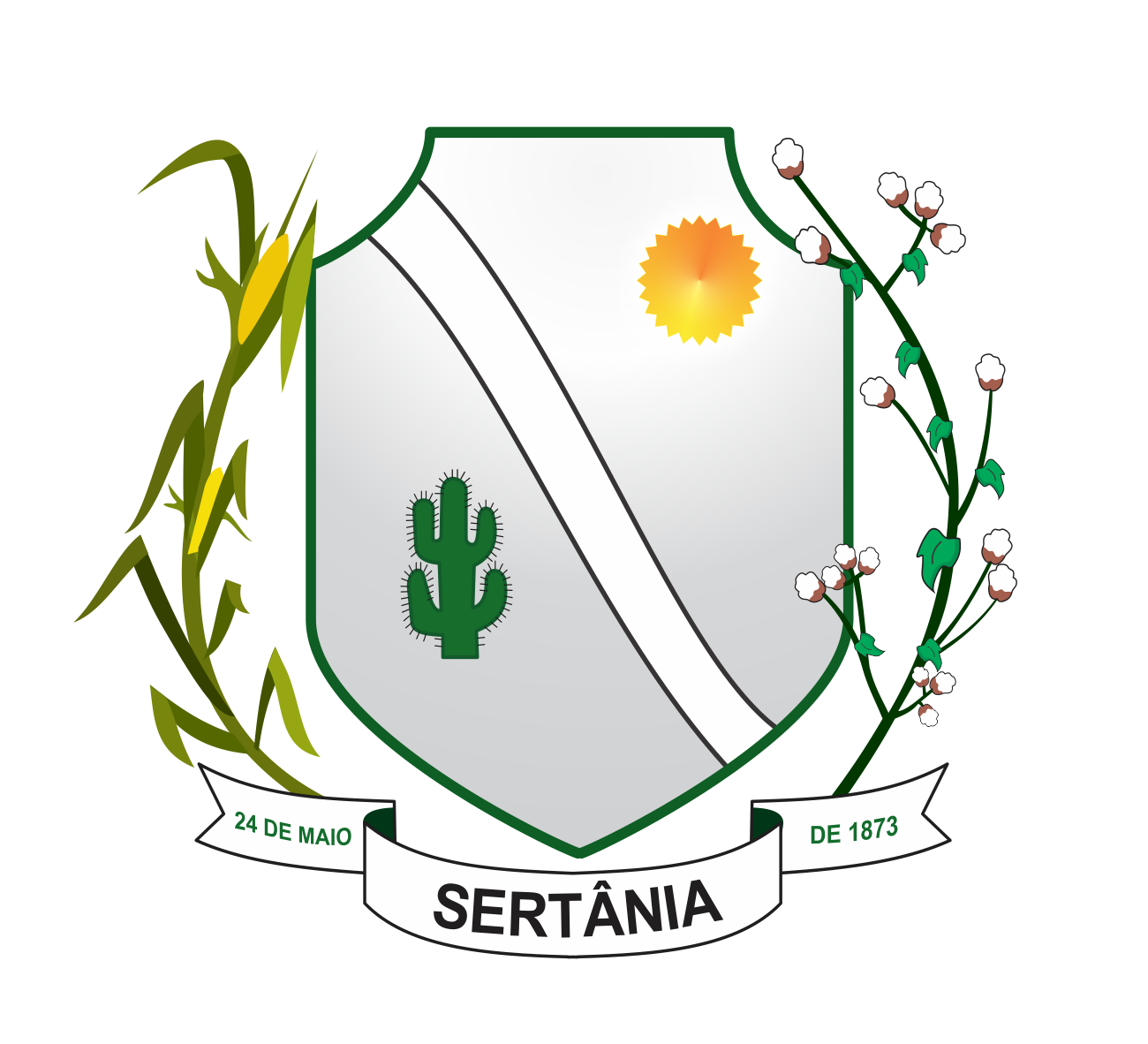
- Flag Coat of arms

- Location in Brazil
- Coordinates: 8°4′14″S 37°15′57″W
- Country: Brazil
- Region: Northeast
- State: Pernambuco
- Established: 1893

Government
  - Mayor: Gustavo Maciel Lins de Albuquerque

Area
  - Total: 2,421,511 km^{2} (934,951 sq mi)
- Elevation: 558 m (1,831 ft)

Population (2022 Census)
  - Total: 32,811
  - Estimate (2025): 34,271
  - Density: 13.95/km^{2} (36.1/sq mi)
- Time zone: UTC−3 (BRT)
- Area code: +55 81

Sertânia (Central northeastern portuguese pronunciation: [sɛɦˈtɐ̃njɐ]) is a city in the state of Pernambuco, Brazil. The population in 2025, according to the IBGE, was 34,271. Its total area is 2409.51 km^{2}.

== Geography ==
- State - Pernambuco
- Region - Sertão Pernambucano
- Boundaries - Iguaraci and Paraíba state (N); Arcoverde, Buíque, Ibimirim and Tupanatinga (S); Custódia (W); Paraíba (E)
- Area - 2421.51 km²
- Elevation - 558 m
- Hydrography - Moxotó River
- Vegetation - Caatinga Hiperxerófila
- Climate - semi-arid, hot and dry
- Annual average temperature - 23.7 c
- Distance to Recife - 309 km

== Economy ==
The main economic activities in Sertânia are based in industry, commerce and agribusiness, especially the raising of cattle, sheep (over 85,000), pigs, goats (over 120,000), horses, and donkeys; and plantations of corn, tomatoes and beans.

=== Economic indicators ===
Population	GDP x(1000 R$).	GDP pc (R$)	PE
35.914	114.212	3.352	0.19%

Economy by sector 2006

Primary sector	Secondary sector	Service sector
13.63%	10.81%	75.56%

=== Health indicators ===
HDI (2000)	Hospitals (2007)	Hospitals beds (2007)	Children's mortality every 1000 (2005)
0.648	2	109	31.6

== See also ==
- List of municipalities in Pernambuco
