= Itaíba =

Municipality of Pernambuco, Brazil

- Municipality of Pernambuco, Brazil
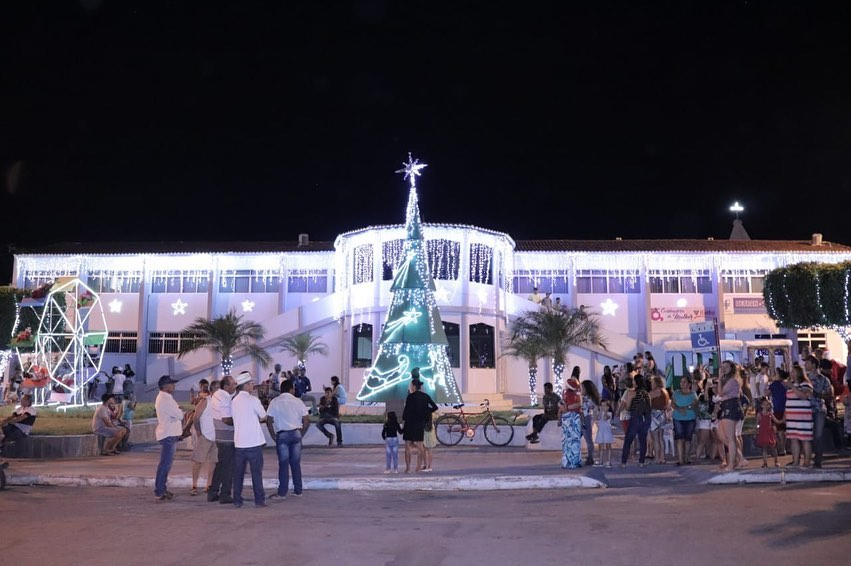
- City hall of Itaíba

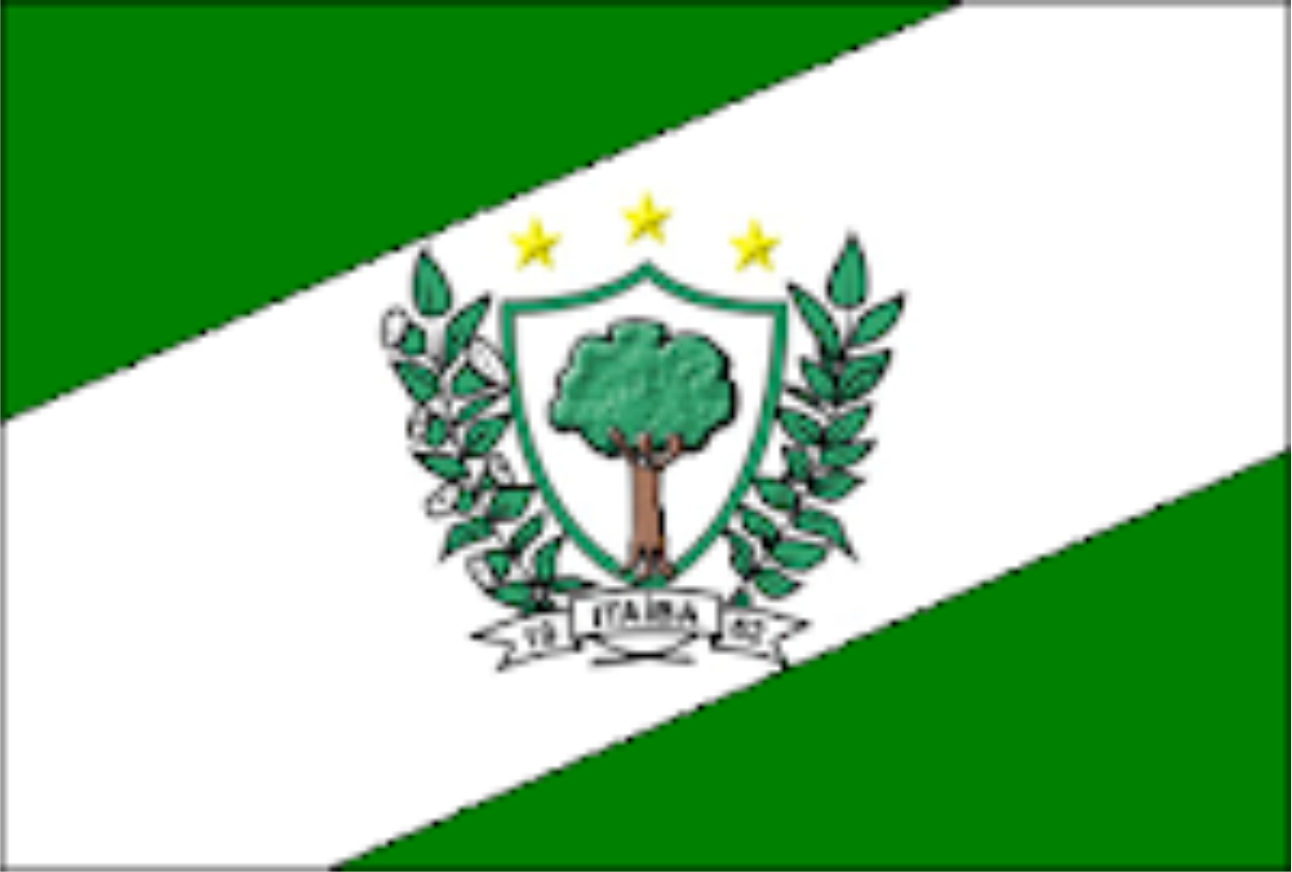
- Flag

- Location of Itaíba in Pernambuco

- Location within Brazil Location within South America
- Coordinates: 8°56′52″S 37°25′22″W
- Country: Brazil
- Region: Northeast
- State: Pernambuco
- Founded: 28 April 1962

Government
  - Mayor: Pedro Teotônio da Silva Neto (Republicanos) (2025-2028)
  - Vice Mayor: Eliandro Natanael Ramos (MDB) (2025-2028)

Area
  - Total: 1,034.044 km^{2} (399.247 sq mi)
- Elevation: 478 m (1,568 ft)

Population (2022 Census)
  - Total: 32,650
  - Estimate (2025): 33,995
  - Density: 30.75/km^{2} (79.6/sq mi)
- Demonym: Itaibense (Brazilian Portuguese)
- Time zone: UTC-03:00 (Brasília Time)
- Postal code: 56550-000, 56555-000, 56557-000
- HDI (2010): 0.510 – low
- Website: itaiba.pe.gov.br

Itaíba (Central northeastern portuguese pronunciation: [itaˈiˑbɐ]) is a city located in the state of Pernambuco, Brazil. It is located 306 km away from Recife, the capital of the state of Pernambuco. It has an estimated (IBGE 2020) population of 26,308 inhabitants.

== Geography ==
- State - Pernambuco
- Region - Agreste Pernambucano
- Boundaries - Tupanatinga (N); Alagoas state (S); Buique and Águas Belas (E); Manari and Alagoas state (W).
- Area - 1068.29 km^{2}
- Elevation - 478 m
- Hydrography - Ipanema River
- Vegetation - Caatinga Hiperxerófila
- Climate - Semi arid hot
- Annual average temperature - 24.1 c
- Distance to Recife - 331 km

== Economy ==
The main economic activities in Itaíba are based in agribusiness, especially beans, corn; and livestock such as cattle (over 83,000 heads), goats, sheep, pigs, horses and poultry.

=== Economic indicators ===
Population	GDP x(1000 R$)	GDP pc (R$)	PE
27.631	106.164	3.971	0.18%

Economy by Sector 2006

Primary sector	Secondary sector	Service sector
31.92%	6.36%	61.72%

=== Health indicators ===
HDI (2000)	Hospitals (2007)	Hospitals beds (2007)	Children's Mortality every 1000 (2005)
0.567	1	18	17.5

== See also ==
- List of municipalities in Pernambuco
