= Arcoverde =

Municipality of Pernambuco, Brazil

- Municipality
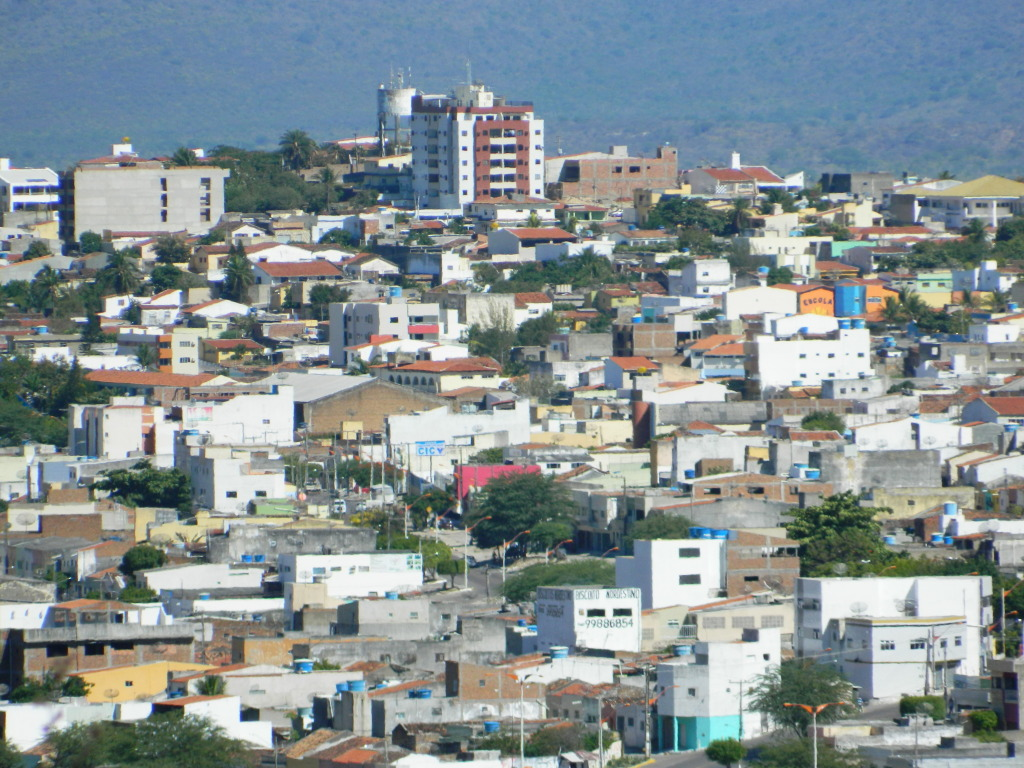
- Downtown Arcoverde

- Flag Coat of arms
- Nickname: Portal do Sertão
- Location in Pernambuco state

- Location in Brazil
- Coordinates: 8°25′08″S 37°03′14″W
- Country: Brazil
- Region: Northeast
- State: Pernambuco
- Mesoregion: Sertão Pernambucano
- Microregion: Sertão do Moxotó
- Founded: September 11, 1928

Government
  - Type: Mayor–council
  - Body: Municipal Chamber of Arcoverde
  - Mayor: Zeca Cavalcanti ( PODE)

Area
  - Total: 343.923 km^{2} (132.789 sq mi)
- Elevation: 663 m (2,175 ft)

Population (2022 Census)
  - Total: 77,742
  - Estimate (2025): 82,487
  - Density: 226.04/km^{2} (585.45/sq mi)
- Demonym: Arcoverdense
- Time zone: UTC– 03:00 (BRT)
- Area code: +55 87
- Website: www.arcoverde.pe.gov.br

Arcoverde (Central northeastern portuguese pronunciation: [ɐɦkuˈveɦdi]) is a municipality in Pernambuco, Brazil. It is located in the mesoregion of Sertão Pernambucano. Arcoverde has a total area of 344 km² and lies west of the capital Recife by 256 km. Arcoverde has boundaries with Paraíba to the north, Buíque and Pedra to the south, Pesqueira to the east, and Sertânia to the west.

In the census of 2022, Arcoverde had a population of 77,742 people, making it the 22nd most populous municipality in Pernambuco and the third most populous in the Sertão Pernambucano region, trailing only Serra Talhada and Araripina.

== Economy ==
The main economic activities in Arcoverde are based in general commerce, services and primary sector.

== Geography ==
=== Climate ===
Climate data for Arcoverde (1991-2020)
Month	Jan	Feb	Mar	Apr	May	Jun	Jul	Aug	Sep	Oct	Nov	Dec	Year
Mean daily maximum °C (°F)	—	31.6 (88.9)	31.3 (88.3)	30.2 (86.4)	28.2 (82.8)	26.5 (79.7)	25.7 (78.3)	26.9 (80.4)	29.4 (84.9)	31.5 (88.7)	32.5 (90.5)	32.6 (90.7)	—
Daily mean °C (°F)	—	24.9 (76.8)	24.8 (76.6)	24.2 (75.6)	22.9 (73.2)	21.3 (70.3)	20.5 (68.9)	20.8 (69.4)	22.3 (72.1)	23.9 (75.0)	25.0 (77.0)	25.3 (77.5)	—
Mean daily minimum °C (°F)	—	19.8 (67.6)	19.9 (67.8)	19.5 (67.1)	18.9 (66.0)	17.7 (63.9)	16.9 (62.4)	16.5 (61.7)	17.2 (63.0)	18.4 (65.1)	19.1 (66.4)	19.6 (67.3)	—
Average precipitation mm (inches)	—	63.0 (2.48)	106.7 (4.20)	61.6 (2.43)	89.0 (3.50)	83.3 (3.28)	77.6 (3.06)	55.0 (2.17)	19.7 (0.78)	16.9 (0.67)	15.3 (0.60)	26.1 (1.03)	—
Average precipitation days (≥ 1 mm)	—	5	—	7	9	11	13	9	3	2	2	3	—
Average relative humidity (%)	—	73.4	75.6	76.7	82.5	83.8	85.0	80.9	75.1	71.2	67.9	68.7	—
Average dew point °C (°F)	—	20.6 (69.1)	21.0 (69.8)	20.6 (69.1)	20.3 (68.5)	19.0 (66.2)	18.3 (64.9)	18.2 (64.8)	18.6 (65.5)	19.2 (66.6)	19.8 (67.6)	20.0 (68.0)	—
Mean monthly sunshine hours	—	219.7	238.3	233.7	206.7	179.5	185.6	237.0	265.7	293.6	275.9	266.3	—
Source: NOAA

== See also ==
- List of municipalities in Pernambuco
