= Nebridia =

Scientific classification
- Kingdom: Animalia
- Phylum: Arthropoda
- Subphylum: Chelicerata
- Class: Arachnida
- Order: Araneae
- Infraorder: Araneomorphae
- Family: Salticidae
- Subfamily: Salticinae
- Genus: Nebridia; Simon, 1902
- Species: N. semicana

Binomial name
- Nebridia semicana Simon, 1902

Genus of spiders

Nebridia is a monotypic genus of Venezuelan jumping spiders containing the single species, Nebridia semicana. It was first described by Eugène Louis Simon in 1902, and is only found in Venezuela. It was briefly considered a synonym of Amphidraus, it was elevated to genus status in 2017.

Amphidraus, circumscribed to include Nebridia, is placed in the tribe Euophryini, part of the Salticoida clade of the subfamily Salticinae.
