= Anaurus =

Scientific classification
- Kingdom: Animalia
- Phylum: Arthropoda
- Subphylum: Chelicerata
- Class: Arachnida
- Order: Araneae
- Infraorder: Araneomorphae
- Family: Salticidae
- Genus: Anaurus; Simon, 1900
- Species: A. flavimanus

Binomial name
- Anaurus flavimanus Simon, 1900

Genus of spiders

Anaurus is a monotypic genus of Brazilian jumping spiders containing the single species, Anaurus flavimanus. It was first described by Eugène Louis Simon in 1900, and is only found in Brazil.
