= Yacuitella =

Scientific classification
- Kingdom: Animalia
- Phylum: Arthropoda
- Subphylum: Chelicerata
- Class: Arachnida
- Order: Araneae
- Infraorder: Araneomorphae
- Family: Salticidae
- Genus: Yacuitella; Galiano, 1999
- Species: Y. nana

Binomial name
- Yacuitella nana Galiano, 1999

Genus of spiders

Yacuitella is a monotypic genus of Argentinian jumping spiders containing the single species, Yacuitella nana. It was first described by María Elena Galiano in 1999, and is found in Argentina.
