= Macutula =

Scientific classification
- Kingdom: Animalia
- Phylum: Arthropoda
- Subphylum: Chelicerata
- Class: Arachnida
- Order: Araneae
- Infraorder: Araneomorphae
- Family: Salticidae
- Subfamily: Salticinae
- Genus: Macutula; Ruiz, 2011

Type species
- Macutula aracoiaba Ruiz, 2011

Species
- See text.

Genus of spiders

Macutula is a spider genus of the jumping spider family, Salticidae, from Brazil. It comprises medium-sized jumping spiders (4–7 mm) with slightly flattened bodies and dark brown carapaces. It is distinguished from other genera in the Amycoida clade by the deep prolateral excavation on the dorsal surface of the cymbium of the male pedipalp, forming a dorsal keel.

== Species ==
- Macutula aracoiaba Ruiz, 2011 (Brazil)
- Macutula caruaru Ruiz, 2011 (Brazil)
- Macutula santana Ruiz, 2011 (Brazil)
