= Maenola =

Scientific classification
- Kingdom: Animalia
- Phylum: Arthropoda
- Subphylum: Chelicerata
- Class: Arachnida
- Order: Araneae
- Infraorder: Araneomorphae
- Family: Salticidae
- Subfamily: Salticinae
- Genus: Maenola; Simon, 1900

Type species
- Maenola starkei Simon, 1900

Species
- See text.

Genus of spiders

Maenola is a spider genus of the jumping spider family, Salticidae from South America.

== Species ==
- Maenola braziliana Soares & Camargo, 1948 (Brazil)
- Maenola lunata Mello-Leitão, 1940 (Guyana)
- Maenola starkei Simon, 1900 (Venezuela)
