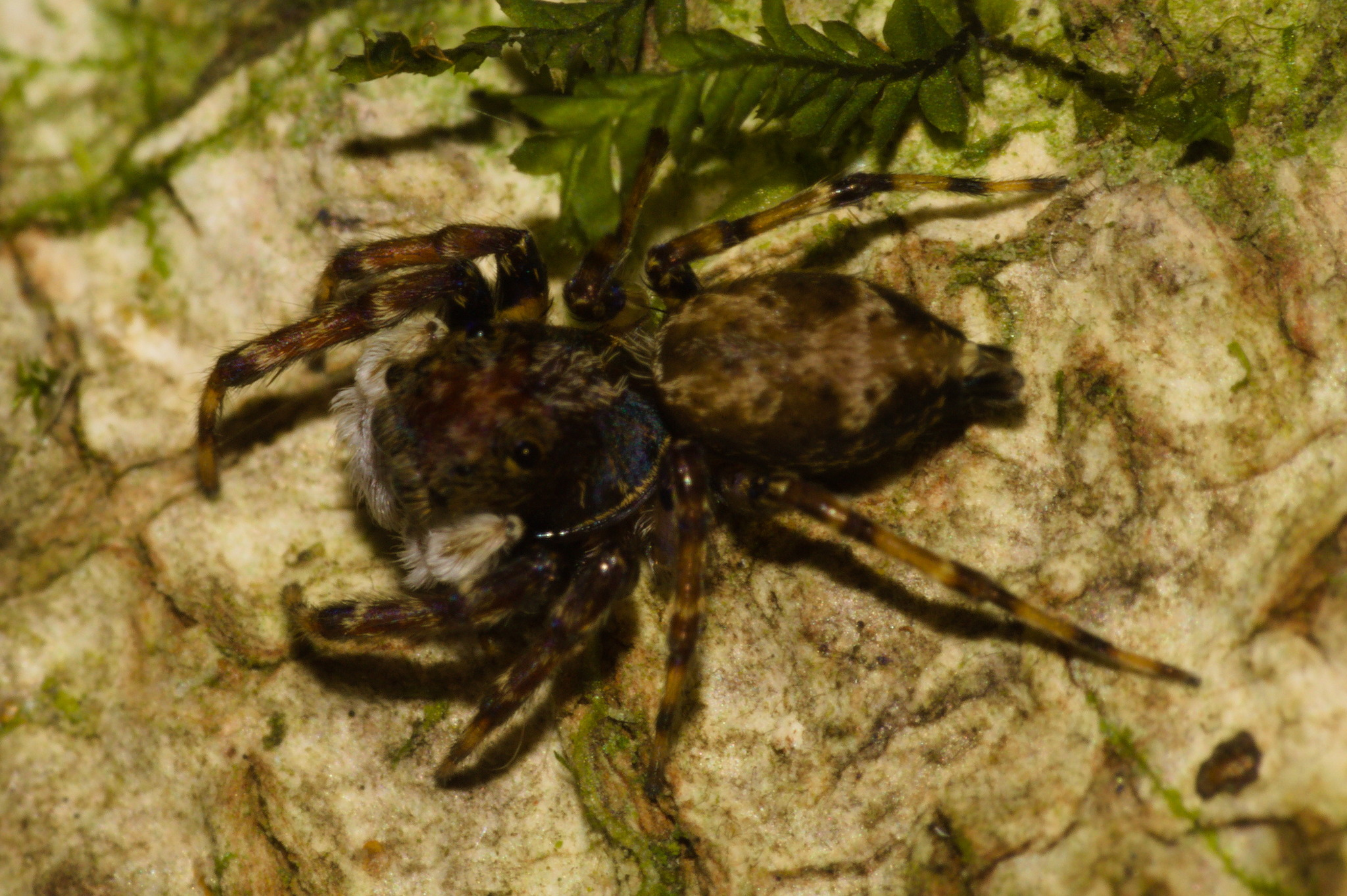
- Encolpius guaraniticus

Scientific classification
- Kingdom: Animalia
- Phylum: Arthropoda
- Subphylum: Chelicerata
- Class: Arachnida
- Order: Araneae
- Infraorder: Araneomorphae
- Family: Salticidae
- Subfamily: Salticinae
- Genus: Encolpius; Simon, 1900

Type species
- E. albobarbatus Simon, 1900

Species
- E. albobarbatus Simon, 1900 – Brazil; E. fimbriatus Crane, 1943 – Venezuela; E. guaraniticus Galiano, 1968 – Argentina

= Encolpius =

Genus of spiders

Encolpius is a genus of South American jumping spiders that was first described by Eugène Louis Simon in 1900. As of June 2019 it contains only three species, found only in Argentina, Venezuela, and Brazil: E. albobarbatus, E. fimbriatus, and E. guaraniticus.
