= Letoia =

Scientific classification
- Kingdom: Animalia
- Phylum: Arthropoda
- Subphylum: Chelicerata
- Class: Arachnida
- Order: Araneae
- Infraorder: Araneomorphae
- Family: Salticidae
- Genus: Letoia
- Species: L. ephippiata

Binomial name
- Letoia ephippiata Simon, 1900

Genus of spiders

Letoia is a genus of jumping spiders endemic to Venezuela. It contains only one species, Letoia ephippiata.

== Name ==
The species name is derived from Ancient Greek ephippi- "saddle".
