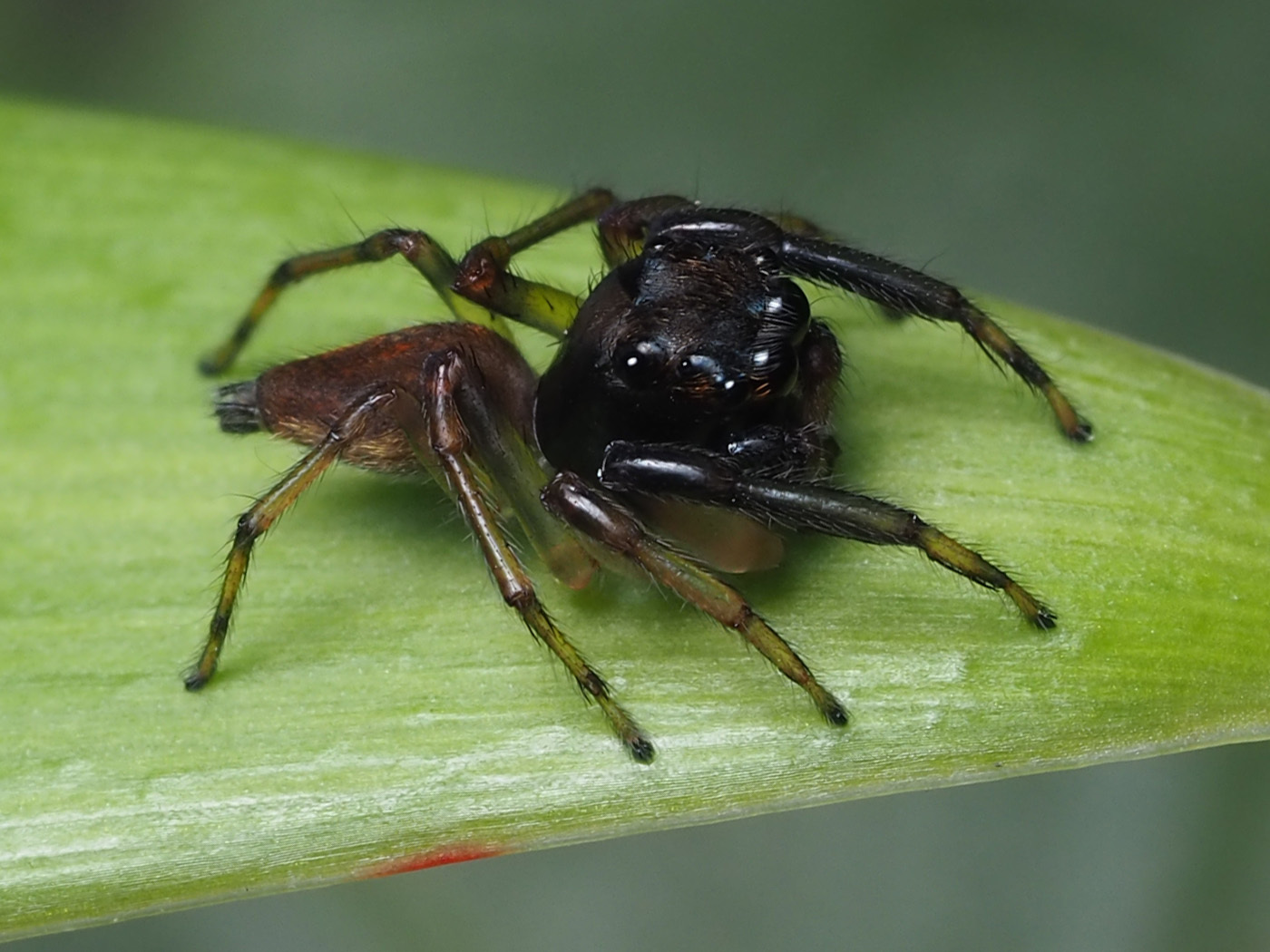
- A. albipalpus
- male A. igneus

Scientific classification
- Kingdom: Animalia
- Phylum: Arthropoda
- Subphylum: Chelicerata
- Class: Arachnida
- Order: Araneae
- Infraorder: Araneomorphae
- Family: Salticidae
- Subfamily: Salticinae
- Genus: Amycus; C. L. Koch, 1846

Type species
- A. igneus (Perty, 1833)

Species
- 12, see text

= Amycus (spider) =

Genus of spiders

Amycus is a genus of jumping spiders that was first described by Carl Ludwig Koch in 1846.

== Species ==
As of June 2019 it contains eleven species, found only in South America and Mexico:

- Amycus albipalpus Galvis, 2015 – Colombia
- Amycus annulatus Simon, 1900 – Brazil
- Amycus ectypus Simon, 1900 – Peru, Brazil
- Amycus equulus Simon, 1900 – Brazil
- Amycus flavicomis Simon, 1900 – Brazil, Argentina
- Amycus flavolineatus C. L. Koch, 1846 – Mexico
- Amycus igneus (Perty, 1833) (type) – Brazil
- Amycus lycosiformis Taczanowski, 1878 – Peru
- Amycus pertyi Simon, 1900 – Peru, French Guiana
- Amycus rufifrons Simon, 1900 – Brazil
- Amycus spectabilis C. L. Koch, 1846 – Colombia, Peru, Brazil
