= Buíque =

Municipality of Pernambuco State, Brazil

- Municipality of Pernambuco, Brazil
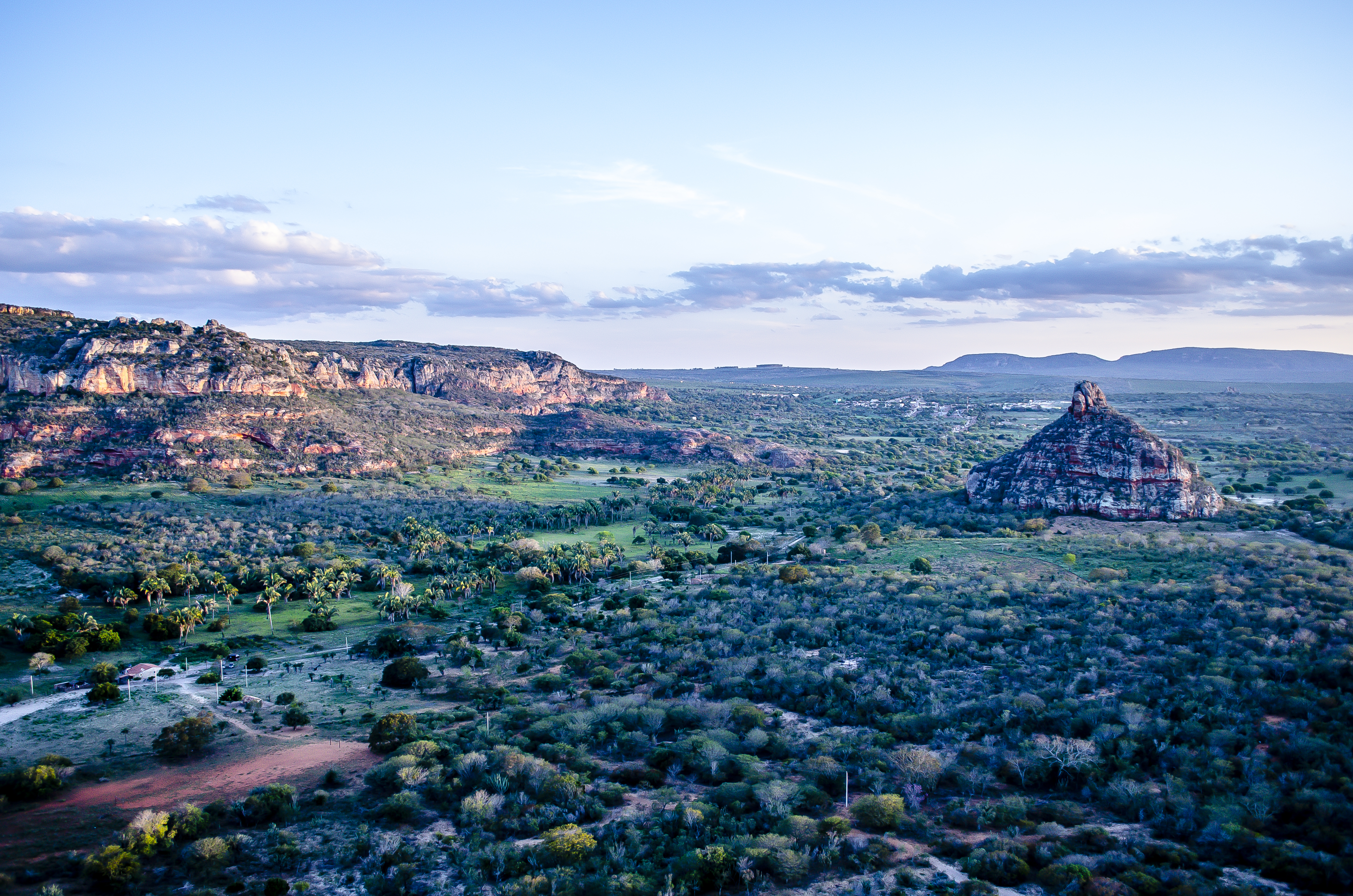
- Catimbau Valley in Buíque

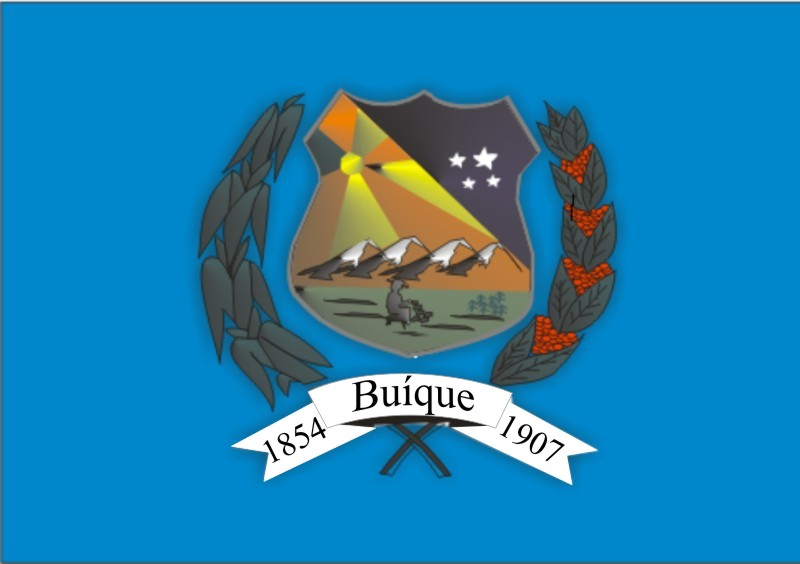
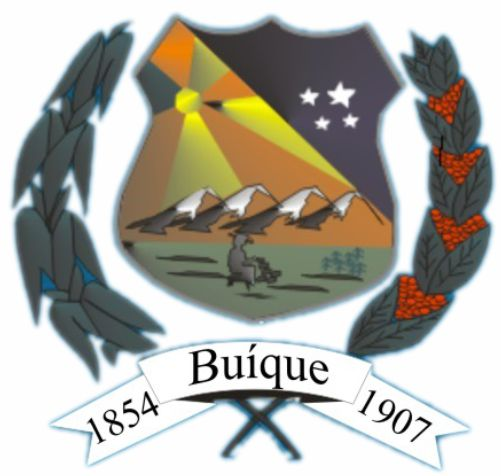
- Flag Coat of arms

- Location of Buíque in Pernambuco

- Location within Brazil Location within South America
- Coordinates: 8°37′24″S 37°9′23″W
- Country: Brazil
- Region: Northeast
- State: Pernambuco
- Founded: 26 May 1904

Government
  - Mayor: Túlio Henrique Araújo Cavalcanti (MDB) (2025-2028)
  - Vice Mayor: Miriam Briano Alves (PSDB) (2025-2028)

Area
  - Total: 1,336.544 km^{2} (516.043 sq mi)
- Elevation: 814 m (2,671 ft)

Population (2022 Census)
  - Total: 52,097
  - Estimate (2025): 53,489
  - Density: 38.98/km^{2} (101.0/sq mi)
- Demonym: Buiquense (Brazilian Portuguese)
- Time zone: UTC-03:00 (Brasília Time)
- Postal code: 56520-000, 56533-000, 56535-000, 56537-000
- HDI (2010): 0.527 – low
- Website: buique.pe.gov.br

Buíque (Portuguese: [buˈiki]) is a Brazilian municipality in the state of Pernambuco, mesoregion of Agreste. It has an estimated population of 58,919 in a total area of 1345,1 km^{2}. The Kapinawá Indigenous Reserve is located in the municipality of Buíque.

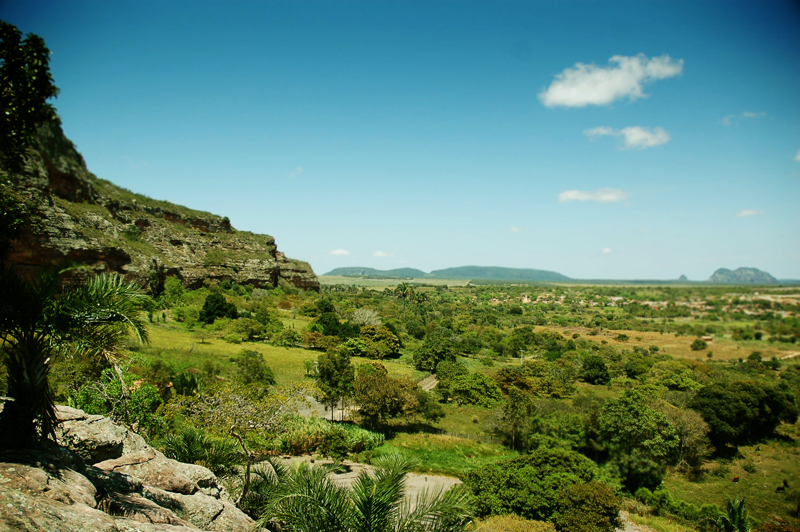
Catimbau Valley, Brazil's second largest archeological site

== History ==
The municipality of Buíque was settled in 1752, and was originally known as Campos de Buíque. Buíque became a village in 1854 and a city in 1874.

The writer Graciliano Ramos grew up in Buíque. At age 18, Graciliano wrote to this mother: "This is as the devil likes it: one wakes up at five in the morning and spends the day reading, smoking, eating and praying; one sleeps at nine in the evening. The life of an angel."

== Geography ==
It is located at latitude 08º37'23" south and longitude 37º09'21" west, 798 meters above sea level, and 278 km from Pernambuco's state capital, Recife.

The Catimbau Valley or Vale do Catimbau in Portuguese, Brazil's second largest archeological site, is located in Buíque. Among its attractions are beautiful canyons, over 2,000 caves, and 28 registered areas with prehistoric cave paintings. The Brazilian federal government has listed the valley as a Unit of Integral Conservation and Preservation.

- State – Pernambuco
- Region – Agreste of Pernambuco
- Boundaries – Arcoverde and Sertânia (N); Águas Belas (S); Pedra (E); Tupanatinga and Itaíba (W)
- Area – 1345.1 km^{2}
- Elevation – 798 m
- Hydrography – Ipanema and Moxotó rivers
- Vegetation – Subcaducifólia forest
- Clima – semi-arid – hot and dry
- Annual average temperature – 21.5 c
- Distance to Recife – 278 km

== Economy ==
The main economic activities in Buique are based in general commerce, some eco-tourism and agribusiness, especially plantations of cashew nuts, manioc, and beans, and the farming of cattle, sheep and goats.

=== Economic indicators ===
Population	GDP x(1000 R$).	GDP pc (R$)	PE
53.272	172.447	3.453	0.29%

Economy by sector 2006

Primary sector	Secondary sector	Service sector
28.77%	6.47%	64.76%

=== Health indicators ===
HDI (2000)	Hospitals (2007)	Hospitals beds (2007)	Children's Mortality every 1000 (2005)
0.575	2	64	27.7

== See also ==
- List of municipalities in Pernambuco
