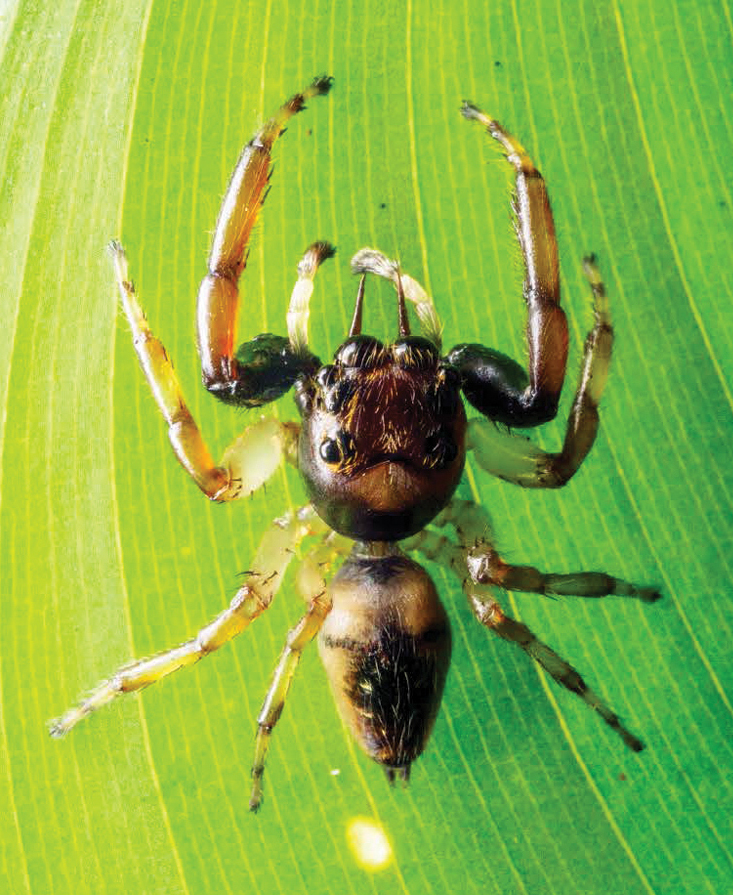
- Arnoliseus hastatus

Scientific classification
- Kingdom: Animalia
- Phylum: Arthropoda
- Subphylum: Chelicerata
- Class: Arachnida
- Order: Araneae
- Infraorder: Araneomorphae
- Family: Salticidae
- Subfamily: Salticinae
- Genus: Arnoliseus; Braul, 2002

Type species
- A. calcarifer (Simon, 1902)

Species
- See text

= Arnoliseus =

Genus of spiders

Arnoliseus is a genus of Brazilian jumping spiders (family Salticidae) that was first described by A. Braul in 2002. As of July 2021, it contained five species, found only in Brazil.

== Species ==
As of July 2021, the World Spider Catalog accepted five species:

- Arnoliseus calcarifer (Simon, 1902) (type species) – Brazil
- Arnoliseus carioca Baptista, Castanheira, Oliveira & do Prado, 2020 – Brazil
- Arnoliseus falcatus Baptista, Castanheira, Oliveira & do Prado, 2020 – Brazil
- Arnoliseus graciosa Braul & Lise, 2002 – Brazil
- Arnoliseus hastatus Baptista, Castanheira, Oliveira & do Prado, 2020 – Brazil
