= Tupanatinga =

Municipality of Pernambuco, Brazil

- Municipality of Pernambuco, Brazil
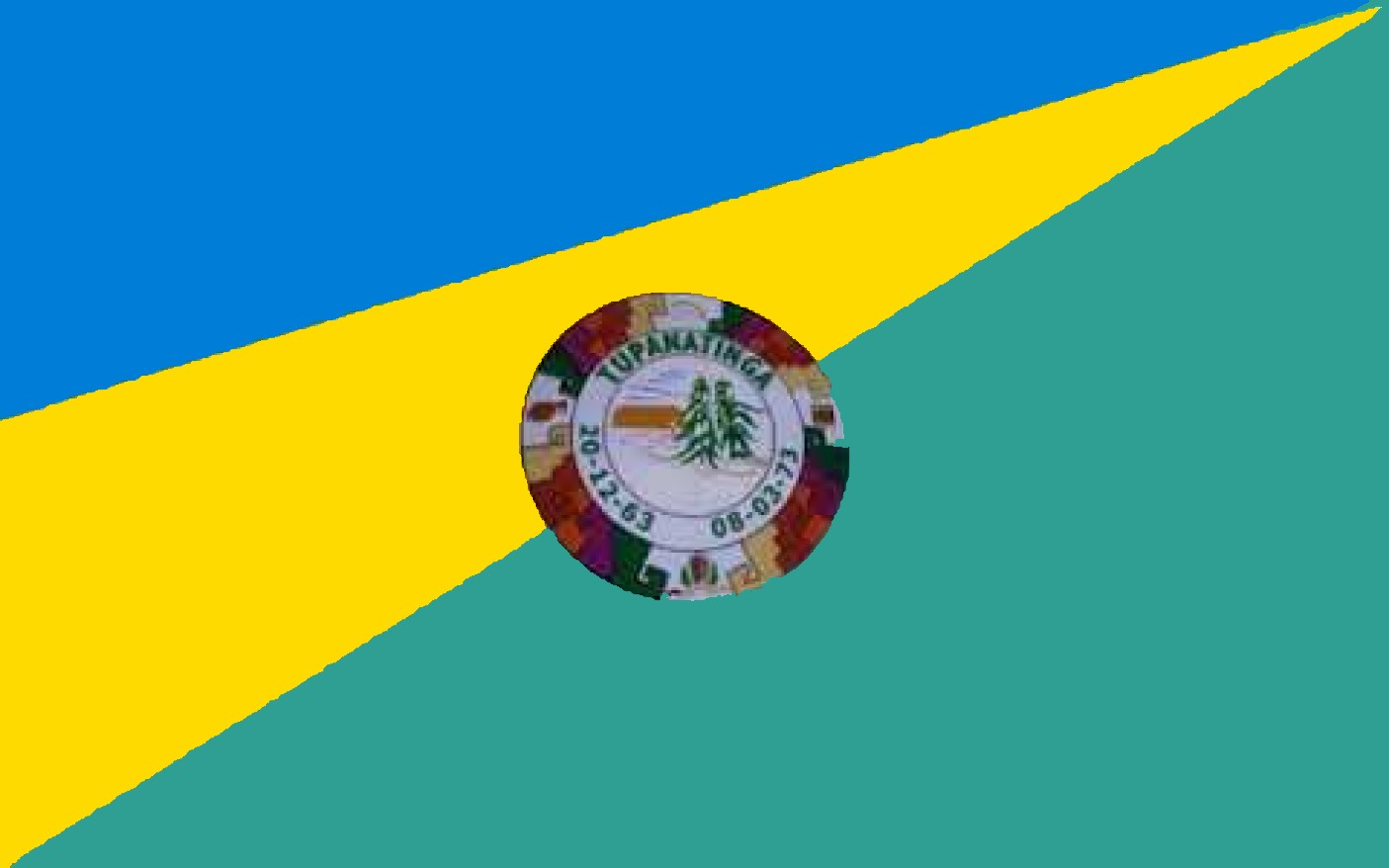
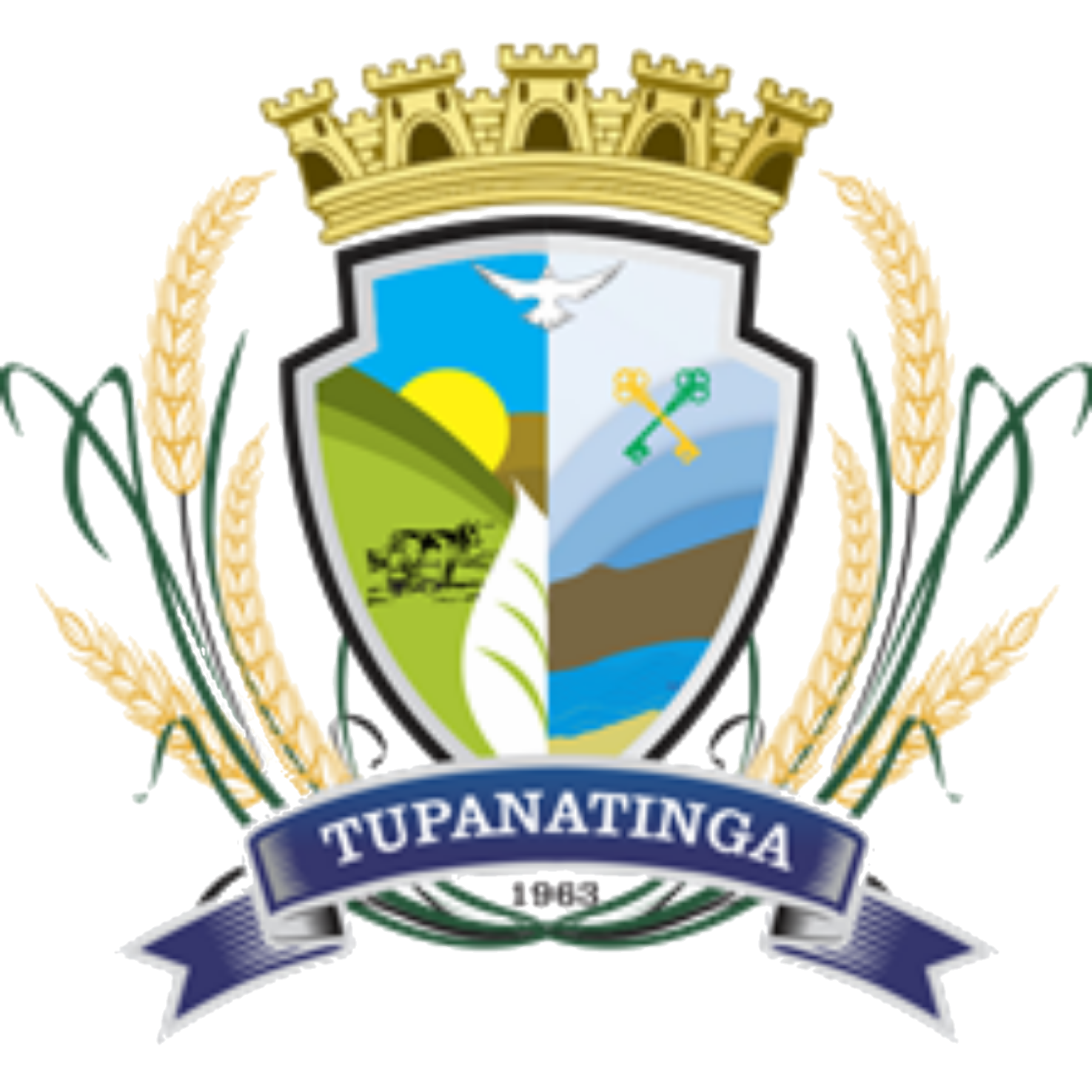
- Flag Coat of arms
- Etymology: Derived from the indigenous language, meaning "white goddess"
- Location of Tupanatinga in Pernambuco

- Location within Brazil Location within South America
- Coordinates: 8°45′10″S 37°20′24″W
- Country: Brazil
- Region: Northeast
- State: Pernambuco
- Founded: 20 December 1963

Government
  - Mayor: José Ronaldo da Silva (PP) (2025-2028)
  - Vice Mayor: Reginaldo Rodrigues (Republicanos) (2025-2028)

Area
  - Total: 847.745 km^{2} (327.316 sq mi)
- Elevation: 714 m (2,343 ft)

Population (2022 Census)
  - Total: 26,937
  - Estimate (2025): 28,141
  - Density: 28.82/km^{2} (74.6/sq mi)
- Demonym: Tupanatinguense (Brazilian Portuguese)
- Time zone: UTC-03:00 (Brasília Time)
- Postal code: 56540-000
- HDI (2010): 0.519 – low
- Website: tupanatinga.pe.gov.br

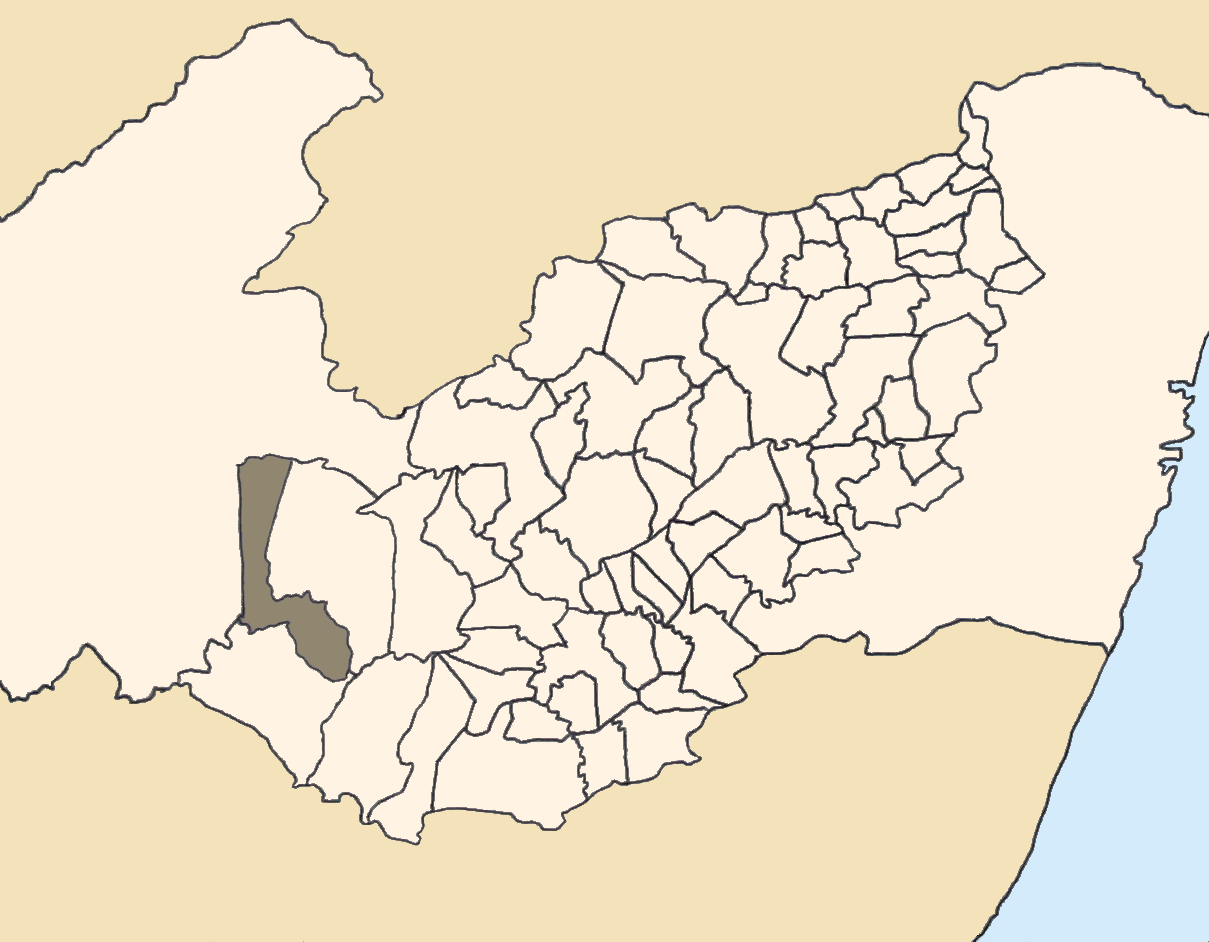
Location of Tupanatinga within Pernambuco.

Tupanatinga (Central northeastern portuguese pronunciation: [tupɐnɐˈtĩɡɐ]) is a city located in the state of Pernambuco, Brazil. Located at 306 km away from Recife, capital of the state of Pernambuco. Has an estimated (IBGE 2020) population of 27,551 inhabitants.

== Geography ==
- State - Pernambuco
- Region - Agreste Pernambucano
- Boundaries - Sertânia (N); Itaíba (S); Buique (E); Ibimirim (W).
- Area - 795.64 km^{2}
- Elevation - 710 m
- Hydrography - Moxotó and Ipanema rivers
- Vegetation - Caatinga Hiperxerófila
- Climate - Semi arid hot
- Annual average temperature - 22.3 c
- Distance to Recife - 306 km

== Economy ==
The main economic activities in Tupanatinga are based in agribusiness, especially beans, cashew nuts, corn; and livestock such as cattle, goats, sheep, pigs, horses and poultry.

=== Economic indicators ===
Population	GDP x(1000 R$).	GDP pc (R$)	PE
19.026	63.258	3.345	0.11%

Economy by Sector 2006

Primary sector	Secondary sector	Service sector
14.73%	8.37%	76.90%

=== Health indicators ===
HDI (2000)	Hospitals (2007)	Hospitals beds (2007)	Children's Mortality every 1000 (2005)
0.540	1	21	34.1

== See also ==
- List of municipalities in Pernambuco
