= Frespera =

Scientific classification
- Kingdom: Animalia
- Phylum: Arthropoda
- Subphylum: Chelicerata
- Class: Arachnida
- Order: Araneae
- Infraorder: Araneomorphae
- Family: Salticidae
- Subfamily: Salticinae
- Genus: Frespera; Braul & Lise, 2002

Type species
- F. carinata (Simon, 1902)

Species
- F. carinata (Simon, 1902) – Venezuela; F. meridionalis Braul & Lise, 2002 – Venezuela

Genus of spiders

Frespera is a genus of Venezuelan jumping spiders that was first described by A. Braul & A. A. Lise in 2002. As of June 2019 it contains only two species, found only in Venezuela: F. carinata and F. meridionalis.
