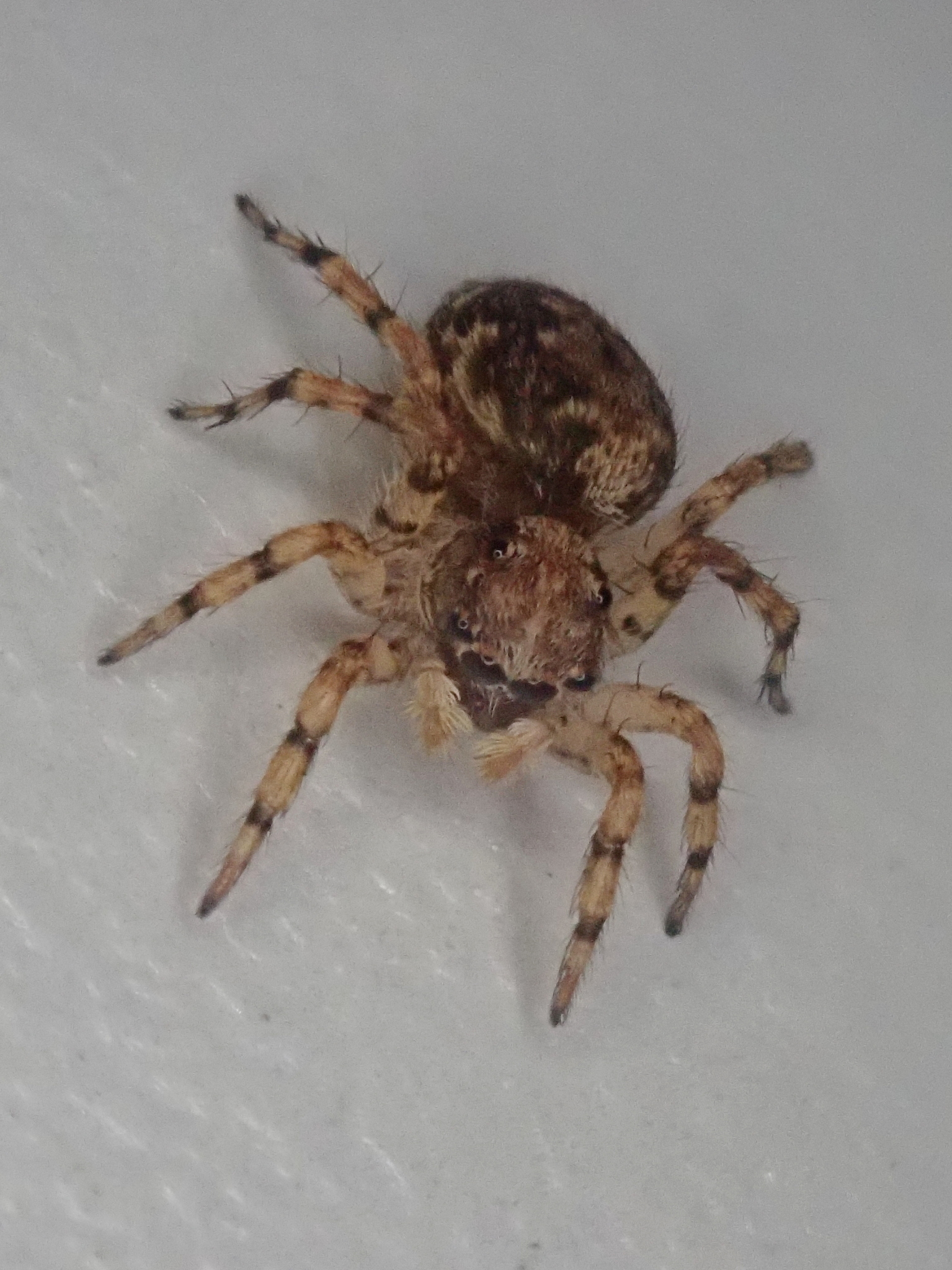
- Marma nigritarsis

Scientific classification
- Kingdom: Animalia
- Phylum: Arthropoda
- Subphylum: Chelicerata
- Class: Arachnida
- Order: Araneae
- Infraorder: Araneomorphae
- Family: Salticidae
- Subfamily: Salticinae
- Genus: Marma; Simon, 1902

Type species
- M. baeri Simon, 1902

Species
- 12, see text

Synonyms
- Paralophostica Soares & Camargo, 1948; Thysema Mello-Leitão, 1944

= Marma (spider) =

Genus of spiders

Marma is a genus of South American jumping spiders that was first described by Eugène Louis Simon in 1902.

== Species ==
As of February 2022, it contains twelve species found in South America:

- Marma abaira Salgado & Ruiz, 2020 - Brazil
- Marma argentina (Mello-Leitão, 1941) - Argentina
- Marma baeri Simon, 1902 - Ecuador
- Marma femella (Caporiacco, 1955) - Venezuela
- Marma linae Salgado & Ruiz, 2020 - Brazil
- Marma nigritarsis (Simon, 1900) - Colombia, Venezuela, Guyana, French Guiana, Brazil, Paraguay, Argentina
- Marma pechichon Cala-Riquelme & Salgado, 2021 - Colombia
- Marma pipa Salgado & Ruiz, 2020 - Brazil
- Marma rosea (Mello-Leitão, 1941) - Brazil, Argentina
- Marma sinuosa Salgado & Ruiz, 2020 - Brazil
- Marma spelunca Salgado & Ruiz, 2020 - Brazil
- Marma wesolowskae Salgado & Ruiz, 2020 - Brazil
