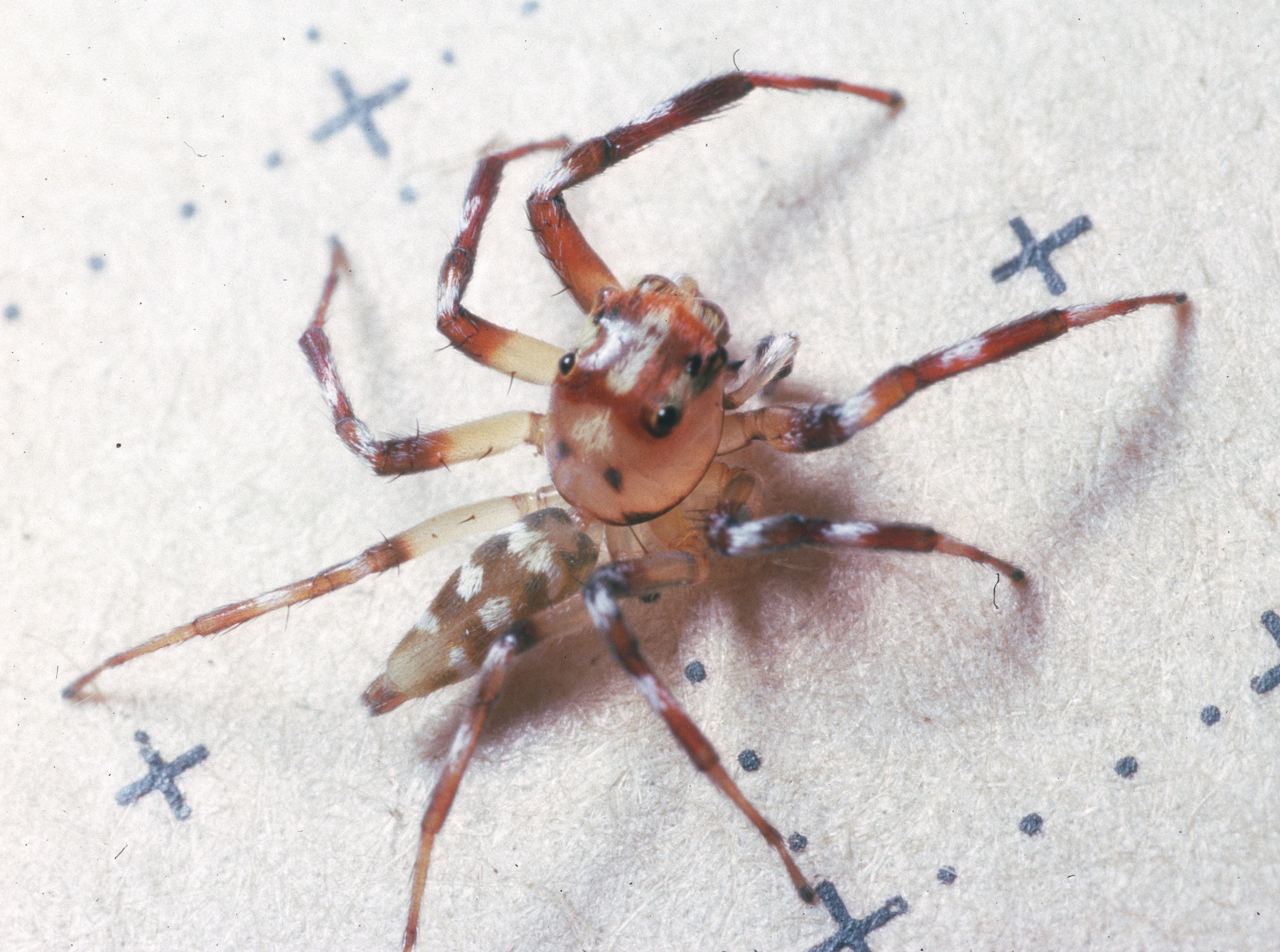
- Male Noegus sp. in Ecuador

Scientific classification
- Kingdom: Animalia
- Phylum: Arthropoda
- Subphylum: Chelicerata
- Class: Arachnida
- Order: Araneae
- Infraorder: Araneomorphae
- Family: Salticidae
- Subfamily: Salticinae
- Genus: Noegus; Simon, 1900

Type species
- N. vulpio Simon, 1900

Species
- 24, see text

Synonyms
- Beccaria Caporiacco, 1947; Pseudamphidraus Caporiacco, 1947

= Noegus =

Genus of spiders

Noegus is a genus of jumping spiders that was first described by Eugène Louis Simon in 1900.

== Species ==
As of July 2019 it contains twenty-four species, found in Central America, Guyana, Argentina, Brazil, Peru, and French Guiana:

- Noegus actinosus Simon, 1900 – Brazil, Peru
- Noegus arator Simon, 1900 – Brazil
- Noegus australis (Mello-Leitão, 1941) – Brazil
- Noegus bidens Simon, 1900 – Brazil, Argentina
- Noegus coccineus Simon, 1900 – Brazil
- Noegus comatulus Simon, 1900 – Brazil, Argentina
- Noegus difficilis (Soares & Camargo, 1948) – Brazil
- Noegus franganilloi (Caporiacco, 1947) – Guyana, French Guiana
- Noegus fulvocristatus Simon, 1900 – Brazil
- Noegus fuscimanus Simon, 1900 – Brazil
- Noegus fuscomanus (Taczanowski, 1878) – Peru
- Noegus lodovicoi Ruiz & Brescovit, 2008 – Guyana
- Noegus mantovani Bauab & Soares, 1978 – Brazil
- Noegus niger (Caporiacco, 1947) – Guyana
- Noegus niveogularis Simon, 1900 – Brazil
- Noegus niveomarginatus Simon, 1900 – Brazil, French Guiana
- Noegus pallidus (Mello-Leitão, 1947) – Brazil
- Noegus petrusewiczi Caporiacco, 1947 – Guyana
- Noegus rufus Simon, 1900 – Peru, Brazil
- Noegus spiralifer (F. O. Pickard-Cambridge, 1901) – Guatemala, Panama
- Noegus transversalis Simon, 1900 – Brazil, French Guiana
- Noegus trilineatus (Mello-Leitão, 1940) – Brazil, Guyana
- Noegus uncatus Simon, 1900 – Brazil
- Noegus vulpio Simon, 1900 (type) – Brazil, Guyana
