= Ibimirim =

Municipality of Pernambuco State, Brazil

- Municipality of Pernambuco, Brazil
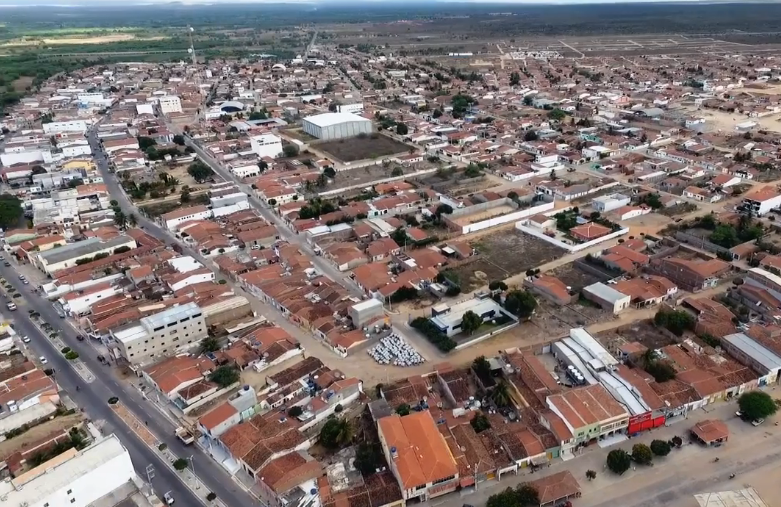
- Aerial view of Ibimirim

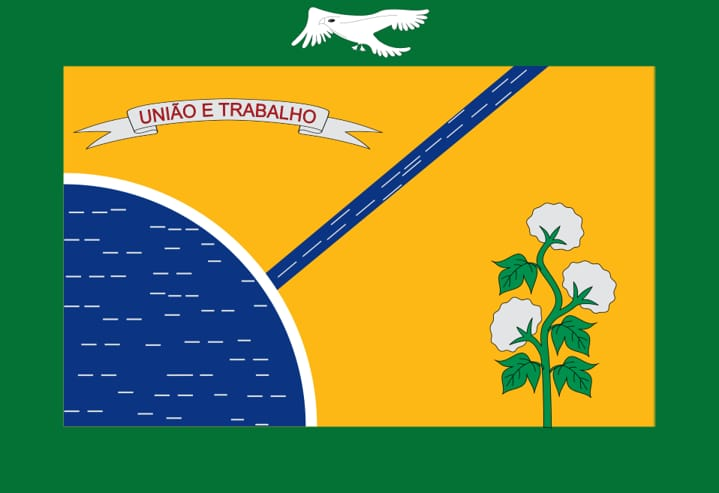
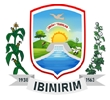
- Flag Coat of arms
- Etymology: Derived from the Tupi language, meaning "small earth"
- Motto(s): Brazilian Portuguese: União e trabalho English: Unity and work
- Location of Ibimirim in Pernambuco

- Location within Brazil Location within South America
- Coordinates: 8°32′26″S 37°41′25″W
- Country: Brazil
- Region: Northeast
- State: Pernambuco
- Founded: 20 December 1963

Government
  - Mayor: José Welliton de Melo Siqueira (PSDB) (2025-2028)
  - Vice Mayor: Jania Maria Delgado (PT) (2025-2028)

Area
  - Total: 1,929.338 km^{2} (744.922 sq mi)
- Elevation: 401 m (1,316 ft)

Population (2022 Census)
  - Total: 26,593
  - Estimate (2025): 28,825
  - Density: 14.13/km^{2} (36.6/sq mi)
- Demonym: Ibimiriense (Brazilian Portuguese)
- Time zone: UTC-03:00 (Brasília Time)
- Postal code: 56580-000, 56585-000
- HDI (2010): 0.552 – medium
- Website: ibimirim.pe.gov.br

Ibimirim (Central northeastern portuguese pronunciation: [ibimiˈɾĩˑ]) is a city in the state of Pernambuco, Brazil. The population in 2025, according to IBGE was 28,825 inhabitants and the total area is 1929.34 km².

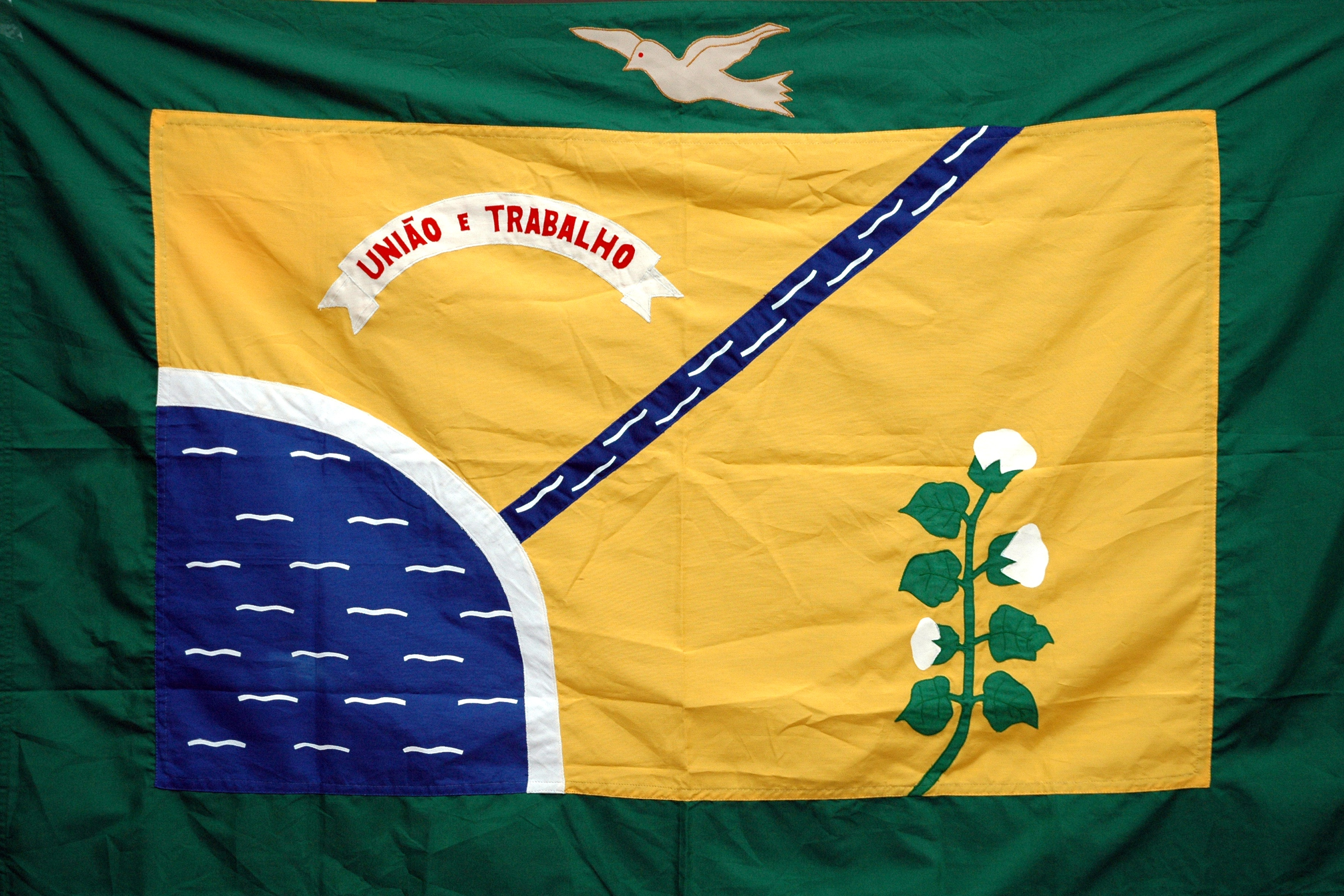
City Flag

== Geography ==
- State - Pernambuco
- Region - Sertão Pernambucano
- Boundaries - Custódia and Sertânia (N); Inajá and Manari (S); Tupanatinga (E); Floresta (W).
- Area - 2033.59 km²
- Elevation - 401 m
- Hydrography - Moxotó River
- Vegetation - Caatinga hiperxerófila
- Climate - semi arid - (Sertão) hot
- Annual average temperature - 24.7 c
- Distance to Recife - 331.6 km

== Economy ==
The main economic activities in Ibimirim are based in commerce and agribusiness, especially creation of goats, sheep, pigss, cattle, donkeys, horses, chickens; and plantations of tomatoes, beans, mangoes and bananas.

=== Economic indicators ===
Population	GDP x(1000 R$).	GDP pc (R$)	PE
29.018	96.928	3.556	0.16%

Economy by Sector 2006

Primary sector	Secondary sector	Service sector
23.45%	7.91%	68.64%

=== Health Indicators ===
HDI (2000)	Hospitals (2007)	Hospitals beds (2007)	Children's Mortality every 1000 (2005)
0.566	1	40	23.9

== See also ==
- List of municipalities in Pernambuco
