= Mago (spider) =

Scientific classification
- Kingdom: Animalia
- Phylum: Arthropoda
- Subphylum: Chelicerata
- Class: Arachnida
- Order: Araneae
- Infraorder: Araneomorphae
- Family: Salticidae
- Subfamily: Salticinae
- Genus: Mago; O. Pickard-Cambridge, 1882

Type species
- M. intentus O. Pickard-Cambridge, 1882

Species
- M. brimodes Ruiz & Maddison, 2019 – Ecuador; M. intentus O. Pickard-Cambridge, 1882 – Brazil? (Amazonia)

Genus of spiders

Mago is a genus of Ecuadorian jumping spiders that was first described by Octavius Pickard-Cambridge in 1882. As of July 2019 it contains only two species, found only in Ecuador: M. brimodes and M. intentus.
