= Iati, Pernambuco =

City in Pernambuco, Brazil

Iati
- Municipality of Pernambuco, Brazil
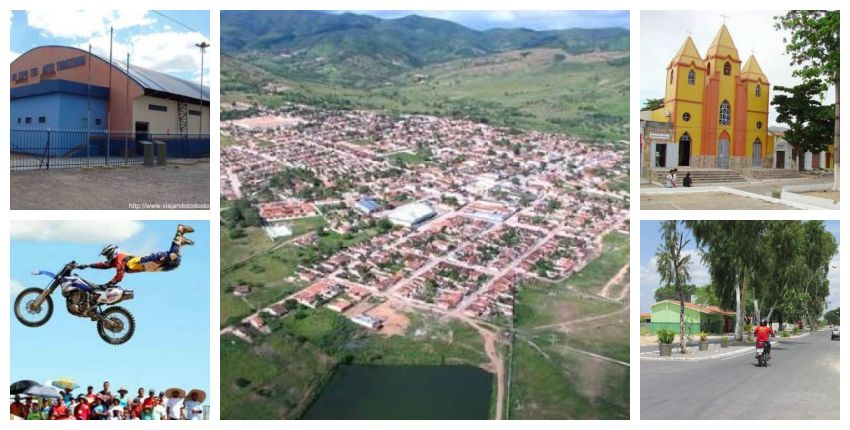
- Iati

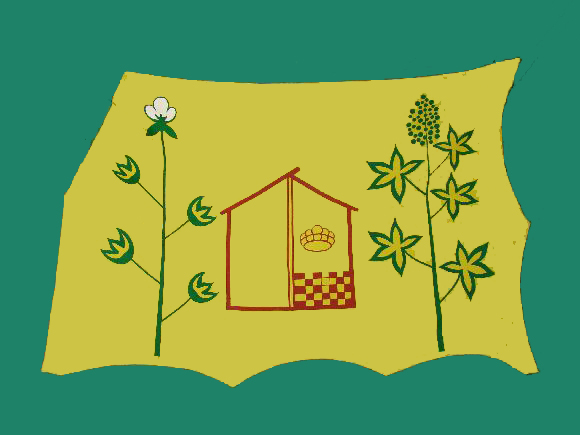
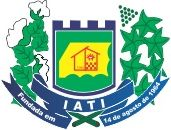
- Flag Coat of arms
- Etymology: Derived from the language of the Carijó and Tupiniquim indigenous people, meaning "New House"
- Location of Iati in Pernambuco

- Location within Brazil Location within South America
- Coordinates: 9°2′45″S 36°50′45″W
- Country: Brazil
- Region: Northeast
- State: Pernambuco
- Founded: 14 August 1964

Government
  - Mayor: Camila Aparecida Tenorio Souto de Souza (PSB) (2025-2028)
  - Vice Mayor: Marcos Paulo Ramos Tenorio (Agir) (2025-2028)

Area
  - Total: 635.137 km^{2} (245.228 sq mi)
- Elevation: 487 m (1,598 ft)

Population (2022 Census)
  - Total: 17,165
  - Estimate (2025): 17,570
  - Density: 27.03/km^{2} (70.0/sq mi)
- Demonym: Iatiense (Brazilian Portuguese)
- Time zone: UTC-03:00 (Brasília Time)
- Postal code: 55345-000, 55347-000
- HDI (2010): 0.528 – low
- Website: iati.pe.gov.br

Iati (Central northeastern portuguese pronunciation: [iaˈti]) is a city located in the state of Pernambuco, Brazil. It is located at 286 km away from Recife, capital of the state of Pernambuco. It has an estimated population of 17,165 inhabitants (2022 Census).

== Geography ==
- State - Pernambuco
- Region - Agreste Pernambucano
- Boundaries - Saloá (North); Alagoas state (South); Saloá and Bom Conselho (East); Águas Belas (West).
- Area - 635.14 km^{2}
- Elevation - 487 m
- Hydrography - Ipanema River
- Vegetation - Caatinga hiperxerófila
- Climate - Semi arid hot
- Annual average temperature - 24.2 c
- Distance to Recife - 286 km

== Economy ==
The main economic activities in Iati are in agribusiness, especially beans, manioc, corn; and livestock such as cattle, sheep, goats, pigs and poultry.

=== Economic indicators ===
Population	GDP x(1000 R$).	GDP pc (R$)	PE
18.350	50.668	2.857	0.084%

Economy by Sector 2006

Primary sector	Secondary sector	Service sector
15.93%	7.78%	76.29%

=== Health indicators ===
HDI (2000)	Hospitals (2007)	Hospitals beds (2007)	Children's Mortality every 1000 (2005)
0.526	1	30	35.2

== See also ==
- List of municipalities in Pernambuco
