= Terezinha, Pernambuco =

City in Brazil

Terezinha
- Municipality of Pernambuco, Brazil
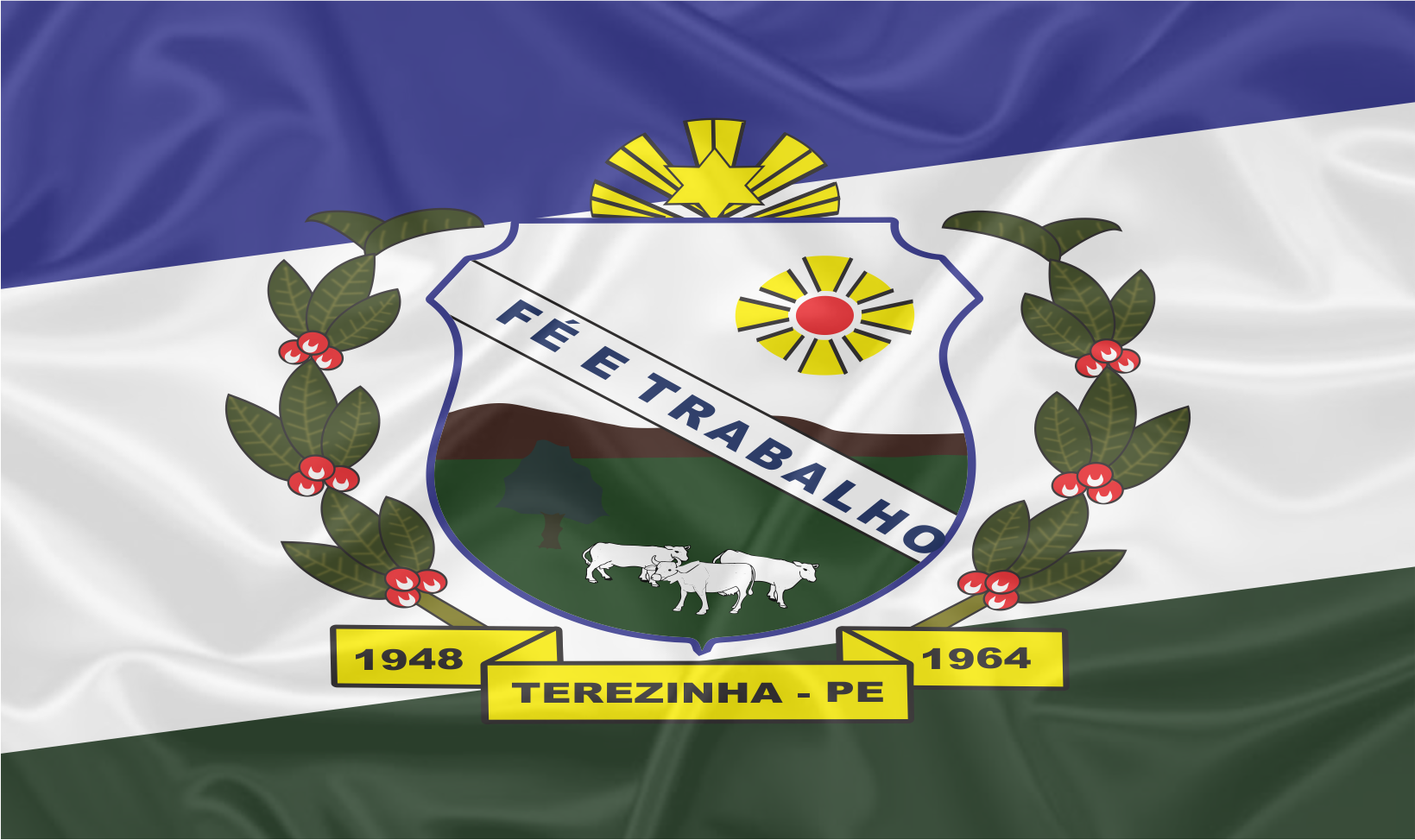
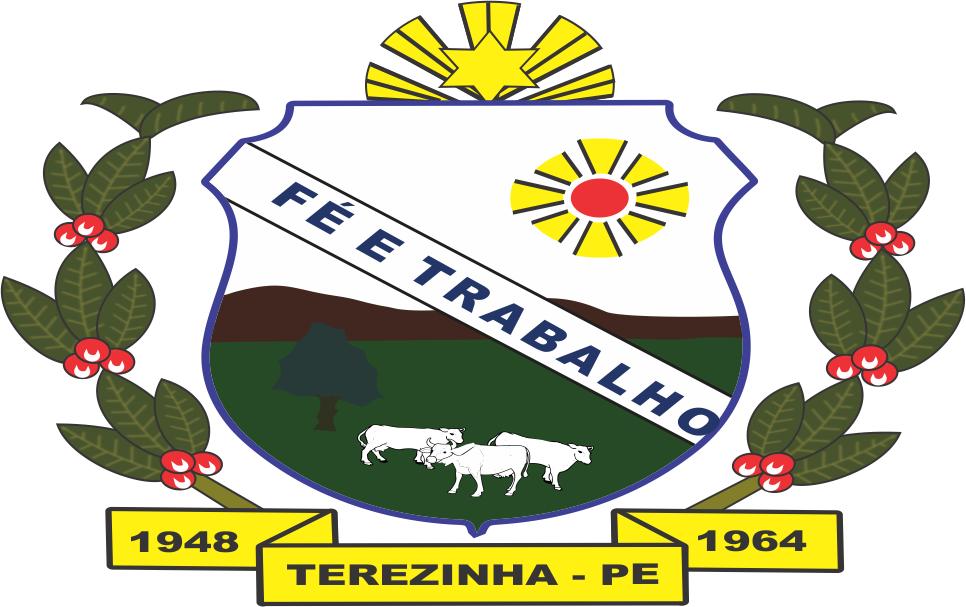
- Flag Coat of arms

- Location of Terezinha in Pernambuco

- Location within Brazil Location within South America
- Coordinates: 9°3′21″S 36°37′22″W
- Country: Brazil
- Region: Northeast
- State: Pernambuco
- Founded: 20 December 1963

Government
  - Mayor: Arnobio Gomes da Silva (Republicanos) (2025-2028)
  - Vice Mayor: Vitor Gustavo de Barros Gomes (Republicanos) (2025-2028)

Area
  - Total: 151.625 km^{2} (58.543 sq mi)
- Elevation: 736 m (2,415 ft)

Population (2022 Census)
  - Total: 6,513
  - Estimate (2025): 6,853
  - Density: 43/km^{2} (110/sq mi)
- Demonym: Terezinhense (Brazilian Portuguese)
- Time zone: UTC-03:00 (Brasília Time)
- Postal code: 55305-000
- HDI (2010): 0.545 – low
- Website: terezinha.pe.gov.br

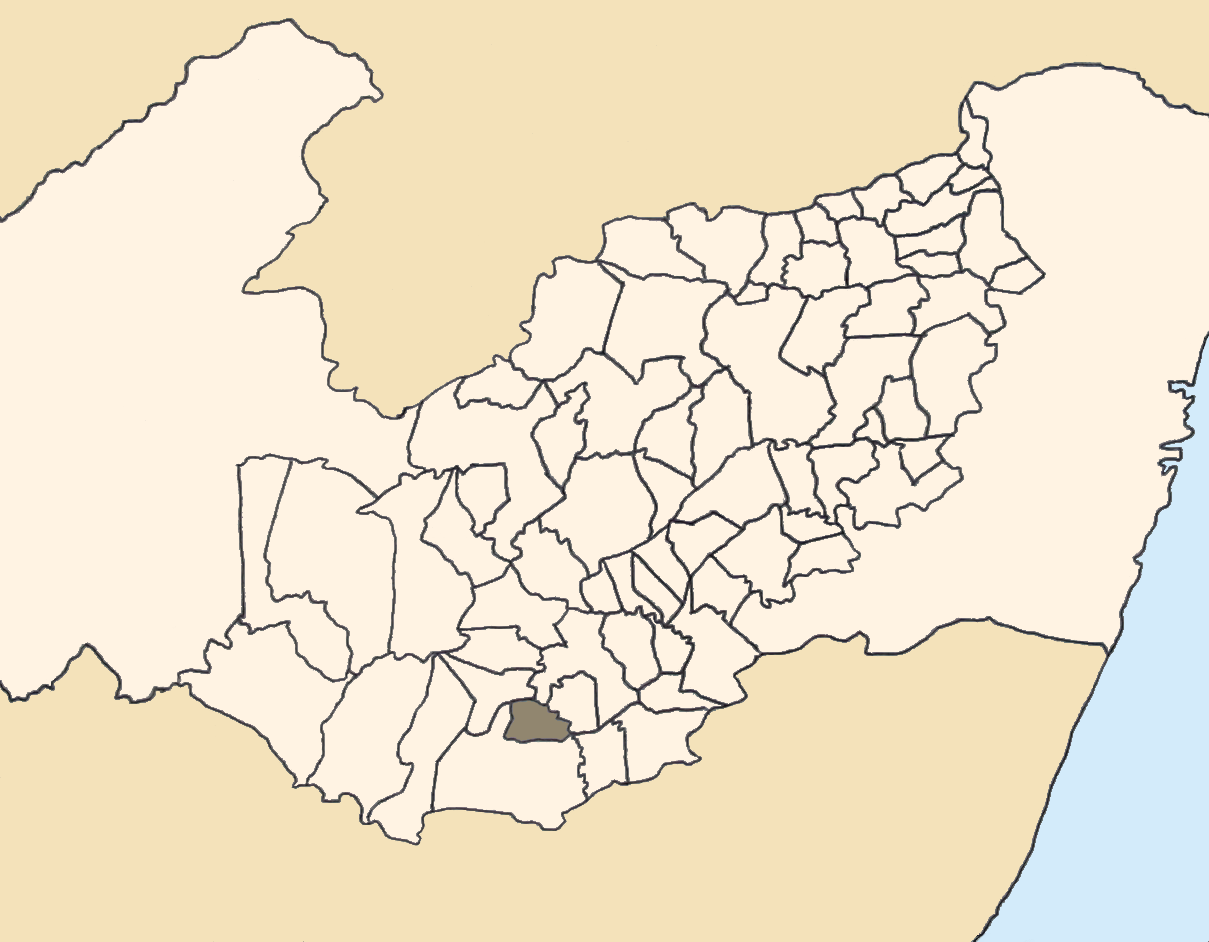
Location of Terezinha within Pernambuco.

Terezinha (Central northeastern portuguese pronunciation: [teɾeˈzĩj̃ɐ]) (Little Tereza) is a city located in the state of Pernambuco, Brazil. Located at 251 km away from Recife, capital of the state of Pernambuco, it has an estimated (IBGE 2025) population of 6,853 inhabitants.

== Geography ==
- State – Pernambuco
- Region – Agreste Pernambucano
- Boundaries – Garanhuns and Saloá (N); Bom Conselho (S and W); Brejão (E).
- Area – 151.45 km^{2} (58.48 sq mi)
- Elevation – 736 m
- Hydrography – Ipanema River
- Vegetation – Subcaducifólia forest
- Climate – Semi arid hot
- Annual average temperature – 26.0 c
- Distance to Recife – 251 km

== Economy ==
The main economic activities in Terezinha are based in agribusiness, especially beans, manioc, coffee; and livestock such as cattle and poultry.

=== Economic indicators ===
Population	GDP x(1000 R$).	GDP pc (R$)	PE
6.774	20.266	3.120	0.034%

Economy by Sector 2006

Primary sector	Secondary sector	Service sector
23.39%	7.91%	68.70%

=== Health indicators ===
HDI (2000)	Hospitals (2007)	Hospitals beds (2007)	Children's Mortality every 1000 (2005)
0.565	1	14	24.0

== See also ==
- List of municipalities in Pernambuco
