= Alagoinha =

Municipality of Pernambuco, Brazil

- Municipality
- Flag Coat of arms

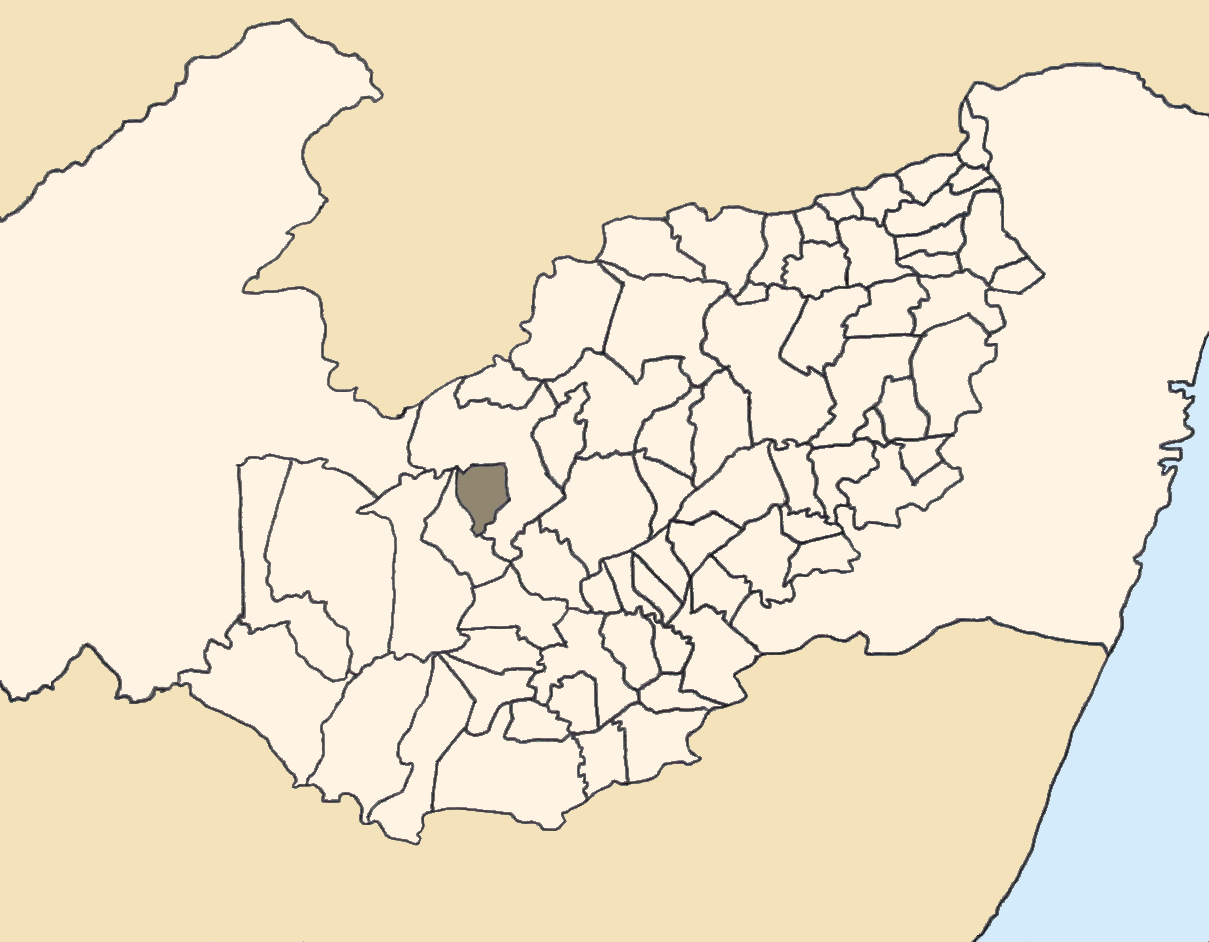
- Alagoinha in Pernambuco
- Coordinates: 12°20′0″S 42°7′0″W
- Country: Brazil
- State: Pernambuco

Area
  - Total: 200.42 km^{2} (77.38 sq mi)
- Elevation: 726 m (2,382 ft)

Population (2022 Census)
  - Total: 13,542
  - Estimate (2025): 14,460
  - Density: 67.568/km^{2} (175.00/sq mi)

Alagoinha (Central northeastern portuguese pronunciation: [alaɡoˈĩj̃ɐ(s)]) (Little Alagoas) is a Brazilian municipality in the state of Pernambuco. The name "Alagoinha" refers to the many small tanks, wells, cauldrons, and lagoons within the city. Nossa Senhora da Conceição Our Lady of Conceição is the patroness saint of the city. The church of Nossa Senhora da Conceição, which has a simple style, was built by German Franciscan friars in 1916. The city has a strong connection to the German culture.

== Geography ==
- State - Pernambuco
- Region - Agreste of Pernambuco
- Coordinates - 12°20′S 42°7′W
- Boundaries - Pesqueira (north and east); Venturosa (south and west).
- Area - 200.42 km^{2}
- Elevation - 726 m
- Hydrography - Ipojuca and Ipanema rivers
- Vegetation - Caatinga hiperxerófila
- Climate - Transition between tropical hot and humid and, semi arid hot and dry
- Annual average temperature - 21.6 c
- Distance to Recife - 225.5 km

== Tourism ==
The main tourist attractions of Alagoinha are the traditional parties at Christmas and Revellon (New Year's Eve), which have been celebrated for more than 150 years. Every year, the city attracts many visitors to its fishing grounds. The surrounding mountain ranges and the numerous lagoons and waterfalls appeal to nature lovers.

== Economy ==
The main economic activities in Alagoinha are related with tourism, commerce and agribusiness, especially the raising of cattle, goats, sheep, pigs, chickens; and the cultivation of beans, manioc and corn.

=== Economic indicators ===
Population	GDP x(1000 R$).	GDP pc (R$)	PE
14.913	43.114	3.076	0.062%

Economy by Sector 2006

Primary sector	Secondary sector	Service sector
12.47%	8.67%	78.86%

=== Health indicators ===
HDI (2000)	Hospitals (2007)	Hospitals beds (2007)	Children's Mortality every 1000 (2005)
0.630	---	---	19.0

== See also ==
- List of municipalities in Pernambuco
