= Pedra, Pernambuco =

Municipality of Pernambuco, Brazil

Pedra
- Municipality of Pernambuco, Brazil
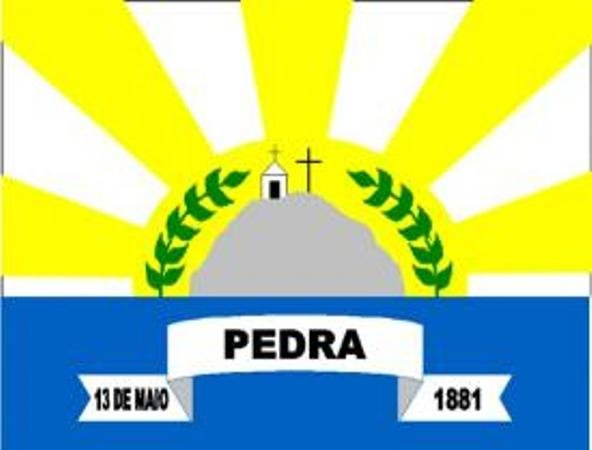
- Flag
- Etymology: In English "rock", due to the existence of a large rock near the city center
- Location of Pedra in Pernambuco

- Location within Brazil Location within South America
- Coordinates: 8°30′2″S 36°56′44″W
- Country: Brazil
- Region: Northeast
- State: Pernambuco
- Founded: 13 May 1881

Government
  - Mayor: Gilberto Júnior Wanderley Vaz (PV) (2025-2028)
  - Vice Mayor: Jocivan Neto Cavalcanti (PSD) (2025-2028)

Area
  - Total: 922.481 km^{2} (356.172 sq mi)
- Elevation: 593 m (1,946 ft)

Population (2022 Census)
  - Total: 22,795
  - Estimate (2025): 23,671
  - Density: 24.71/km^{2} (64.0/sq mi)
- Demonym: Pedrense (Brazilian Portuguese)
- Time zone: UTC-03:00 (Brasília Time)
- Postal code: 55280-000, 55284-000, 55285-000, 55287-000
- HDI (2010): 0.567 – medium
- Website: pedra.pe.gov.br

Pedra (Central northeastern portuguese pronunciation: [ˈpɛdɐ]) (stone) is a city located in the state of Pernambuco, Brazil. It is located at 255 km away from Recife, capital of the state of Pernambuco, and has an estimated (IBGE 2020) population of 22,668 inhabitants.

== Geography ==
- State - Pernambuco
- Region - Agreste Pernambucano
- Boundaries - Arcoverde and Pesqueira (N); Águas Belas (S); Caetés, Paranatama and Venturosa (E); Buique (W)
- Area - 803.02 km^{2}
- Elevation - 593 m
- Hydrography - Ipanema River
- Vegetation - Caatinga Hipoxerófila
- Climate - Semi arid - hot
- Annual average temperature - 22.9 c
- Distance to Recife - 255.4 km

== Economy ==
The main economic activities in Pedra are based in commerce and agribusiness, especially manioc, beans, tomatoes, corn; and livestock such as cattle, pigs, sheep, goats, horses and chickens.

=== Economic indicators ===
Population	GDP x(1000 R$).	GDP pc (R$)	PE
20.788	91.010	4.521	0.15%

Economy by Sector 2006

Primary sector	Secondary sector	Service sector
30.53%	10.35%	59.12%

=== Health indicators ===
HDI (2000)	Hospitals (2007)	Hospitals beds (2007)	Children's Mortality every 1000 (2005)
0.601	1	24	40.4

== See also ==
- List of municipalities in Pernambuco
