= Caetés, Pernambuco =

Municipality of Pernambuco, Brazil

Caetés
- Municipality

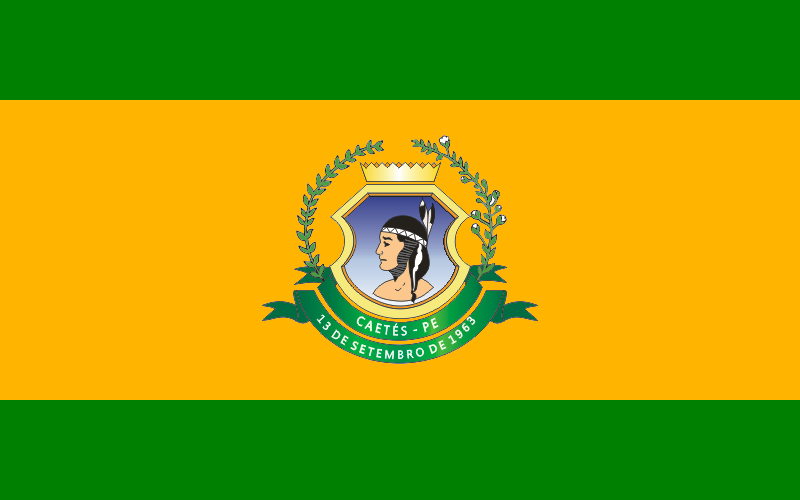
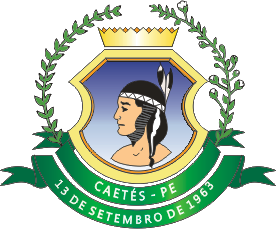
- Flag Coat of arms

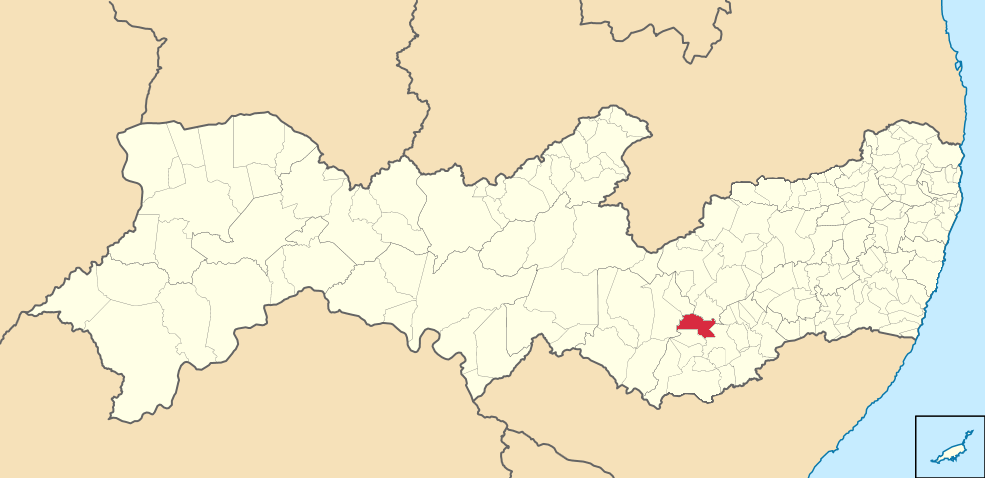
- Location in Pernambuco

- Location in Brazil
- Coordinates: 08°46′22″S 36°37′22″W
- Country: Brazil
- Region: Northeast
- State: Pernambuco
- Mesoregion: Agreste Pernambucano
- Microregion: Garanhuns
- Founded: August 18, 1943
- Incorporated (municipality): December 13, 1963

Government
  - Mayor: Nivaldo da Silva Martins

Area
  - Total: 330.472 km^{2} (127.596 sq mi)
- Elevation: 849 m (2,785 ft)

Population (2022 Census)
  - Total: 28,827
  - Estimate (2025): 30,571
  - Density: 8.71/km^{2} (22.6/sq mi)
- Demonym: caeteense
- Time zone: UTC−3 (BRT)
- CEP postal code: 55360-000
- Area code: 87
- HDI (2010): 0.522
- Website: Official website

Caetés (Brazilian Portuguese pronunciation: [ka.eˈtɛs]) is a Brazilian municipality located within the state of Pernambuco, in northeastern Brazil. The city belongs to the mesoregion of Agreste Pernambucano and microregion of Garanhuns. The name originates from the indigenous Caetés people who lived in Pernambuco in the 16th century. Caetés is notable for being the birthplace of Brazilian president Luiz Inácio Lula da Silva on 27 October 1945 at the time it was considered part of Garanhuns.

== Geography ==
- State: Pernambuco
- Region: Agreste (Pernambuco)
- Borders: Venturosa (N); Paranatama (S); Garanhuns and Capoeiras (E); Pedra (W)
- Area: 330.5 km^{2}
- Elevation: 849 m
- Hydrography: Mundaú, Ipanema and Una rivers
- Vegetation: Caatinga Hiperxerófila
- Climate: Mesothermal
- Annual average temperature: 20.6 °C
- Main roads: BR 101, BR 423 and BR 424
- Distance to Recife: 249 km

== Economy ==
The main economic activities in Caetés are based in general commerce and the primary sector, which employs around 83% of the local workforce. The main products are especially manioc, beans, cattle and milk.

=== Economic Indicators ===
Population	GDP x(1000 R$).	GDP pc (R$)	PE
26.386	69.567	2.759	0.115%

Economy by Sector 2006

Primary sector	Secondary sector	Service sector
18.89%	7.83%	73.22%

=== Health Indicators ===
HDI (2000)	Hospitals (2007)	Hospital beds (2007)	Infant mortality per 1000 (2005)
0.521	1	29	23.2

== See also ==
- List of municipalities in Pernambuco
