= Paranatama =

Municipality in Pernambuco, Brazil

- Municipality of Pernambuco, Brazil
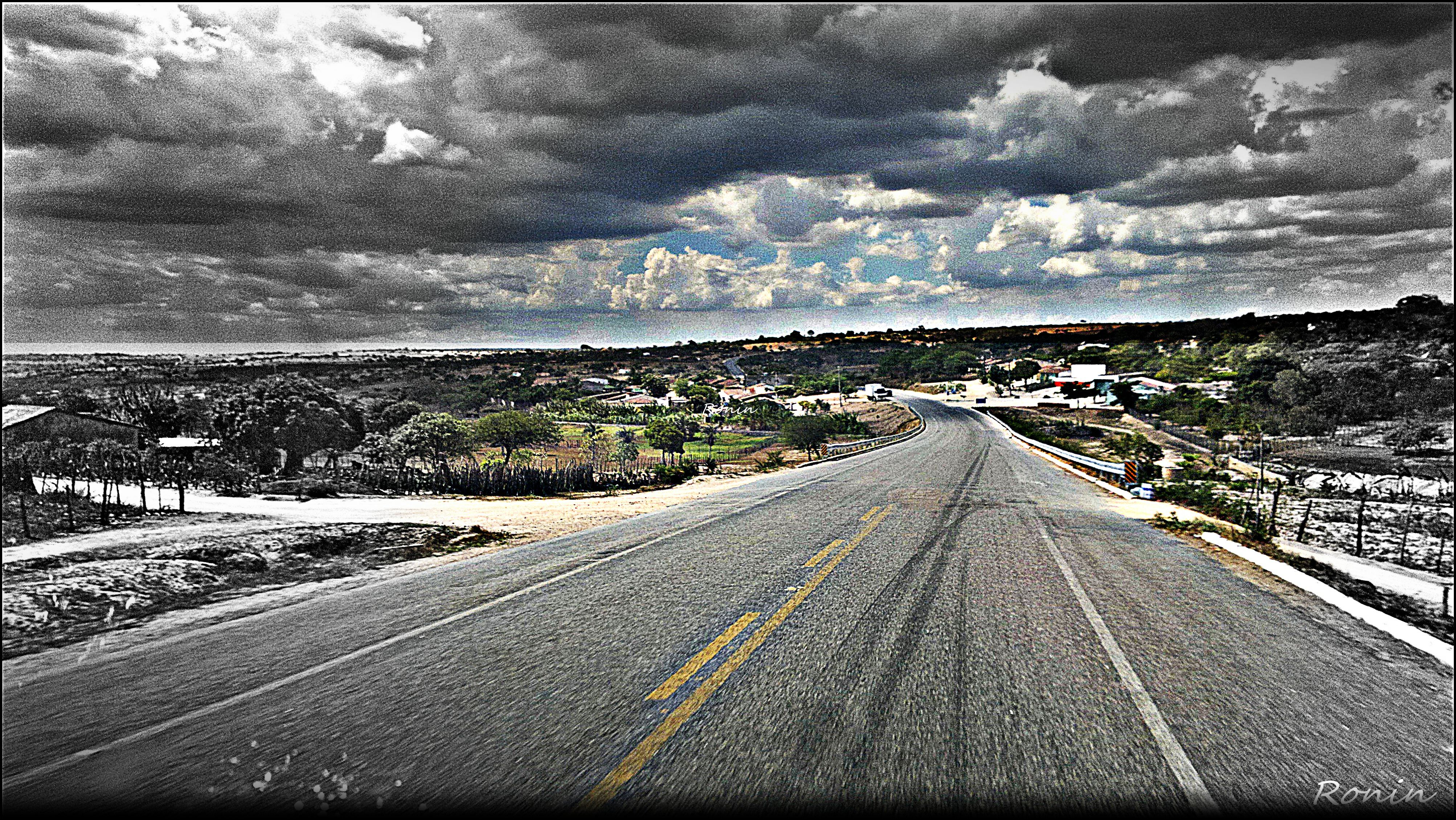
- BR-423 in Paranatama

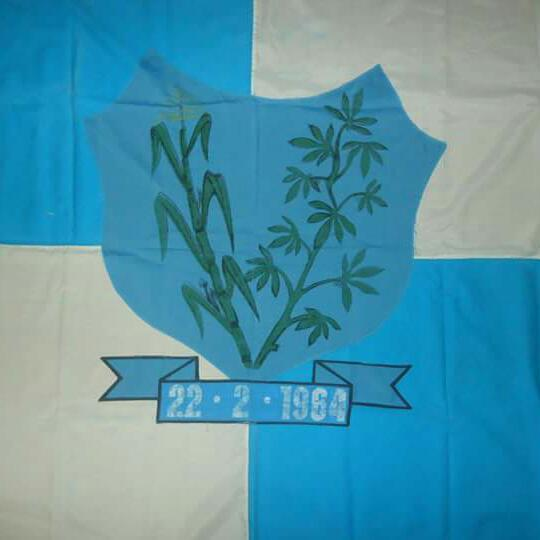
- Flag

- Location of Paranatama in Pernambuco

- Location within Brazil Location within South America
- Coordinates: 8°55′15″S 36°39′29″W
- Country: Brazil
- Region: Northeast
- State: Pernambuco
- Founded: 20 December 1963

Government
  - Mayor: Henrique de Oliveira Gois (MDB) (2025-2028)
  - Vice Mayor: Enilda Leonel Pereira (Republicanos) (2025-2028)

Area
  - Total: 185.371 km^{2} (71.572 sq mi)
- Elevation: 879 m (2,884 ft)

Population (2022 Census)
  - Total: 12,199
  - Estimate (2025): 12,778
  - Density: 65.81/km^{2} (170.4/sq mi)
- Demonym: Paranatamense (Brazilian Portuguese)
- Time zone: UTC-03:00 (Brasília Time)
- Postal code: 55355-000
- HDI (2010): 0.537 – low
- Website: paranatama.pe.gov.br

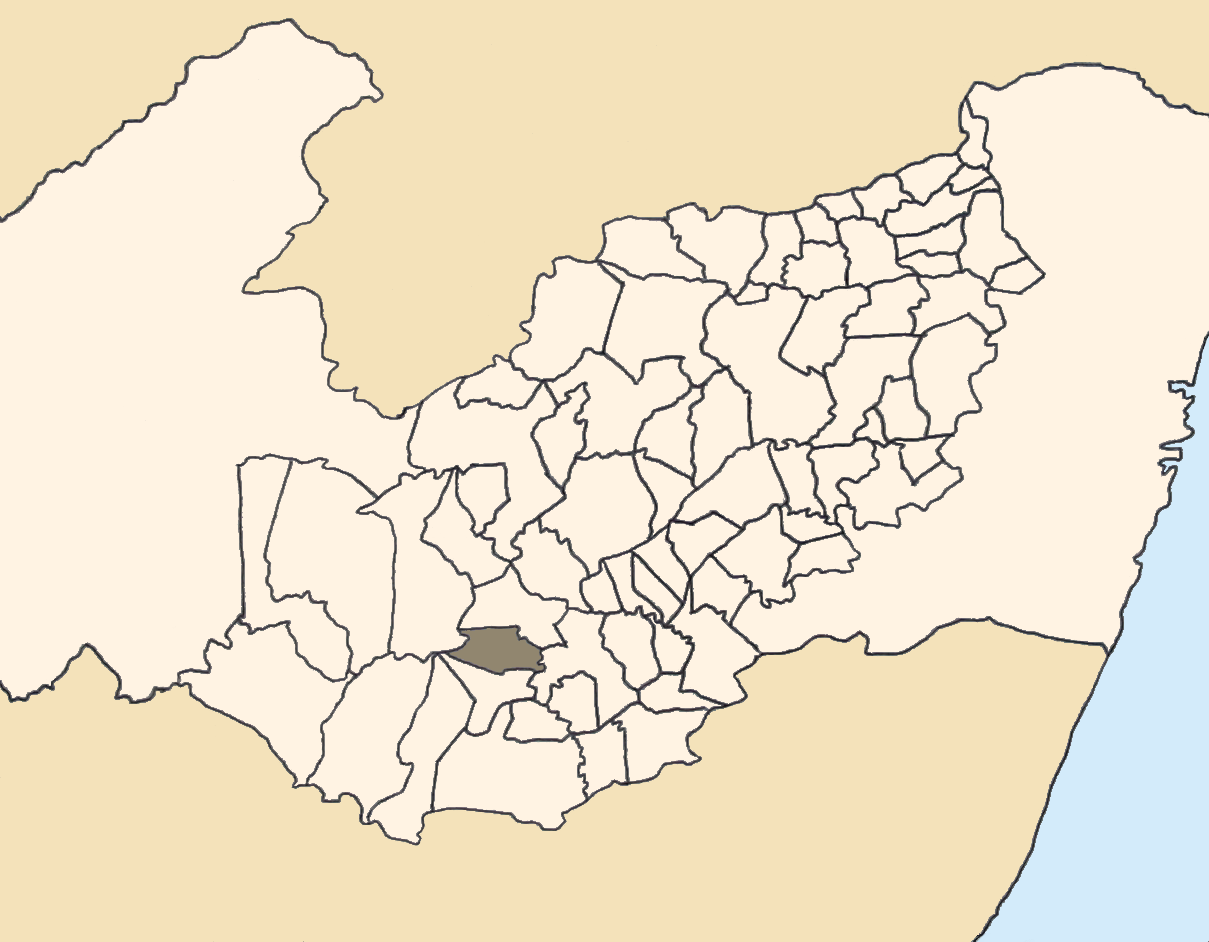
Paranatama in Pernambuco.

Paranatama (Central northeastern portuguese pronunciation: [pɐɾɐnaˈtɐ̃mɐ]) is a municipality/city in the state of Pernambuco in Brazil. The population in 2025 was 12,778 and the total area is 185.37 km^{2}.

== Geography ==
- State - Pernambuco
- Region - Agreste of Pernambuco
- Boundaries - Caetés (N); Saloá (S); Garanhuns (E); Pedra (W).
- Area - 185.37 km^{2}
- Elevation - 879 m
- Hydrography - Mundaú River
- Vegetation - Caatinga hipoxerófila
- Climate - Transition between tropical hot and humid and, semi arid hot
- Annual average temperature - 20.8 c
- Distance to Recife - 192 km

== Economy ==
The main economic activity in Paranatama is agribusiness, especially cattle, goat, pig, sheep, and chicken farming; and plantations of beans, manioc, coffee and corn.

=== Economic Indicators ===
Population	GDP x(1000 R$).	GDP pc (R$)	PE
12.441	37.227	3.190	0.06%

Economy by Sector 2006

Primary sector	Secondary sector	Service sector
21.52%	8.69%	69.79%

=== Health Indicators ===
HDI (2000)	Hospitals (2007)	Hospitals beds (2007)	Children's Mortality every 1000 (2005)
0.561	1	8	7.6

== See also ==
- List of municipalities in Pernambuco
