= Carlos Siqueira =

Brazilian lawyer and politician

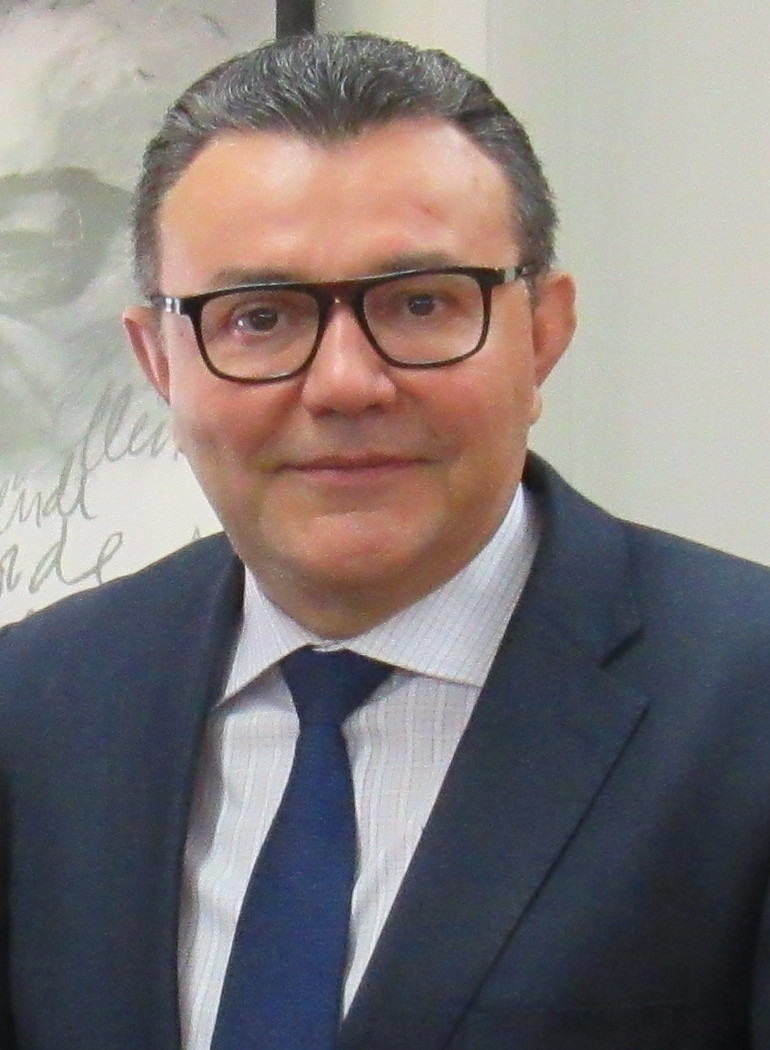

President of the Brazilian Socialist Party
- In office 13 October 2014 – 1 June 2025
- Preceded by: Eduardo Campos
- Succeeded by: João Campos

Personal details
- Born: 25 January 1955 (age 71) Bom Conselho, Pernambuco, Brazil
- Party: PSB
- Occupation: Lawyer and politician

Carlos Siqueira (born 25 January 1955 in Bom Conselho) is a Brazilian lawyer and politician who served, from 2014 to 2025, as national president of the Brazilian Socialist Party (PSB). Besides his high position in the party, he never ran for any political office. Siqueira had served as president of João Mangabeira Foundation, the PSB think tank, and was member of the Order of Attorneys of Brazil section of Pernambuco.

== PSB President ==
=== Party leadership ===
Siqueira was the party's secretary-general and served as campaign coordinator of Eduardo Campos in 2014, whom he was a right-hand man. As Campos headed the party since 2004, the presidency became vacant due to his death in a plane crash during the campaign. At the time, Roberto Amaral assumed as acting president while Marina Silva replaced Campos in the election.

As Silva became the party's nominee for President of Brazil, Siqueira stepped out of the electoral committee. He criticized the lack of programmatic compromise of Silva on Campos' ideals and rebelled against a supposed new centralized tendency of Silva about the party: "Let her be the boss on her party. As she's in an institution as hostess, she has to respect the institution. We rule in PSB."

Critical of Marina Silva, the election of Siqueira to the party's National Executive represented a reversal to the position adopted by the presidential candidate in the runoff of the 2014 presidential election, when Silva endorsed PSDB candidate, senator Aécio Neves (MG). As president Dilma Rousseff (PT) was reelected, there was a speculation that the party would be part of the opposition group. However, Siqueira defended a less assertive stance about the party withdrawal of the PSDB-lead coalition. On the other head, once taking office in the party leadership, Siqueira tried to appease the relationship with Marina Silva's ecologist group and invited the partisans of Sustainability Network to stay in the party.

=== Approach with the Workers' Party ===
During the PSB 14th National Congress, held prior to the 2018 general election, it was expected a contesting to Siqueira's presidency from Márcio França group, but he withdrew from his candidacy, which allowed the reelection of Carlos Siqueira. One more time, Siqueira wanted to distance the Socialist Party from PSDB. Through a resolution, the party decided not enter the "To Unite Brazil" coalition, led by São Paulo governor Geraldo Alckmin and, in case they would not launch a candidate, the party would join a left-wing coalition.

Even the traditional PSB base, Recife, had a hot runoff between both PT and PSB in the 2020 mayoral election, Siqueira had a fundamental role in the membership of former Maranhão governor Flávio Dino (PCdoB), Rio de Janeiro federal deputy Marcelo Freixo (PSOL) and former São Paulo governor Geraldo Alckmin (PSDB) to the party in a preparation for an alliance with the Workers' Party for the 2022 elections. However, Siqueira refused a partisan federation between the two parties, affirming that such project was "[an] absolutely case closed".

Party political offices
Preceded by Roberto Amaral (acting)	PSB National President; 2014–present	Incumbent
