= Jailson Mendes =

Brazilian porn actor and YouTuber

- Jailson Mendes in the performance that became an Internet meme
- Born: Jocione Mendonça; 19 February 1970; Iati, Brazil
- Died: 29 June 2018 (aged 48); São Paulo, Brazil
- Other name: Pai de Família
- Occupations: Porn actor, YouTuber

Jocione Mendonça (19 February 1970 – 29 June 2018), better known as Jailson Mendes and sometimes Pai de Família, was a Brazilian porn actor and YouTuber. He became an Internet meme for his performance in a pornographic film where he loudly moans the phrase "Ai, que delícia, cara" (literally "Oh, what a delight, man", or "Oh, that feels so good, man"). Retired due to health issues, Mendonça was invited to act in pornographic films while he was in São Paulo and ended up making three of them. Due to his acting style, along with his phrase, he became an Internet phenomenon. Although he initially feared the repercussions, Mendonça later became used to his popularity. To change his image as a pornographic actor, he created a channel on YouTube with videos about video games and cooking.

Mendonça died on 29 June 2018, from a heart attack. He was considered one of the greatest Brazilian memes and one of the icons of Brazilian gay pornography. Some used Mendonça's character as a prank in news programs.

== Biography ==
=== Personal life ===
Jocione Mendonça was born in Iati on 19 February 1970. He studied until the fifth grade and moved to São Paulo at the age of seventeen. He worked as a production assistant, but due to muscular dystrophy in the spine region—a problem that led him to undergo surgery—and a chronic condition of kidney failure, he had to retire prematurely. Mendonça also suffered from high blood pressure. He lived with another man for seventeen years and had no children.

=== Pornographic films ===
In 2005, Mendonça was in a square in São Paulo when a couple approached him and invited him to participate in a pornographic film. According to him, the couple said: "What if you, who are kind of a bear, made a gay porn film for us?" He was suspicious but accepted. He said he had to gain weight to, in the words of UOL's Leonardo Rodrigues, "embody an even more convincing 'bear'". In total, Mendonça made three films in his career, using the stage name "Jailson Mendes". The first of them was made for a minimum wage fee and the last for one hundred reais "to help a friend who was going bankrupt". Ícaro Studios produced the three films.

In one of these films, Mendonça's "hysterically bizarre performance", according to Rodrigues, became one of the most widely spread memes on the Internet in Brazil. During the performance, Mendonça drinks orange juice and says "ai, que delícia, cara" ("oh, what a delight, man"). Mendonça also received the nickname "Pai de Família" (Family Man). Shortly after the meme's popularity, Jocione was scared by the exposure, which included his family and friends, and quickly deleted his social media profiles. He also declared that he was afraid of being "stoned" and cursed on the street. According to Mendonça, "You do a type of work for a specific audience, and then you see a lot of people who have nothing to do with that world saying 'oh, what a delight', who are my fans. You get lost, right? I was scared". However, he said that the public began to calm him, and he became used to his popularity after a few days.

According to Karine Seimoha of iG, Mendonça reflected on his pornographic career, feeling that "it was all just a joke, made out of curiosity to see the erotic film industry up close", and made it clear that he never had any kind of relationship with Ícaro Studios. As for the nickname "Pai de Família" ("Family Man"), Mendonça explained that when he discovered he had become a meme, it already existed: "I believe they created it because of the way I was dressed in the movie. A family man who was in need and did that to support his family". According to Rangel Querino of Observatório G, Mendonça was "one of the greatest icons of national gay pornography".

=== Continued popularity ===
At the end of 2014, Mendonça created a YouTube channel about cooking, containing double-entendre jokes, which had almost 200,000 subscribers and four million views by the end of 2016. Among the videos, he features a reunion with Paulo Guina, with whom he acted in one of his films. Mendonça explained that a production company, Freedom, had contacted him and suggested the channel to change his image of a porn actor. Later, he started publishing gameplay videos of games such as Grand Theft Auto V, at the request of fans, who were mostly teenagers. In an interview, he declared that one of the ideas of the channel was "to show that being homosexual is not an aberration or disease. That a straight man can be friends with a gay man. And that a gay man doesn't have to act effeminate, talk high-pitched, like a woman".

The Jailson Mendes character was used as a prank in news programs. In July 2017, César Tralli, then presenter of TV Globo's SP1, was deceived by a viewer who used the character's photo on the program. In April 2018, on the same show, a similar situation occurred with the presenter Carlos Tramontina, who read a question from a user named "Jailson Mendes".

== Death ==
On 29 June 2018, Mendonça suffered a heart attack and was taken to Planalto Hospital in São Paulo but died shortly thereafter. The news of his death was announced by family and friends. The following day, a note of condolence was posted on his official Twitter account, which, according to Gilmar Lopes of E-farsas, "left the internet in mourning".
