= Saloá =

City in Pernambuco, Brazil

- Municipality of Pernambuco, Brazil
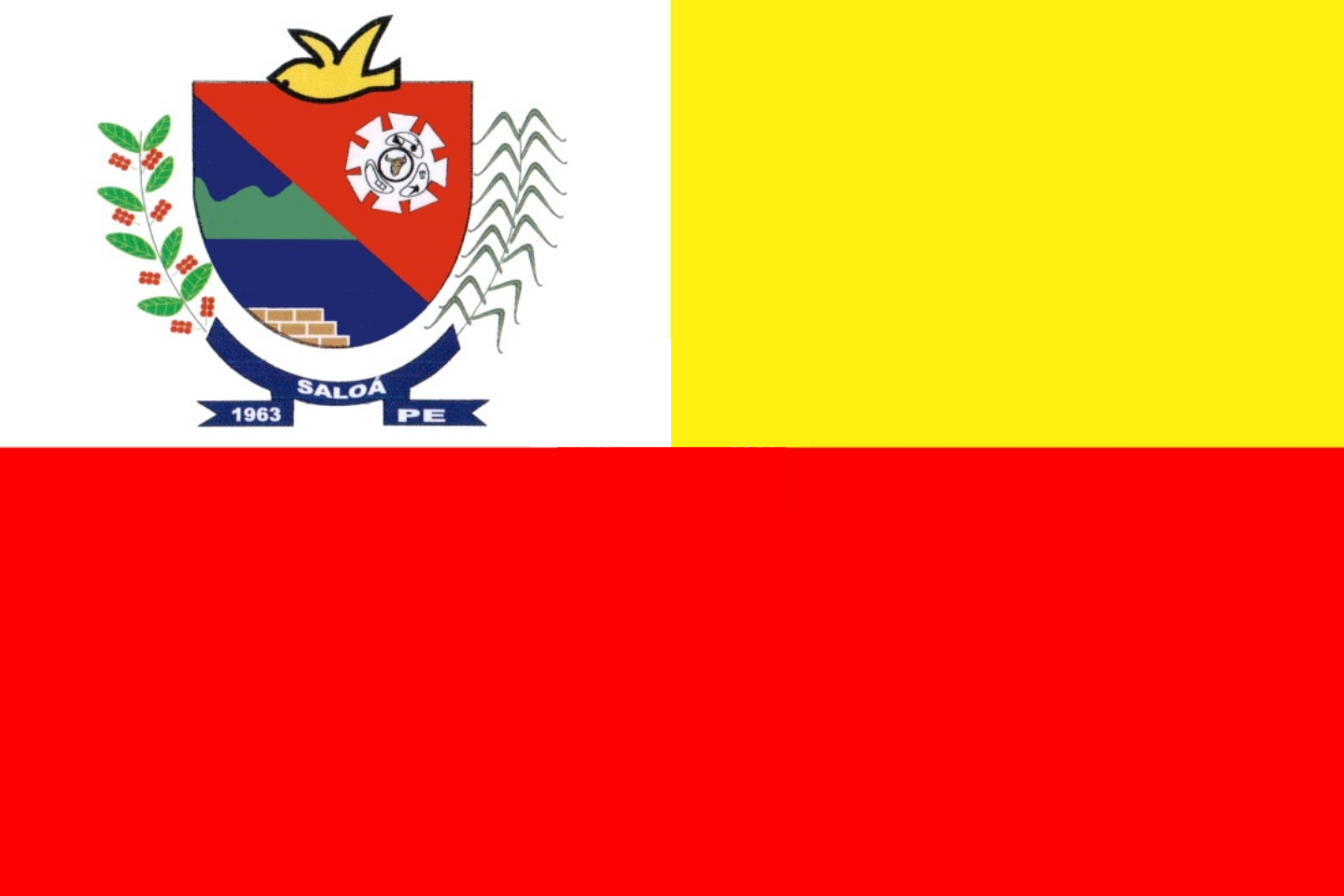
- Flag

- Location of Saloá in Pernambuco

- Location within Brazil Location within South America
- Coordinates: 8°58′33″S 36°41′16″W
- Country: Brazil
- Region: Northeast
- State: Pernambuco
- Founded: 20 December 1963

Government
  - Mayor: Rivaldo Alves de Souza Junior (PSDB) (2025-2028)
  - Vice Mayor: Cosme Oliveira de Melo (PSD) (2025-2028)

Area
  - Total: 251.550 km^{2} (97.124 sq mi)
- Elevation: 745 m (2,444 ft)

Population (2022 Census)
  - Total: 13,836
  - Estimate (2025): 14,125
  - Density: 55/km^{2} (140/sq mi)
- Demonym: Saloaense (Brazilian Portuguese)
- Time zone: UTC-03:00 (Brasília Time)
- Postal code: 55350-000, 55353-000, 55354-000
- HDI (2010): 0.559 – medium
- Website: saloa.pe.gov.br

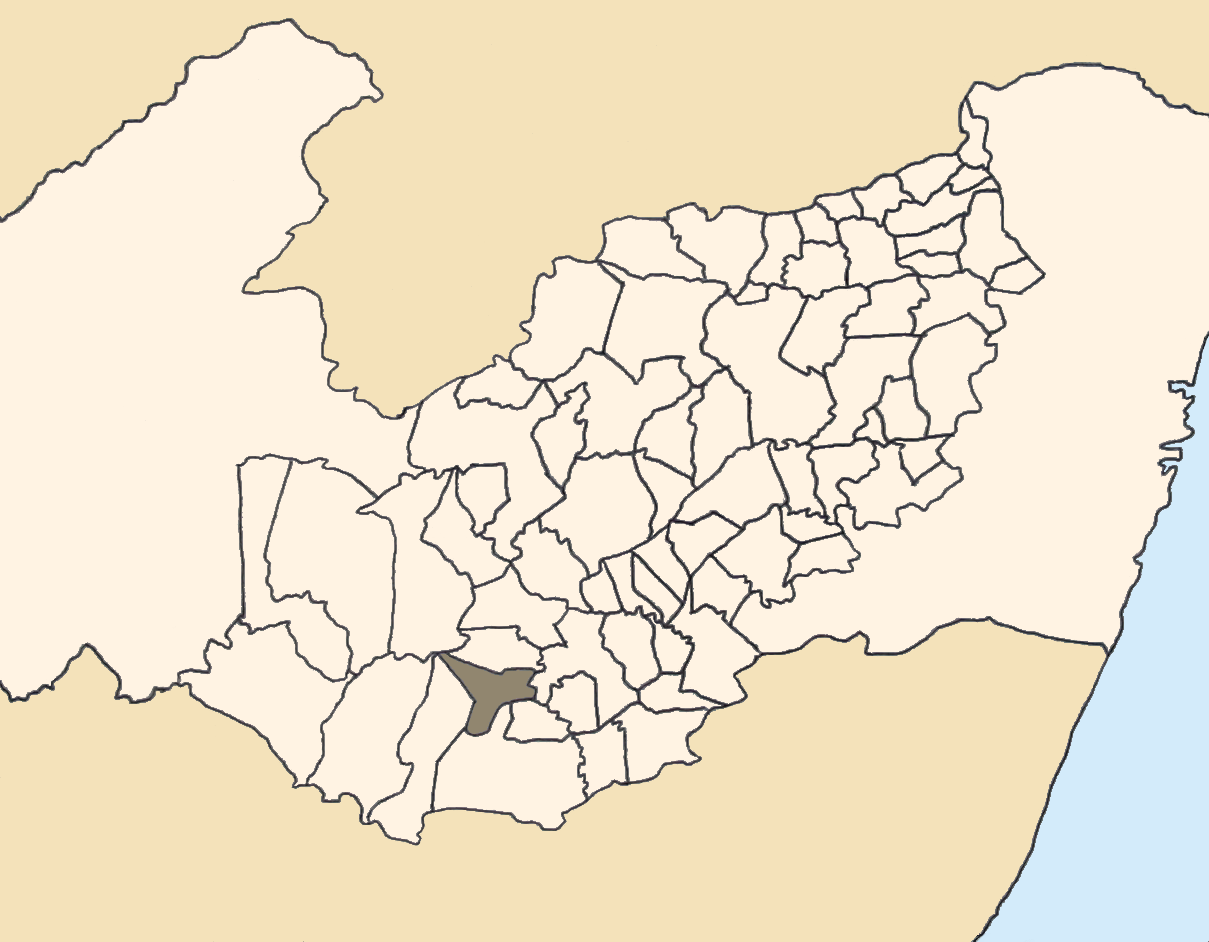
Location of Saloá within Pernambuco.

Saloá (Central northeastern portuguese pronunciation: [sɐloˈa]) is a city in the state of Pernambuco, Brazil. It is 263 km away from the state capital Recife, and has an estimated (IBGE 2020) population of 15,862 inhabitants.

== Geography ==
- State - Pernambuco
- Region - Agreste Pernambucano
- Boundaries - Paranatama (N); Bom Conselho and Terezinha (S); Garanhuns (E); Iati (W)
- Area - 252.08 km^{2}
- Elevation - 745 m
- Hydrography - Ipanema River
- Vegetation - Caatinga Hipoxerófila
- Climate - Semi arid - hot
- Annual average temperature - 20.6 c
- Distance to Recife - 263 km

== Economy ==
The main economic activities in Saloá are based in commerce and agribusiness, especially manioc, beans, tomatoes, coffee; and livestock such as cattle, sheep and poultry.

=== Economic indicators ===
Population	GDP x(1000 R$).	GDP pc (R$)	PE
15.547	46.893	3.121	0.08%

Economy by Sector 2006

Primary sector	Secondary sector	Service sector
16.39%	8.04%	75.57%

=== Health indicators ===
HDI (2000)	Hospitals (2007)	Hospitals beds (2007)	Children's Mortality every 1000 (2005)
0.561	1	19	50

== See also ==
- List of municipalities in Pernambuco
