= Venturosa =

Municipality of Pernambuco, Brazil

- City
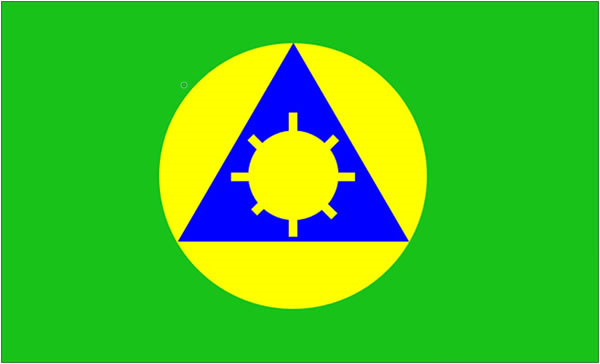
- Flag

- Venturosa located in Brazil Map
- Coordinates: 8°34′29″S 36°52′27″W
- Country: Brazil
- State: Pernambuco
- Region: Agreste

Area
  - Total: 338.12 km^{2} (130.55 sq mi)
- Elevation: 530 m (1,740 ft)

Population (2022 Census)
  - Total: 17,251
  - Estimate (2025): 17,563
- Time zone: UTC−3 (BRT)

Venturosa(Central northeastern portuguese pronunciation: [vẽtuˈɾɔzɐ]) is a city in northeastern Brazil, in the state of Pernambuco. It lies in the mesoregion of Agreste of Pernambuco and has 338.12 sq/km of total area.

== Geography ==
- State - Pernambuco
- Region - Agreste of Pernambuco
- Boundaries - Caetés and Capoeiras (S); Pesqueira and Alagoinha (E); Pedra (W).
- Area - 338.12 km^{2}
- Elevation - 530 m
- Hydrography - Ipojuca, Ipanema and Una rivers
- Vegetation - Caatinga Hipoxerófila
- Annual average temperature - 23.4 c
- Distance to Recife - 243 km

== Economy ==
The main economic activities in Venturosa are industry, commerce and agribusiness, especially beans, corn; and farming of cattle, sheep, goats, pigs and chickens.

=== Economic Indicators ===
Population	GDP x(1000 R$).	GDP pc (R$)	PE
16.706	58.989	3.787	0.096%

Economy by Sector (2006)

Primary sector	Secondary sector	Service sector
24.13%	8.37%	67.50%

=== Health Indicators ===
HDI (2000)	Hospitals (2007)	Hospitals beds (2007)	Children's Mortality every 1000 (2005)
0.633	1	24	18.1

== See also ==
- List of municipalities in Pernambuco
