= Brejão =

Municipality in Pernambuco, Brazil

- Municipality of Pernambuco, Brazil
- Flag Coat of arms

- Location of Brejão in Pernambuco

- Location within Brazil Location within South America
- Coordinates: 9°1′48″S 36°34′8″W
- Country: Brazil
- Region: Northeast
- State: Pernambuco
- Founded: 31 December 1958

Government
  - Mayor: Saulo Henrique Florentino de Barros (PP) (2025-2028)
  - Vice Mayor: Cicero Luiz Bezerra (Republicanos) (2025-2028)

Area
  - Total: 159.786 km^{2} (61.694 sq mi)
- Elevation: 788 m (2,585 ft)

Population (2022 Census)
  - Total: 9,079
  - Estimate (2025): 9,417
  - Density: 56.82/km^{2} (147.2/sq mi)
- Demonym: Brejonense (Brazilian Portuguese)
- Time zone: UTC-03:00 (Brasília Time)
- Postal code: 55325-000
- HDI (2010): 0.547 – low
- Website: brejao.pe.gov.br

Brejão (Central northeastern portuguese pronunciation: [bɾɛˈʒɐ̃w]) is a municipality/city in the state of Pernambuco in Brazil. The population in 2022 Census was 9,079 and the total area is 159.786 km^{2}.

== Geography ==
- State - Pernambuco
- Region - Agreste of Pernambuco
- Boundaries - Garanhuns (N and E); Lagoa do Carro (S); Terezinha (W).
- Area - 159.79 km^{2}
- Elevation - 788 m
- Hydrography - Mundaú River
- Vegetation - Subcaducifólia forest
- Climate - Tropical hot and humid
- Annual average temperature - 22.0 c
- Distance to Recife - 244 km

== Economy ==
The main economic activities in Brejão are related with agribusiness, especially creations of cattle; and plantations of beans, manioc, coffee and tobacco.

=== Economic Indicators ===
| Population | GDP x(1000 R$). | GDP pc (R$) | PE |
|---|---|---|---|
| 9.780 | 43.489 | 4.656 | 0.073% |

Economy by Sector 2006

| Primary sector | Secondary sector | Service sector |
|---|---|---|
| 28.99% | 16.88% | 54.13% |

=== Health Indicators ===
| HDI (2000) | Hospitals (2007) | Hospitals beds (2007) | Children's Mortality every 1000 (2005) |
|---|---|---|---|
| 0.569 | 1 | 8 | 28.2 |

== See also ==
- List of municipalities in Pernambuco
