= Bom Conselho =

Municipality in Pernambuco, Brazil

- Municipality of Pernambuco, Brazil
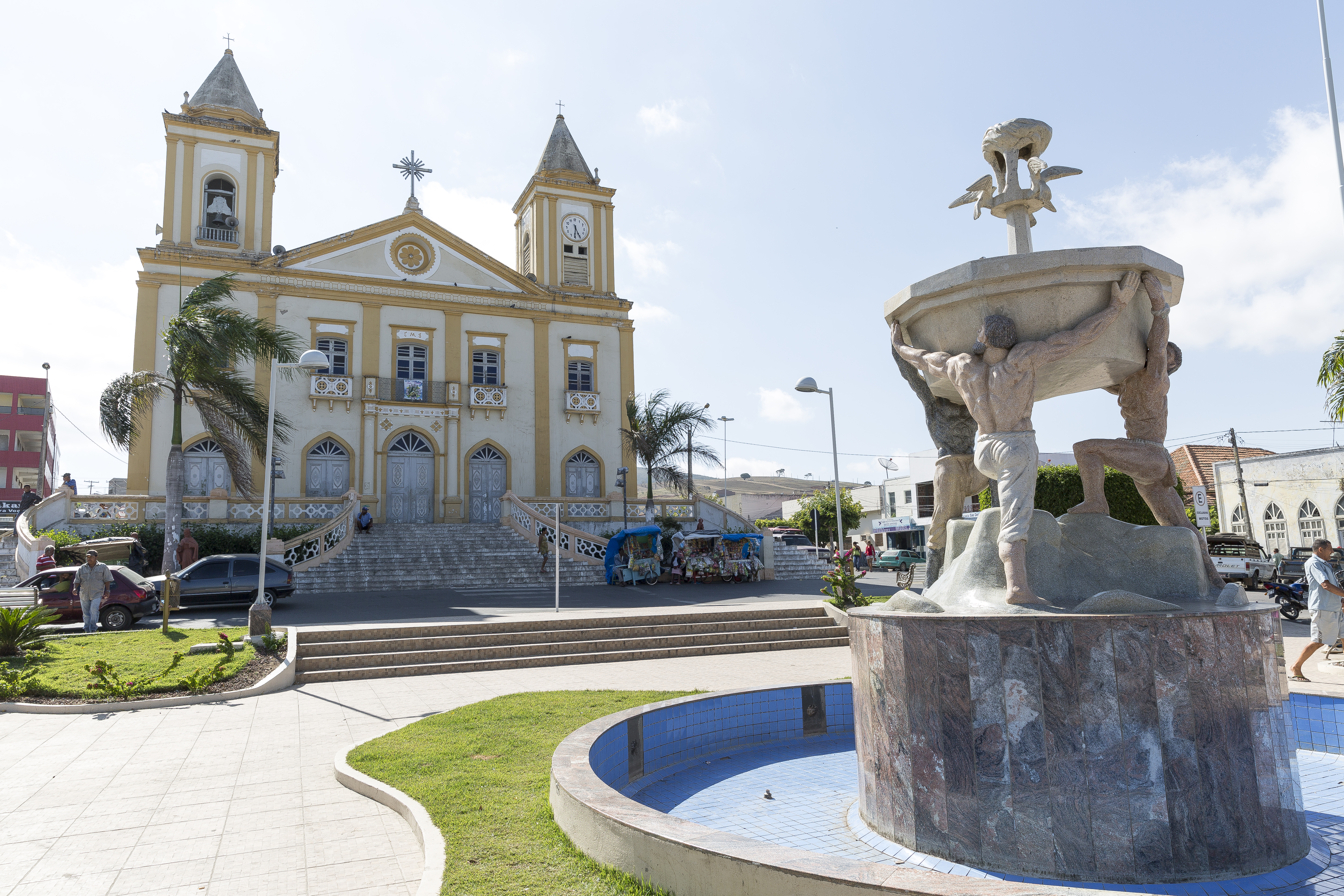
- Central plaza of Bom Conselho with the Parish of Jesus, Mary and Joseph church

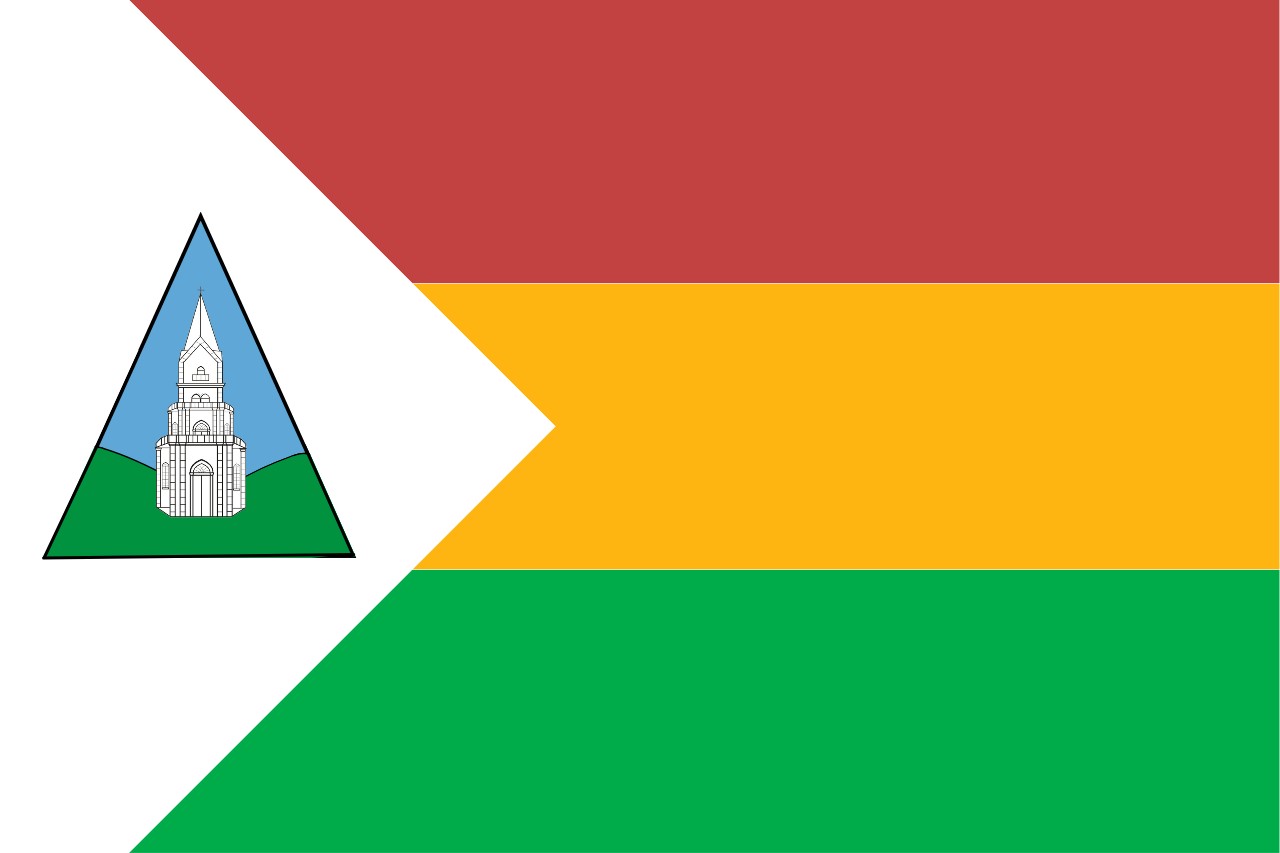
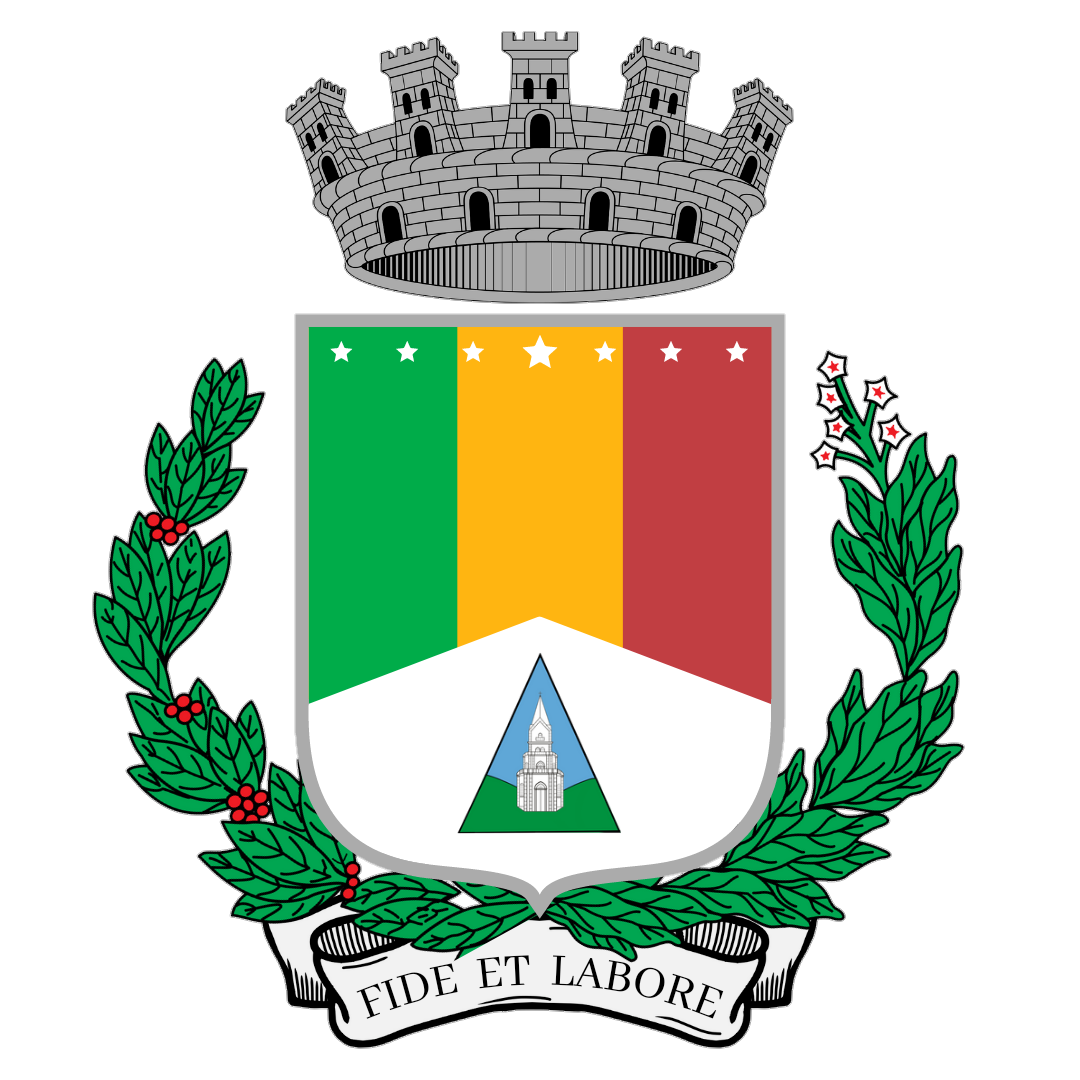
- Flag Coat of arms
- Etymology: Named after the Colégio Nossa Senhora do Bom Conselho (English: Our Lady of Good Counsel School) in the municipality
- Location of Bom Conselho in Pernambuco

- Location within Brazil Location within South America
- Coordinates: 9°10′12″S 36°40′48″W
- Country: Brazil
- Region: Northeast
- State: Pernambuco
- Founded: 6 June 1898

Government
  - Mayor: Edezio Ferreira dos Santos Filho (PV) (2025-2028)
  - Vice Mayor: Cintia Anselmo de Lima Ferreira (PT) (2025-2028)

Area
  - Total: 790.774 km^{2} (305.320 sq mi)
- Elevation: 654 m (2,146 ft)

Population (2022 Census)
  - Total: 44,294
  - Estimate (2025): 46,202
  - Density: 55.91/km^{2} (144.8/sq mi)
- Demonym: Conselhense (Brazilian Portuguese)
- Time zone: UTC-03:00 (Brasília Time)
- Postal code: 55330-000, 55332-000, 55334-000, 55335-000, 55336-000, 55337-000, 55338-000
- HDI (2010): 0.563 – medium
- Website: bomconselho.pe.gov.br

Bom Conselho (Central northeastern portuguese pronunciation: [ˈbõ kõˈseju]) ("Good Advice") is a city in northeastern Brazil, in the state of Pernambuco. It lies in the mesoregion of Agreste of Pernambuco and has 786.2 sq/km of total area.

== Geography ==
- State – Pernambuco
- Region – Agreste of Pernambuco
- Boundaries – Saloá and Terezinha (N); Alagoas state (S); Lagoa do Ouro (E); Iati (W).
- Area – 786.2 km^{2}
- Elevation – 654 m
- Hydrography – Ipanema River
- Vegetation – Caatinga Hipoxerófila
- Annual average temperature – 22.0 c
- Distance to Recife – 266 km
- Population - 44,294 (2022 Census)

== Economy ==
The main economic activities in Bom Conselho are related to commerce and agribusiness, especially the raising of cattle, pigs, sheep, and horses, and plantations of sweet potatoes, beans and bananas.

=== Economic indicators ===
Population	GDP x(1000 R$).	GDP pc (R$)	PE
45.250	150.992	3.479	0.25%

Economy by sector 2006

Primary sector	Secondary sector	Service sector
21.04%	8.62%	70.34%

=== Health indicators ===
HDI (2000)	Hospitals (2007)	Hospitals beds (2007)	Children's mortality every 1000 (2005)
0.572	1	47	30.1

== See also ==
- List of municipalities in Pernambuco
