= Ipanema River =

Coordinates: 9°53′06″S 37°14′41″W

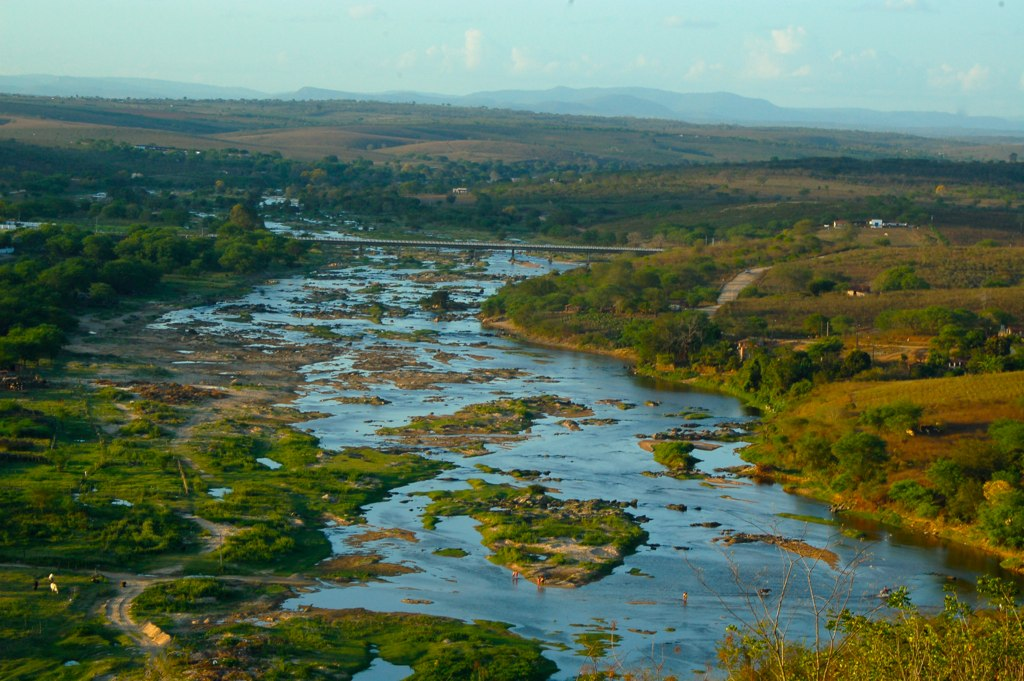

Location
- Country: Brazil

Physical characteristics
- Source
  - location: Pernambuco state
- Mouth
  - location: Alagoas state

Ipanema River is a river of Alagoas and Pernambuco states in eastern Brazil.

== See also ==
- List of rivers of Alagoas
- List of rivers of Pernambuco
