= Agreste =

Geographical zone of Brazil

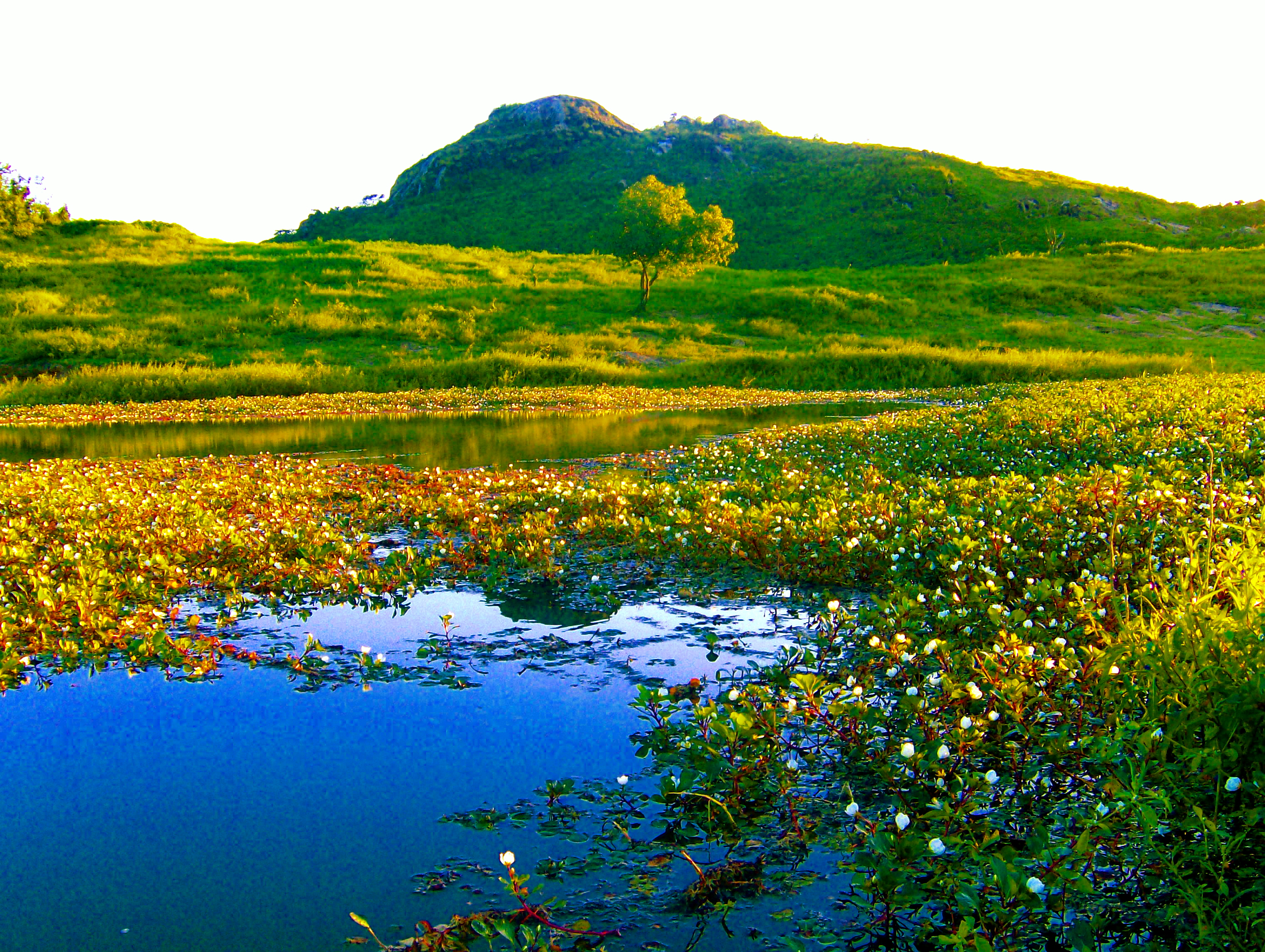
- Pedra do Cordeiro in the Agreste

- The Subregions of Northeast Brazil; 1 • Meio-norte, 2 • Sertão, 3 • Agreste, 4 • Zona da Mata
- Country: Brazil

The agreste (Portuguese pronunciation: [aˈɡɾɛstʃi], "countryside") is a narrow zone of Brazil in the states of Rio Grande do Norte, Paraíba, Pernambuco, Alagoas, Sergipe and Bahia between the coastal forest zona da mata and the semiarid sertão. The agreste fades out after it reaches Rio Grande do Norte due to the break of the mountain chain that blocks air currents from the Atlantic Ocean. This barrier is what induces high rainfall in the coastal Atlantic forest zone.

Most of the agreste is hilly, its hills becoming higher in the south, except near the narrow valley of the São Francisco River. This land is mostly used for mixed farming, especially fruits, of which melons are especially important. Like the sertão, the agreste is frequently affected by drought, though generally with less severe effects. Only some highland regions mostly in Pernambuco, where cities like Garanhuns and Triunfo are located, are able to reach temperatures below 10 degrees Celsius for part of the year, usually during the South American winter.

== Climate ==
The climate is hot and sub-humid, with rainfall in the area's principal city of Campina Grande averaging about 700 millimetres per year; it ranges from less than 10 millimetres in October and November to about 120 millimetres in May and June.

Campina Grande

Climate chart (precipitation, max. and min. temperature)
J	F	M	A	M	J	J	A	S	O	N	D
27 30 20	41 30 20	74 28 20	94 28 20	118 27 18	119 26 18	84 25 18	59 24 18	24 27 18	13 28 19	16 29 20	19 30 20
- █ Average max. and min. temperatures in °C
- █ Precipitation totals in mm
Imperial conversion
J	F	M	A	M	J	J	A	S	O	N	D
1.1 86 68	1.6 86 68	2.9 82 68	3.7 82 68	4.6 81 64	4.7 79 64	3.3 77 64	2.3 75 64	0.9 81 64	0.5 82 66	0.6 84 68	0.7 86 68
- █ Average max. and min. temperatures in °F
- █ Precipitation totals in inches

Guarabira

Climate chart (precipitation, max. and min. temperature)
J	F	M	A	M	J	J	A	S	O	N	D
41 32 22	63 33 22	98 33 22	122 31 21	151 30 21	202 29 20	88 29 19	56 29 19	22 30 20	12 31 21	20 32 22	45 32 22
- █ Average max. and min. temperatures in °C
- █ Precipitation totals in mm
Imperial conversion
J	F	M	A	M	J	J	A	S	O	N	D
1.6 90 72	2.5 91 72	3.9 91 72	4.8 88 70	5.9 86 70	8 84 68	3.5 84 66	2.2 84 66	0.9 86 68	0.5 88 70	0.8 90 72	1.8 90 72
- █ Average max. and min. temperatures in °F
- █ Precipitation totals in inches

== See also ==
- History of Brazil
- Brazilian literature
- Drought
- Brazil Socio-Geographic Division
- Sertão
- Droughts
- Tieta do Agreste, a Brazilian novel and film
- Caatinga
