= Cedro =

Cedro is the name for the cedar tree in some Romance languages. It may refer to:

- Cedro, Ceará, municipality in the state of Ceará, Brazil
- Cedro, Pernambuco, city in the state of Pernambuco, Brazil
- Cedro, Cayey, Puerto Rico, barrio in the municipality of Cayey, Puerto Rico
- Cedro, New Mexico, census-designated place (CDP) in Bernalillo County, New Mexico, United States
