= Belém de São Francisco =

Municipality of Pernambuco, Brazil

- Municipality
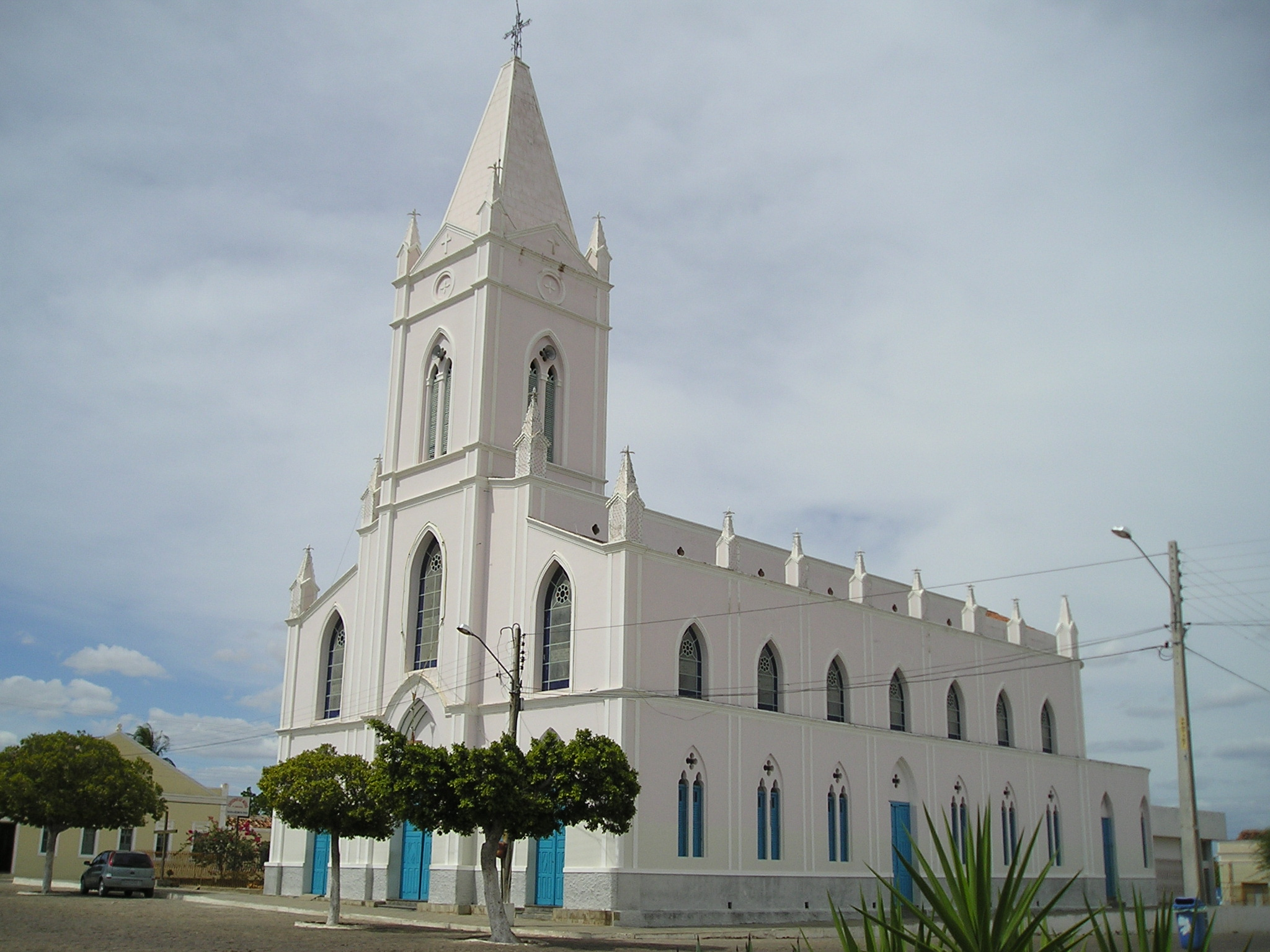
- Parish of Menino Deus church

- Flag Coat of arms

- Location of Belém de São Francisco in Pernambuco

- Location within Brazil Location within South America
- Coordinates: 08°45′28″S 38°57′50″W
- Country: Brazil
- Region: Northeast
- State: Pernambuco
- Founded: 7 May 1903

Government
  - Mayor: Calby De Carvalho Cruz (Republicanos) (2025-2028)
  - Vice Mayor: Roberval De Aguiar Couto (PP) (2025-2028)

Area
  - Total: 1,830.8 km^{2} (706.9 sq mi)
- Elevation: 305 m (1,001 ft)

Population (2022 Census)
  - Total: 18,301
  - Estimate (2025): 18,648
  - Density: 10/km^{2} (26/sq mi)
- Demonym: Belenense (Brazilian Portuguese)
- Time zone: UTC-03:00 (Brasília Time)
- Postal code: 56440-000, 56445-000, 56450-000
- HDI (2010): 0.642 – medium
- Website: belemdosaofrancisco.pe.gov.br

Belém de São Francisco (Central northeastern portuguese pronunciation: [bɛˈlẽj di ˈsɐ̃w fɾɐ̃ˈsiskŭ]; Bethlehem of San Francisco) is a city in the state of Pernambuco, Brazil. The population in 2020, according with IBGE was 18,468 and the area is 1.830,828 km^{2}.

== Geography ==
- State - Pernambuco
- Region - São Francisco Pernambucano
- Boundaries - Salgueiro (N); Bahia state (S); Itacuruba and Carnaubeira da Penha (E); Cabrobó (W)
- Area - 1830.81 km^{2}
- Elevation - 305 m
- Hydrography - Pajeú and Terra Nova rivers
- Vegetation - Caatinga hiperxerófila.
- Climate - Semi arid ( Sertão) hot and dry
- Annual average temperature - 26.2 c
- Distance to Recife - 456 km

== Economy ==
The main economic activities in Belém de São Francisco are based in general commerce and agribusiness, especially farming of goats, sheep, cattle, donkeys and chickens; and plantations of mangoes, onions, and rice.

=== Economic Indicators ===
| Population | GDP x(1000 R$). | GDP pc (R$) | PE |
|---|---|---|---|
| 21.342 | 78.820 | 3.836 | 0.13% |

Economy by Sector 2006

| Primary sector | Secondary sector | Service sector |
|---|---|---|
| 20.04% | 9.43% | 70.54% |

=== Health Indicators ===
| HDI (2000) | Hospitals (2007) | Hospitals beds (2007) | Children's Mortality every 1000 (2005) |
|---|---|---|---|
| 0.669 | 1 | 48 | 22.4 |

== Notable people ==
- Sérgia Ribeiro da Silva (1915-1994), a prominent cangaçeira

== See also ==
- List of municipalities in Pernambuco
