= Sérgia Ribeiro da Silva =

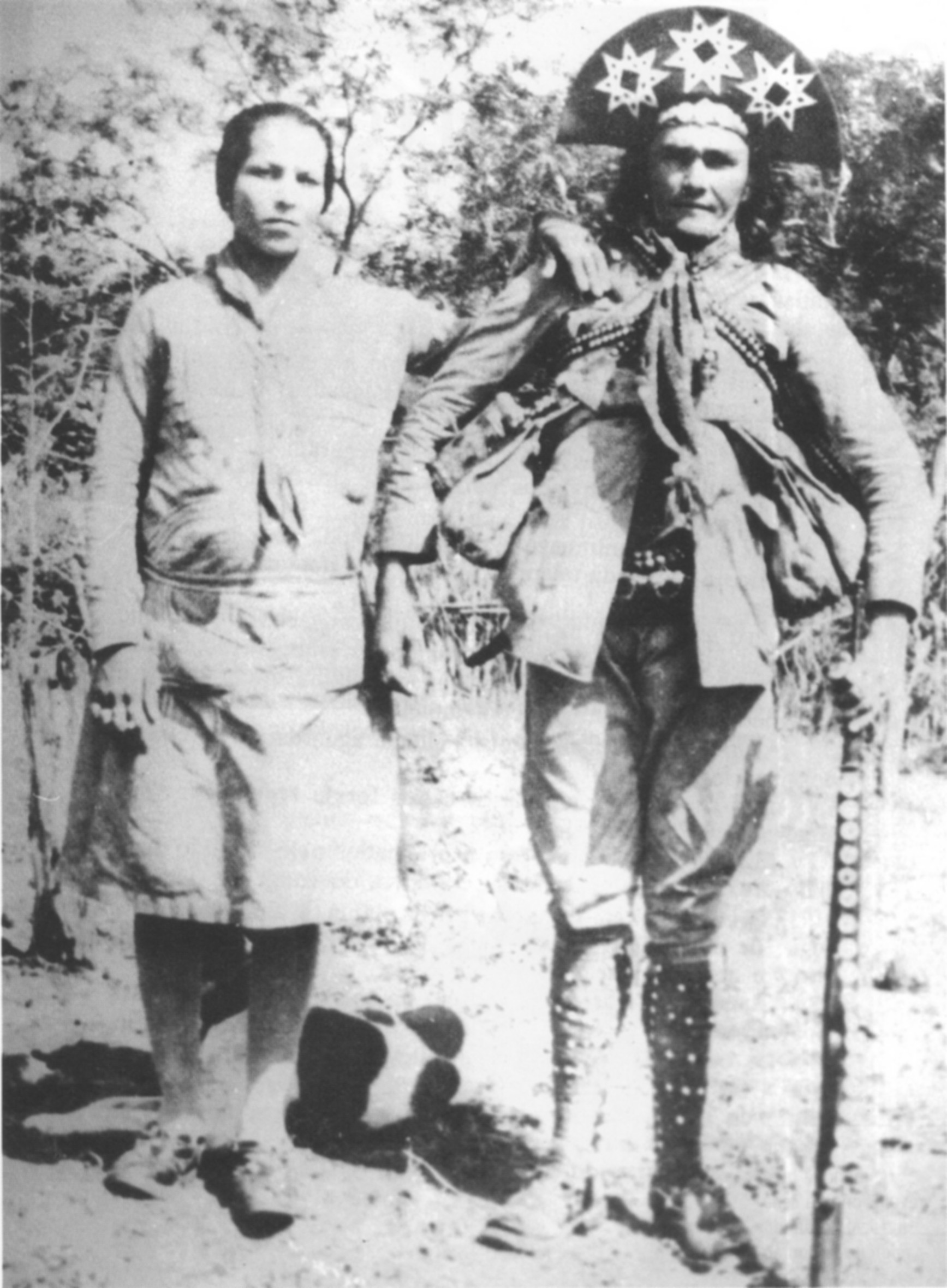
- Dadá and Corisco
- Born: April 25, 1915; Belém de São Francisco, Pernambuco, Brazil
- Died: February 1994 (aged 78); Salvador, Bahia, Brazil

Sérgia Ribeiro da Silva, better known as Dadá (April 25, 1915, Belém de São Francisco - Salvador, February 1994) was a prominent cangaçeira — a woman bandit who took up arms on the side of Lampião. There were two films made regarding Ribeiro, Corisco & Dadá and A Mulher no Cangaço (1976).

Dadá went on to live in Salvador, fighting to see the legislation that assures respect to the dead fulfilled - and the tetric exhibition of the Anthropological Museum Estácio de Lima, located in the building of the Legal Medical Institute Nina Rodrigues put an end. It was only on February 6, 1969, under the Luiz Viana Filho administration, that the remains of the cangaceiros could be definitively inhumed - the museum having made molds to exhibit them instead. Dadá's older brother, Manoel, died on 15 November 2025 at the claimed age of 116. He claimed to have been born on March 19, 1909.
