= São José do Belmonte =

Municipality in Pernambuco state, Brazil

- Municipality of Pernambuco, Brazil
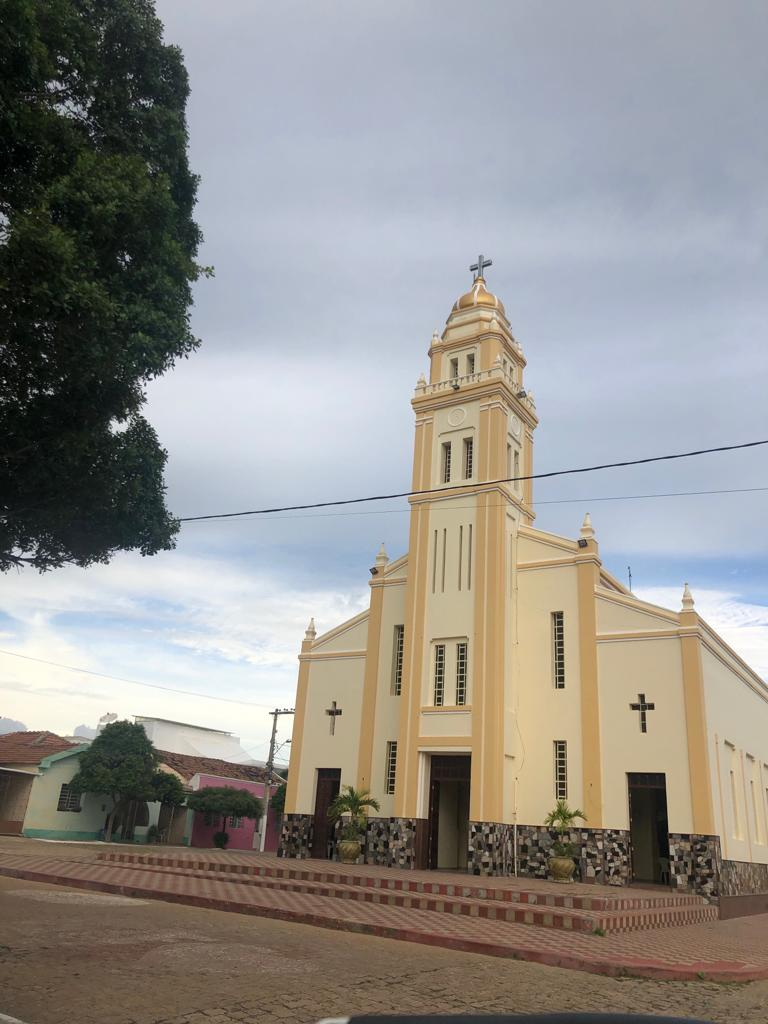
- São José parish church in São José do Belmonte

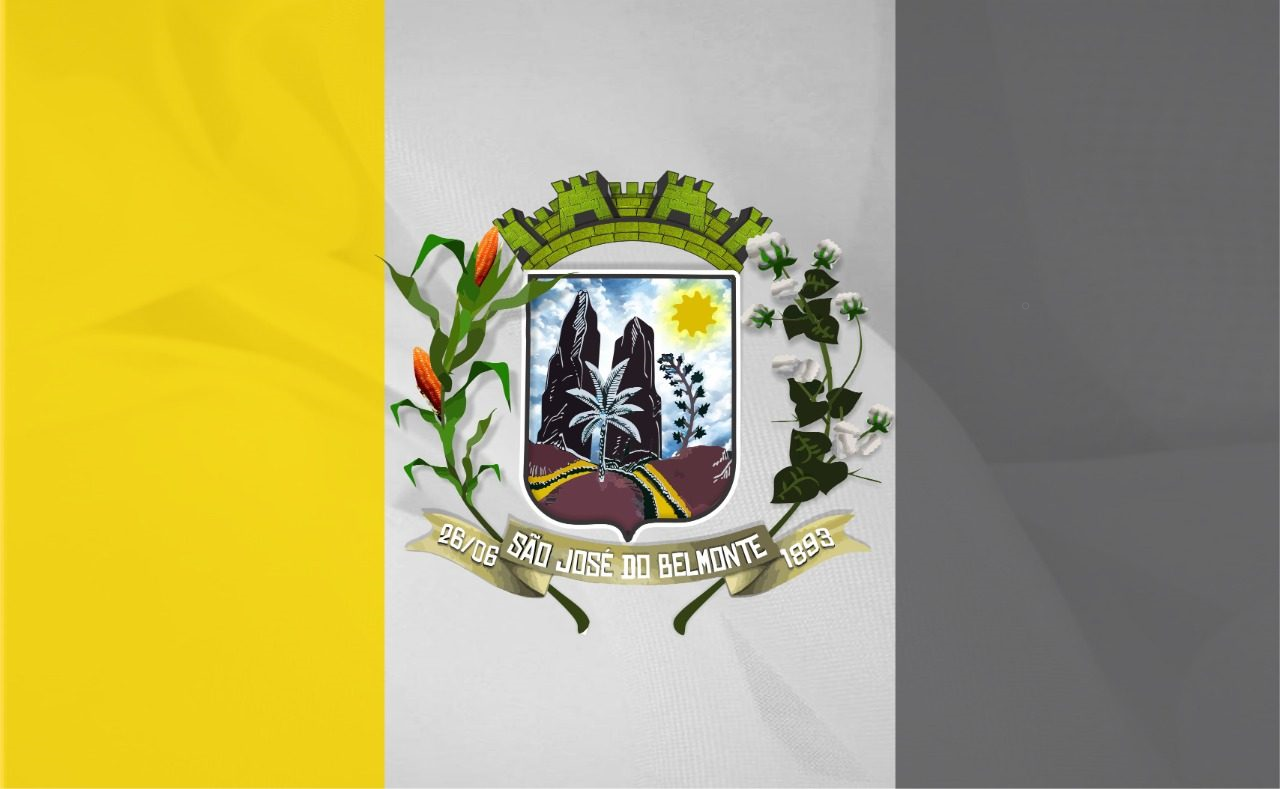
- Flag

- Location of São José do Belmonte in Pernambuco

- Location within Brazil Location within South America
- Coordinates: 7°51′39″S 38°45′36″W
- Country: Brazil
- Region: Northeast
- State: Pernambuco
- Founded: 2 October 1890

Government
  - Mayor: Vinicius Marques Alves (PSB) (2025-2028)
  - Vice Mayor: Erik Cesar Sarmento Diniz (Republicanos) (2025-2028)

Area
  - Total: 1,474.086 km^{2} (569.148 sq mi)
- Elevation: 486 m (1,594 ft)

Population (2022 Census)
  - Total: 34,843
  - Estimate (2025): 36,890
  - Density: 23.64/km^{2} (61.2/sq mi)
- Demonym: Belmontense (Brazilian Portuguese)
- Time zone: UTC-03:00 (Brasília Time)
- Postal code: 56950-000, 56970-000
- HDI (2010): 0.610 – medium
- Website: saojosedobelmonte.pe.gov.br

São José do Belmonte (Central northeastern portuguese pronunciation: [ˈsɐ̃w ʒuˈzɛ dŭ bɛwˈmõti]) is a city and municipality in the state of Pernambuco, Brazil. The population in 2025, according with IBGE was 36,890 inhabitants and the total area is 1474.086 km².

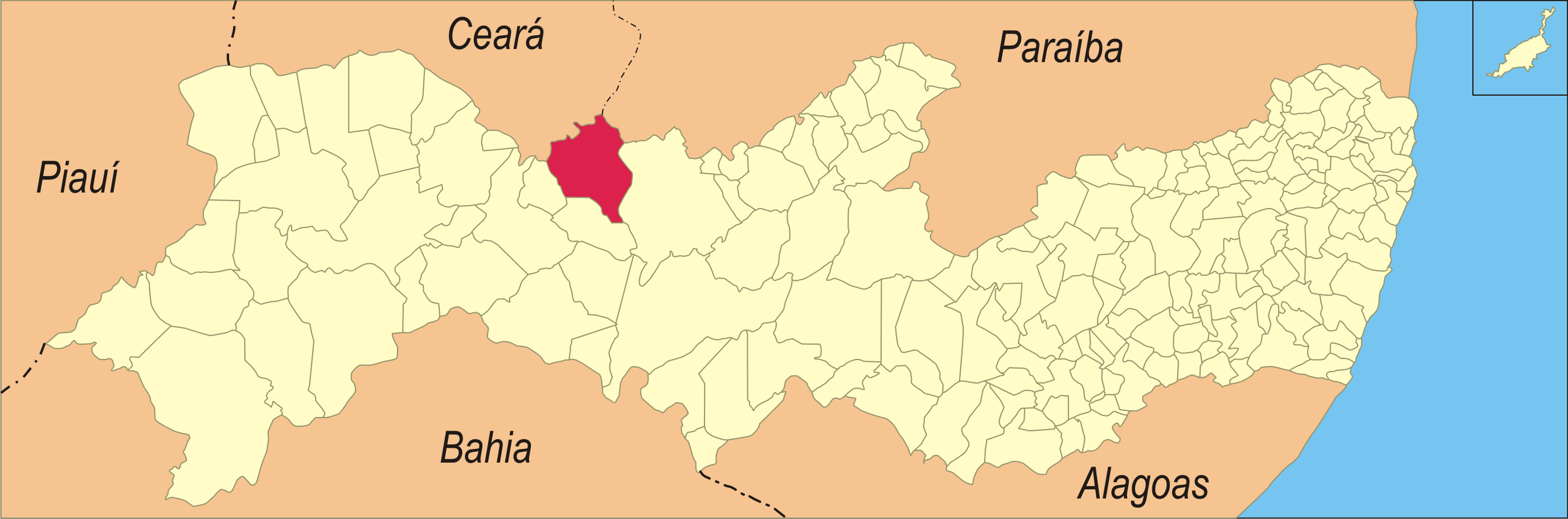
Location of São José do Belmonte in Pernambuco

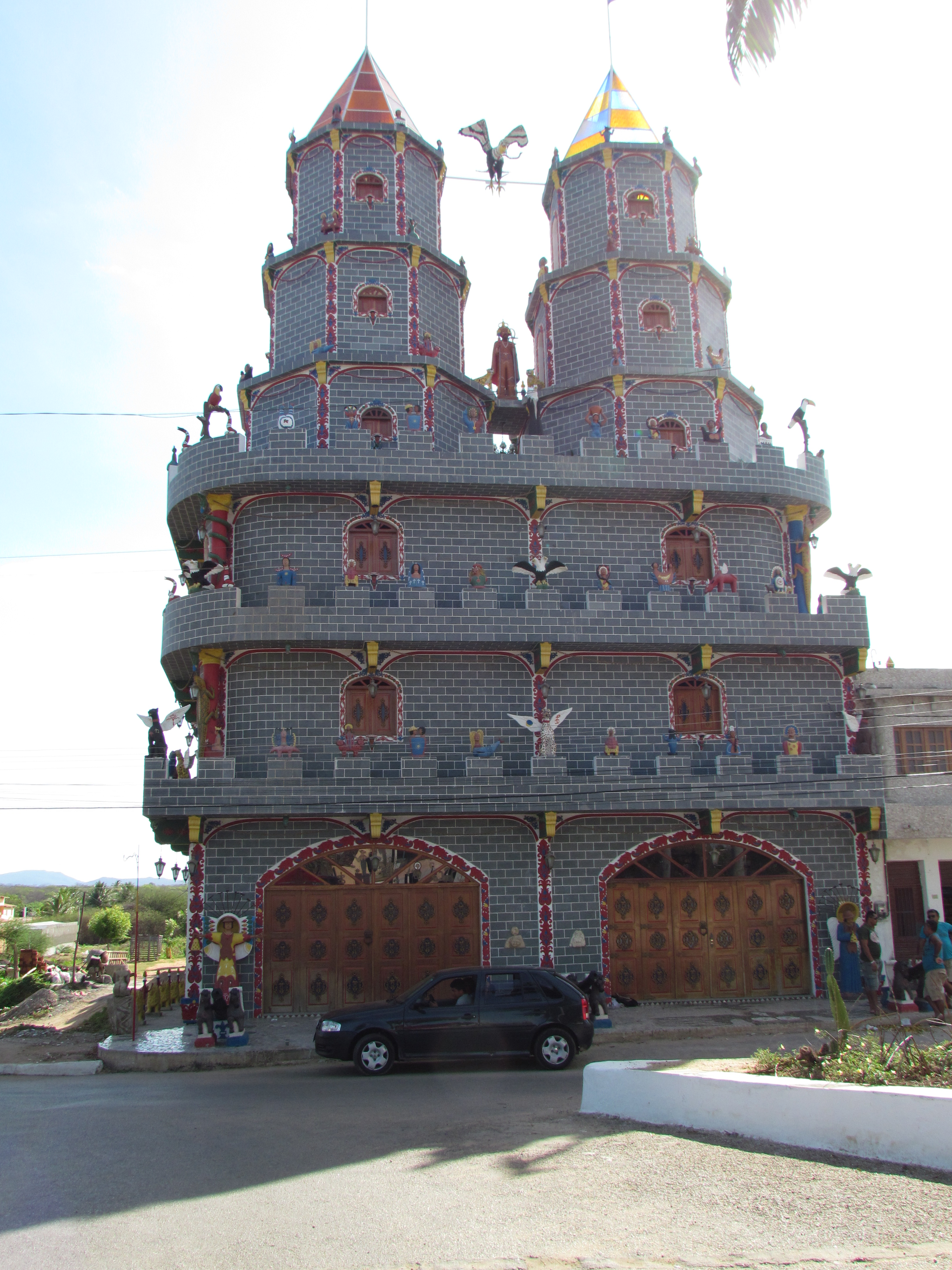
Castelo Armorial Reino Encantado in São José do Belmonte

== Geography ==
- State - Pernambuco
- Region - Sertão Pernambucano
- Boundaries - Paraiba and Ceará states (N); Mirandiba (S); Serra Talhada (E); Verdejante (W)
- Area - 1479.96 km²
- Elevation - 486 m
- Hydrography - Pajeú River
- Vegetation - Caatinga hiperxerófila
- Climate - semi arid - (Sertão)
- Annual average temperature - 25.4 c
- Distance to Recife - 470 km

The municipality is currently divided into two districts (as of 1988), São José do Belmonte, and Bom Nome.

== Economy ==
The main economic activities in São José do Belmonte are based on industry, commerce and agribusiness, especially farming of goats, cattle, sheep, pigs, horses, chickens; and plantations of manioc, beans and tomatoes.

=== Economic Indicators ===
Population	GDP x(1000 R$).	GDP pc (R$)	PE
34.118	97.342	2.976	0.17%

Economy by Sector 2006

Primary sector	Secondary sector	Service sector
15.19%	15.76%	69.05%

=== Health Indicators ===
HDI (2000)	Hospitals (2007)	Hospitals beds (2007)	Children's Mortality every 1000 (2005)
0.635	2	76	19.9

== See also ==
- List of municipalities in Pernambuco
