= Mirandiba =

Municipality of Pernambuco, Brazil

- Municipality of Pernambuco, Brazil
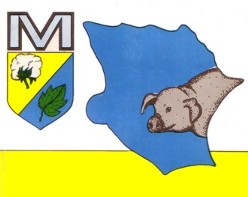
- Flag Coat of arms
- Etymology: Derived from the indigenous language, meaning "white-lipped peccary"
- Location of Mirandiba in Pernambuco

- Location within Brazil Location within South America
- Coordinates: 8°7′17″S 38°43′42″W
- Country: Brazil
- Region: Northeast
- State: Pernambuco
- Founded: 20 October 1958

Government
  - Mayor: Evaldo Bezerra de Carvalho (PSB) (2025-2028)
  - Vice Mayor: Gilberto Gomes de Sá (UNIÃO) (2025-2028)

Area
  - Total: 821.676 km^{2} (317.251 sq mi)
- Elevation: 450 m (1,480 ft)

Population (2022 Census)
  - Total: 14,166
  - Estimate (2025): 14,605
  - Density: 17.24/km^{2} (44.7/sq mi)
- Demonym: Mirandibense (Brazilian Portuguese)
- Time zone: UTC-03:00 (Brasília Time)
- Postal code: 56980-000, 56990-000
- HDI (2010): 0.591 – medium
- Website: mirandiba.pe.gov.br

Mirandiba (Central northeastern portuguese pronunciation: [miɾɐ̃ˈdibɐ]) is a city in the state of Pernambuco, Brazil. The population in 2025, according with IBGE was 14,605 inhabitants and the total area is 821.676 km^{2}.

== Geography ==
The municipality was designated a priority area for conservation and sustainable use when the Caatinga Ecological Corridor was created in 2006.

- State - Pernambuco
- Region - Sertão Pernambucano
- Boundaries - São José do Belmonte (N); Carnaubeira da Penha (S); Serra Talhada (E); Salgueiro and Verdejante (W).
- Area - 809.26 km^{2}
- Elevation - 450 m
- Hydrography - Pajeú River
- Vegetation - Caatinga hiperxerófila
- Climate - semi arid - (Sertão) hot
- Annual average temperature - 25.2 c
- Distance to Recife - 470 km

== Economy ==
The main economic activities in Mirandiba are based in commerce and agribusiness, especially creation of goats, sheep, pigss, cattle, chickens; and plantations of tomatoes and beans.

=== Economic Indicators ===
Population	GDP x(1000 R$).	GDP pc (R$)	PE
13.810	43.457	3.266	0.075%

Economy by Sector (2006)

Primary sector	Secondary sector	Service sector
18.60%	8.42%	72.98%

=== Health Indicators ===
HDI (2000)	Hospitals (2007)	Hospitals beds (2007)	Children's Mortality every 1000 (2005)
0.636	1	34	18.7

== See also ==
- List of municipalities in Pernambuco
