= Uamué language =

Extinct language of Brazil

Uamué
- Aticum, Umã
- Native to: Brazil
- Region: Floresta, Pernambuco
- Ethnicity: Atikum people
- Extinct: after 1961
- Language family: unclassified (Kariri?)

Language codes
- ISO 639-3: uam
- Glottolog: uamu1236
- Linguasphere: 89-AAA-aa
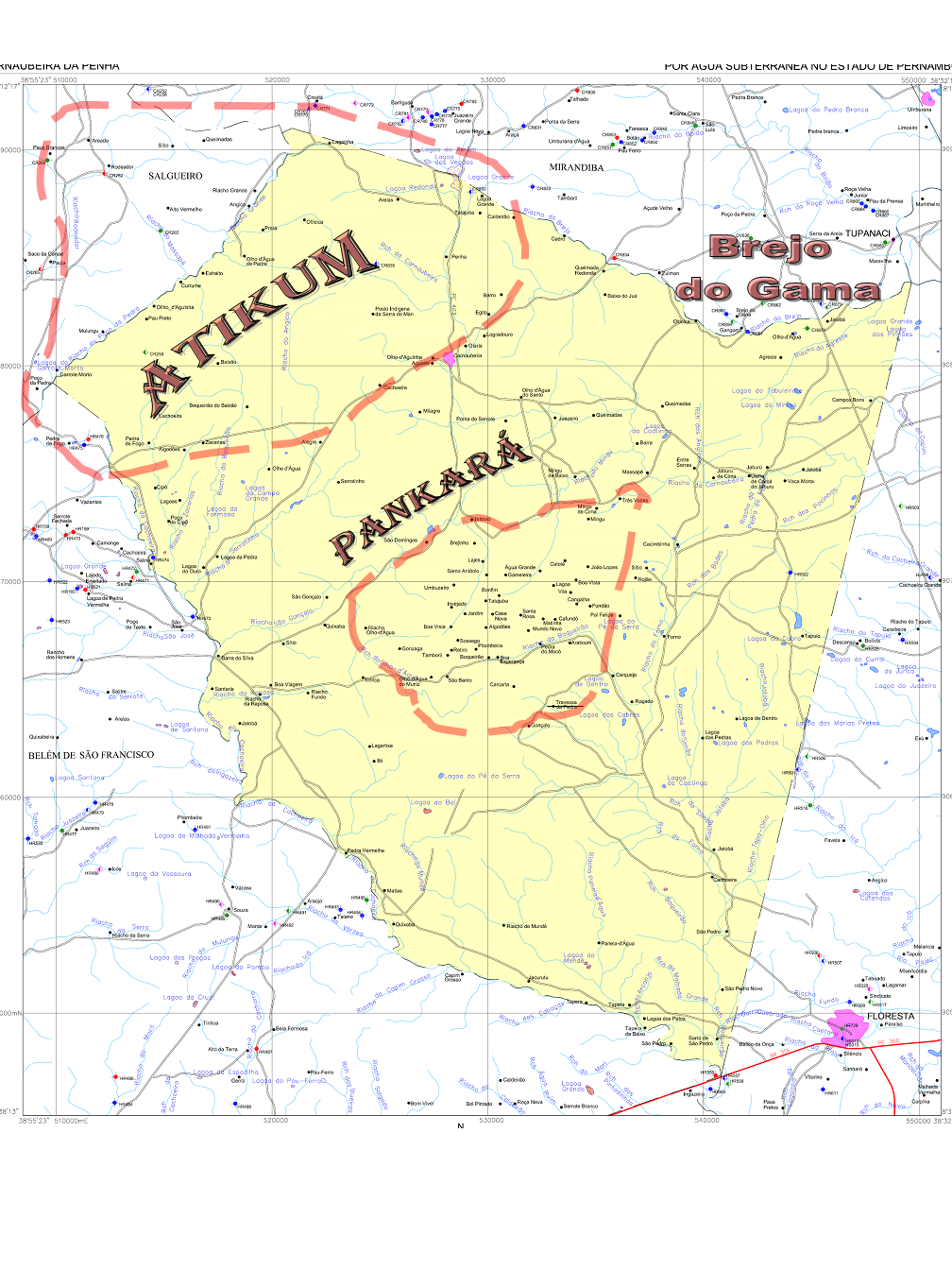
- Map of Atikum territory in Carnaubeira da Penha, eastern Brazil

Uamué (Wamoe), a.k.a. Huamoé, Uman, or Atikum, is an extinct language of Brazil that is too poorly attested to classify. The Pankararú language was historically spoken just to the south. It is also spelled Huamuê, Huamoi, Uame, Wamoé. Alternate names are Umã and Aticum (Atikum, Araticum). There has been speculation that Huamoé was a Kariri language. Today, the Atikum only preserve some of their language in the context of nature (e. g. toê 'fire' and sarapó 'large edible snake') and have entirely switched to Portuguese.

== Vocabulary ==
=== Meader (1978) ===
In 1961, three Aticum word lists were recorded by Menno Kroeker from three informants in Pernambuco State, and are published in Meader (1978). The lists are reproduced below, with English translations also given. However, the wordlists are inconsistent between informants and contain a number of modified Portuguese words. Kroeker thus speculated that the informants intentionally gave him incorrect forms.

Word list recorded from Antônio Masio de Souza, a farmer from Carnaúba, Pernambuco:

| Portuguese gloss (original) | English gloss (translated) | Aticum |
|---|---|---|
| fogo | fire | àtòˈé |
| pequena lagoa | small pond | kàtìšὶdὶnὶ |
| mãe | mother | sih / æ̀ntὶsὶdὶnˈómà |
| pai | father | æ̀ntὶsὶdὶnˈómù |
| banana | banana | pàkˈóà |
| batata | potato | zítírə̃̀nˈí |
| cavalo | horse | kə̃̀naùrùˈí |
| deus | God | tùpˈə̃̀ |
| ladrão | thief | lˈáklì də̃̀nkùrˈí |
| negro do cabelo duro | hard black hair | màkˈétò pìàkˈá |
| sem-vergonha | shameless | sˈέklì vlˈέklì kə̃̀nkùrˈí |

Word list recorded from Pedro José Tiatoni, a wandering pajé (shaman) from Jatobá, Pernambuco (near Maniçobal):

| Portuguese gloss (original) | English gloss (translated) | Aticum |
|---|---|---|
| amigo | friend | méˈὲlì |
| bolha d'água | water bubble | boiI dˈægwai |
| casar-se | marry | kã̀zˈuUtĩ |
| cego | blind | sὲdˈíntú |
| cérebro | brain | ὲsὲloˈú bàiὲ |
| chefe | chief | šeEfˈuUte |
| cicatriz | scar | sìkˈéιtæ̀ù |
| corcovado | humped | kɔ́Ɔkɔ̀rˈítìvá |
| corpo | body | èžóːO kóOpítˈĩ̀ |
| cotovelo | elbow | šὲkítˈũ̀và |
| dedo | finger | dὲényˈò |
| doente | sick | déˈósìtə̃́ |
| doer | to hurt, be in pain | dòέkátˈũ̀ |
| garganta | throat | gàrgὲlˈí |
| gêmeos | twins | zéὲˈéEtìò |
| inimigo | enemy | ínˈίƖsì |
| médico | doctor | météòhˈὲtù |
| muco | mucus | bὲtˈṍkyà |
| nuca | nape | sṹkˈè kɔ̀tì |
| ombro | shoulder | álíˈɔ́kà |
| patrão | master, boss | péEtɔi |
| pulso | pulse | sὲóːspˈóːpə̀ |
| punho | fist | pὲóOtˈə̃̀ |
| pus | pus | pe |
| queixo | chin | séikítˈὲ šĩ̀ |
| remédio | medicine | rèmèzˈítíò |
| rosto | face | làbàtˈíš tὲˈíštú |
| surdo | deaf | sùUtˈέlì |
| testa | forehead | tˈúmàžĩ́nὲtà |
| tossir | cough | tˈóːmɔ̀štìà |
| tumor | tumor | túmˈàžù |
| varíola | smallpox | vȁréʔˈὲlì |
| veia | vein | vέlˈùUsí |
| verruga | wart | gˈaAgoleE |

Word list recorded from Luís Baldo, a wandering pajé (shaman) from near Cachoeirinha, Pernambuco:

| Portuguese gloss (original) | English gloss (translated) | Aticum |
|---|---|---|
| água | water | žεntˈura |
| árvore (genérico) | tree (generic) | selˈa |
| árvore (musame) | tree (musame) | žˈatoe |
| árvore (um tipo) | tree (type of) | aparεšiˈũ |
| cabeça | head | nˈuvi |
| casa | house | zə̃ŋgˈada, ohə̃šˈaria |
| cobra | snake | sarapˈɔ |
| fogo | fire | ˈošu |
| fumo | smoke | pakˈaso |
| furar / buraco | to drill / hole | žudˈaku |
| lavar-se | wash oneself | žodˈaxsi |
| limpo | clean | žˈinto |
| mão | hand | žə̃nˈu |
| nuvem | cloud | žˈúnúpà |
| orelha | ear | ukˈə̃ |
| panela | pan | sə̃nˈεla |
| peixe | fish | useštiãˈõ |
| (piolho) | (louse) | žirˈuda |
| rir | laugh | xˈika |
| sol | sun | patupˈə̃ |
| o sol está quente | The sun is hot. | o so ʌta kˈə̃ta |
| acender | light up | æžudˈea |
| acordar-se | wake up | axšodˈaːši |
| algodão | cotton | kapušˈu |
| alegre | happy | gˈεgi |
| aldeia | village | žˈə̃ndũ |
| amargo | bitter | ažˈaxku |
| apagar | turn off | ašotˈa |
| arbusto | bush | žˈota |
| azedo | sour | aAsˈedu |
| balde | bucket | εlˈagi |
| banana | banana | ə̃nə̃nˈa |
| barranco | ravine | sahˈə̃ŋku |
| batata | potato | šˈə̃milya |
| bode | goat | tˈoda |
| bolsa | bag | zˈoOsa |
| brando | mild | žˈandu |
| cachaça | cachaça | kə̃mbˈumba |
| cachorro | dog | tašˈoku |
| cadeira | chair | sadeˈira |
| caixa | box | šekˈə̃ |
| cama | bed | sˈəma |
| cansado | tired | sˈadu |
| carriça | wren | sumˈiga |
| cego | blind | sˈεsa |
| cerca | fence | sˈeːkə |
| cesta | basket | εsestaˈũgũ |
| chorar | cry | šˈuga |
| cobertor | blanket | zˈidyo |
| colher | spoon | æžilˈεka, šulˈεka |
| cova | grave | šˈɔda |
| cru | crude | tu |
| cuia | cuia | εšˈuia |
| dedo | finger | dˈedo |
| doce | sweet | dˈota |
| doente | sick | žinˈεti |
| duro | hard | ažˈuru, sˈasu |
| encanamento | plumbing | žedˈə̃ |
| engolir | swallow | gˈui |
| escada | ladder | žikˈada |
| espinho | thorn | žõŋgaˈiža |
| esteira | mat | bešteˈira |
| estrangeiro | stranger, foreigner | žˈĩžeiro |
| feijão | bean | seižˈãõ |
| fósforo | match (lighter) | sˈɔˑstu |
| gato | cat | tˈata |
| gêmeos | twins | žεni |
| gritar | shout | ˈita |
| ilha | island | ˈida |
| os índios | Indians | nus dí žˈíŋgàʔ šú |
| Jânio Quadros | Jânio Quadros | uz ˈondios |
| Japão | Japan | o zˈiru cə̃ntalˈεros |
| jarro | jug | lˈažo |
| lã | there | osˈõndia |
| lagarto preto | black lizard | žakobˈebo |
| lama | mud | cˈə̃ntara |
| ligeiro | light | varˈeru |
| linha | line | diŋaz |
| mal | bad | zau |
| médico | doctor | žˈedigu |
| mesa | table | zˈeza |
| morcego | bat | sosˈegu |
| onça | jaguar | dˈõnsa |
| parede | wall | degˈedi |
| peneira | sieve | seneˈira |
| penha | cliff | šˈẽñã |
| ponte | bridge | tˈeasiŋ, sˈõnti, gražˈuris |
| prato | plate | šˈatu |
| primeiro | first | temˈedo |
| pulso | pulse | žˈεdigo |
| punho | fist | tˈuŋa |
| querer | want | seˑrˈea |
| rede | net | ˈedõ |
| remédio | medicine | žegˈεdu |
| sabão | soap | šodˈãõ |
| sibilar | hiss | klˈika |
| suar | to sweat | ašugˈaxša |
| tatu | armadillo | takˈu |
| tear | loom | žˈeda |
| tecido | fabric | osˈedãõ |
| terremoto | earthquake | gə̃mˈɔta |
| testa | forehead | tˈεεka |
| teto | ceiling | ketˈu |
| tossir | to cough | sˈɔta |
| triste | sad | kˈesti |
| tronco | trunk | sidˈə̃ |
| último | last, final | žˈitimu |
| urso | bear (animal) | ˈuta |
| urubu | vulture | ukəŋgˈu |
| varíola | smallpox | zˈεriola |
| vassoura | broom | barsoˈura |
| vazio | empty | žˈažiu |
| vela | candle | drˈεzba |
| verruga | wart | šə̃šugˈati |
| viga | beam | dˈigũ |
