= Salgueiro =

Municipality of Pernambuco, Brazil

- Municipality
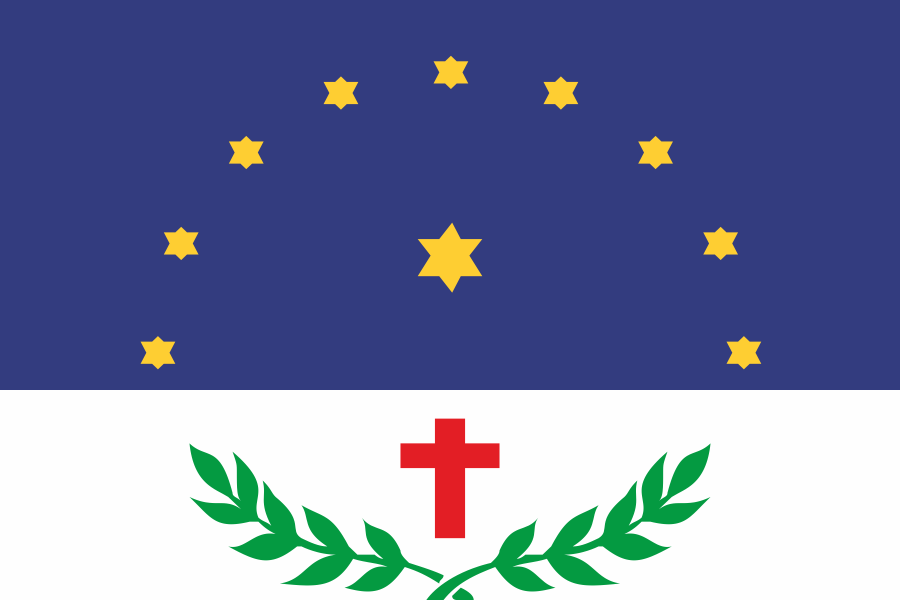
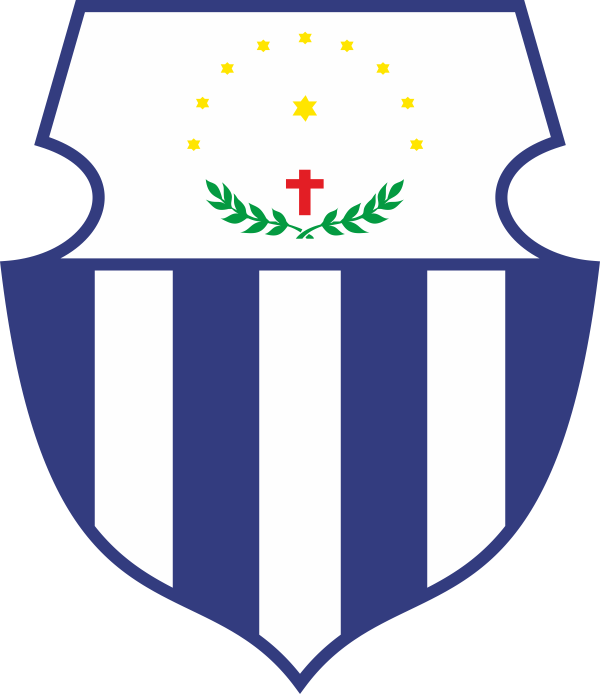
- Flag Coat of arms

- Location in Brazil
- Coordinates: 8°4′27″S 39°7′9″W
- Country: Brazil
- Region: Northeast
- State: Pernambuco

Area
  - Total: 1,687 km^{2} (651 sq mi)

Population (2022 Census)
  - Total: 62,372
  - Estimate (2025): 65,946
  - Density: 36.97/km^{2} (95.76/sq mi)
- Time zone: UTC−3 (BRT)

Salgueiro (Central northeastern portuguese pronunciation: [sɐwˈɡeɾŭ]) is a city in Pernambuco, Brazil. It is located in the mesoregion of Sertão Pernambucano. Salgueiro covers an area of 1678 km² and had in 2025 an estimated population of 65,946 inhabitants.

It is the see city of the Roman Catholic Diocese of Salgueiro, a suffragan see of the Roman Catholic Archdiocese of Olinda e Recife.

== Geography ==
- State - Pernambuco
- Region - Sertão Pernambucano
- Boundaries - Ceará (N); Belém de São Francisco (S), Verdejante, Mirandiba and Carnaubeira da Penha (E); Cabrobó, Terra Nova, Serrita and Cedro (W)
- Area - 1639.3 km^{2}
- Elevation - 420 m
- Hydrography - Terra Nova River
- Vegetation - Forest Subcaducifólia.
- Climate - Semi desertic, ( Sertão) - hot and dry
- Main road - BR 232
- Distance to Recife - 510 km

== Economy ==
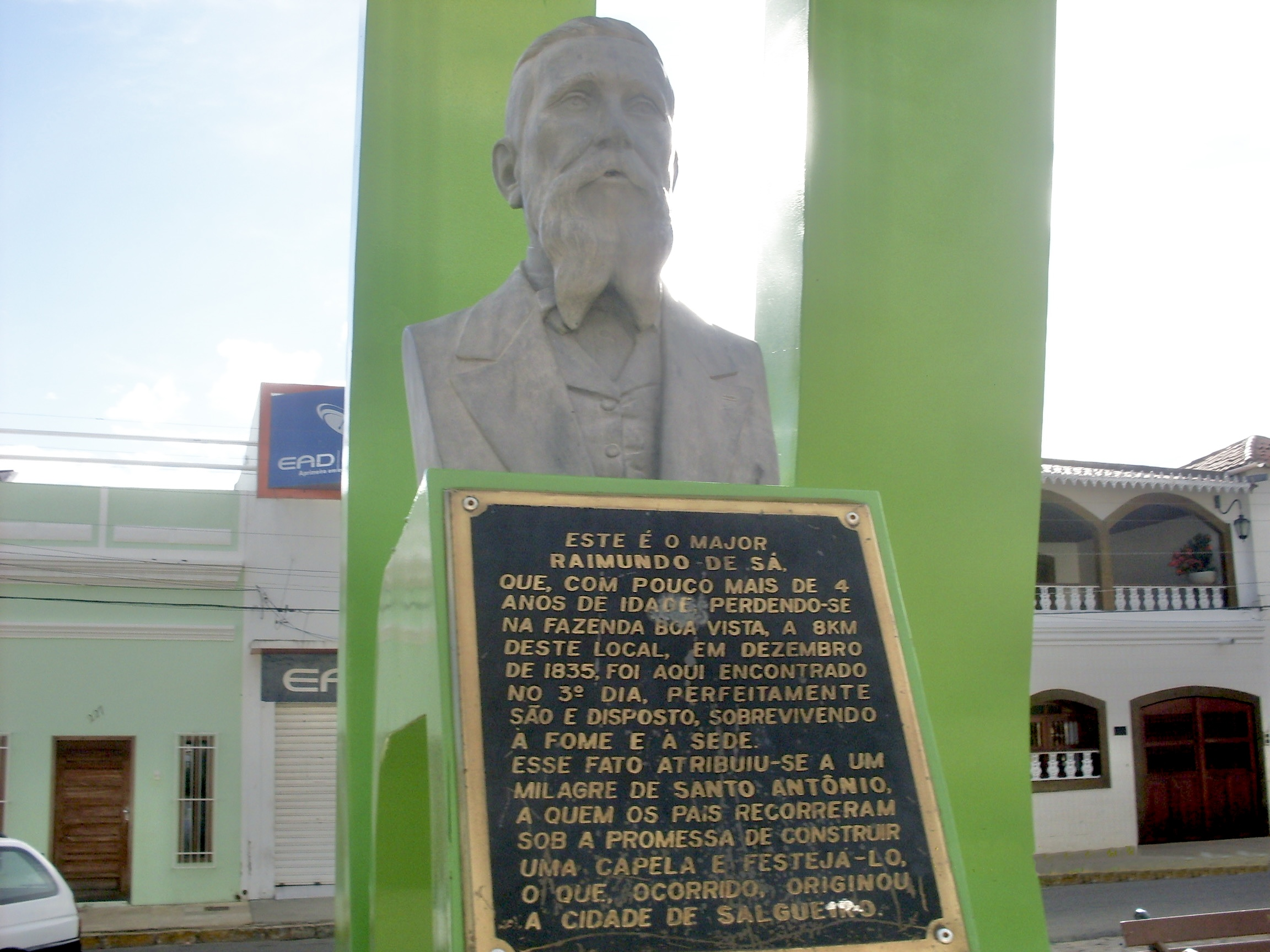
Major Raimundo de Sá Bust-statue

The main economic activities in Salgueiro is based on general commerce and agribusiness, especially plantations of onions, cotton and tomatoes; and creations of cattle, goats, sheep and pigs.

=== Economic Indicators ===
Population	GDP x(1000 R$).	GDP pc (R$)	PE
55.435	236.166	4.442	0.39%

Economy by Sector 2006

Primary sector	Secondary sector	Service sector
3.54%	14.55%	81.91%

=== Health Indicators ===
HDI (2000)	Hospitals (2007)	Hospitals beds (2007)	Children's Mortality every 1000 (2005)
0.708	3	301	24.4

== See also ==
- List of municipalities in Pernambuco
