= Atikum =

Indigenous people of Brazil

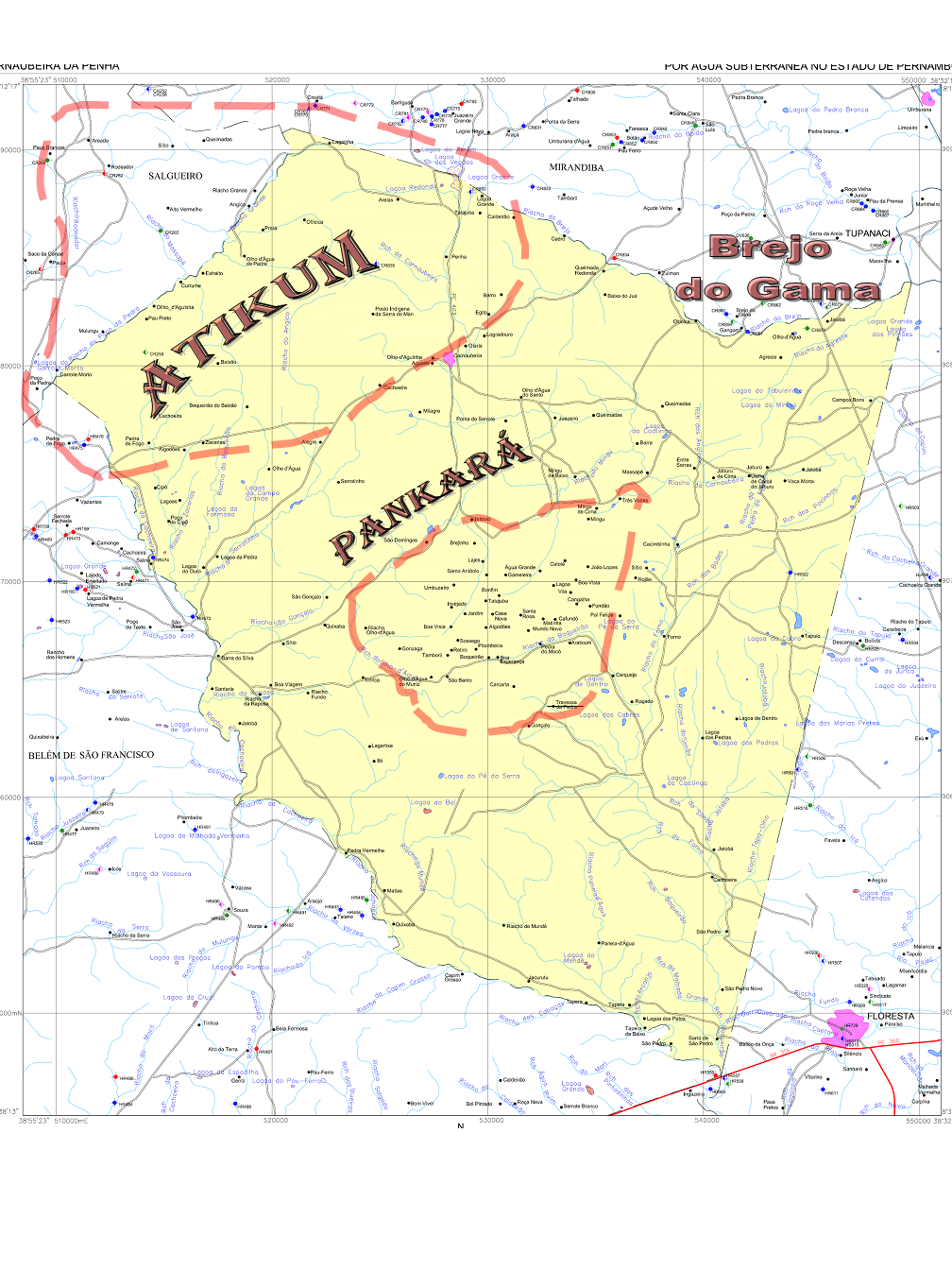
- Map of Atikum territory in Carnaubeira da Penha, eastern Brazil

Total population
- 7,929 (2012)

Regions with significant populations
- Brazil (Bahia, Pernambuco)

Languages
- Portuguese, historically Atikum

Religion
- Traditional tribal religion

The Atikum, also known as Huamuê or Uamué, are an Indigenous people of Brazil that live in Bahia and Pernambuco.

== Territory ==
They have 20 villages within the Atikum Indigenous Land, and their territory is near Carnaubeira da Penha.

== History ==
Known as the "caboclos of the Serra do Umã," the Atikum sought federal recognition from the Brazilian government beginning in the 1940s.

== Language ==
Today Atikum people speak Portuguese. Formerly they spoke the Atikum language, a linguistic isolate.
