= Verdejante =

Municipality of Pernambuco, Brazil

- Municipality of Pernambuco, Brazil
- Flag

- Location of Verdejante in Pernambuco

- Location within Brazil Location within South America
- Coordinates: 7°55′33″S 38°58′19″W
- Country: Brazil
- Region: Northeast
- State: Pernambuco
- Founded: 25 March 1962

Government
  - Mayor: Francisco de Assis Tavares Filho (PSDB) (2025-2028)
  - Vice Mayor: Rosivaldo Bezerra da Silva (PT) (2025-2028)

Area
  - Total: 476.039 km^{2} (183.800 sq mi)
- Elevation: 494 m (1,621 ft)

Population (2022 Census)
  - Total: 9,169
  - Estimate (2025): 9,483
  - Density: 19.26/km^{2} (49.9/sq mi)
- Demonym: Verdejantense (Brazilian Portuguese)
- Time zone: UTC-03:00 (Brasília Time)
- Postal code: 56120-000, 56125-000
- HDI (2010): 0.605 – medium
- Website: verdejante.pe.gov.br

Verdejante (Central northeastern portuguese pronunciation: [veɦdeˈʒɐ̃ti]) is a city in the state of Pernambuco, Brazil. The population in 2025, according to IBGE was 9,483 inhabitants and the total area is 476.04 km^{2}.

== Geography ==
- State - Pernambuco
- Region - Sertão Pernambucano
- Boundaries - Ceará state (N); Salgueiro (S and W); São José do Belmonte and Mirandiba (E).
- Area - 476.03 km^{2}
- Elevation - 494 m
- Vegetation - Caatinga hiperxerófila
- Clima - semi arid - (Sertão)
- Annual average temperature - 24.8 c
- Distance to Recife - 500 km

== Economy ==
The main economic activities in Verdejante are based in agribusiness, especially creation of goats, sheep, pigss, cattle, chickens; and plantations of onions and beans.

=== Economic Indicators ===
Population	GDP x(1000 R$).	GDP pc (R$)	PE
10.098	25.162	2.630	0.04%

Economy by Sector 2006

Primary sector	Secondary sector	Service sector
13.29%	8.93%	77.78%

=== Health Indicators ===
HDI (2000)	Hospitals (2007)	Hospitals beds (2007)	Children's Mortality every 1000 (2005)
0.650	1	17	12.8

== See also ==
- List of municipalities in Pernambuco
