= Carnaubeira da Penha =

City in Pernambuco, Brazil

- Municipality of Pernambuco, Brazil
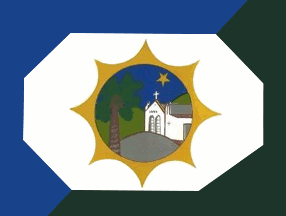
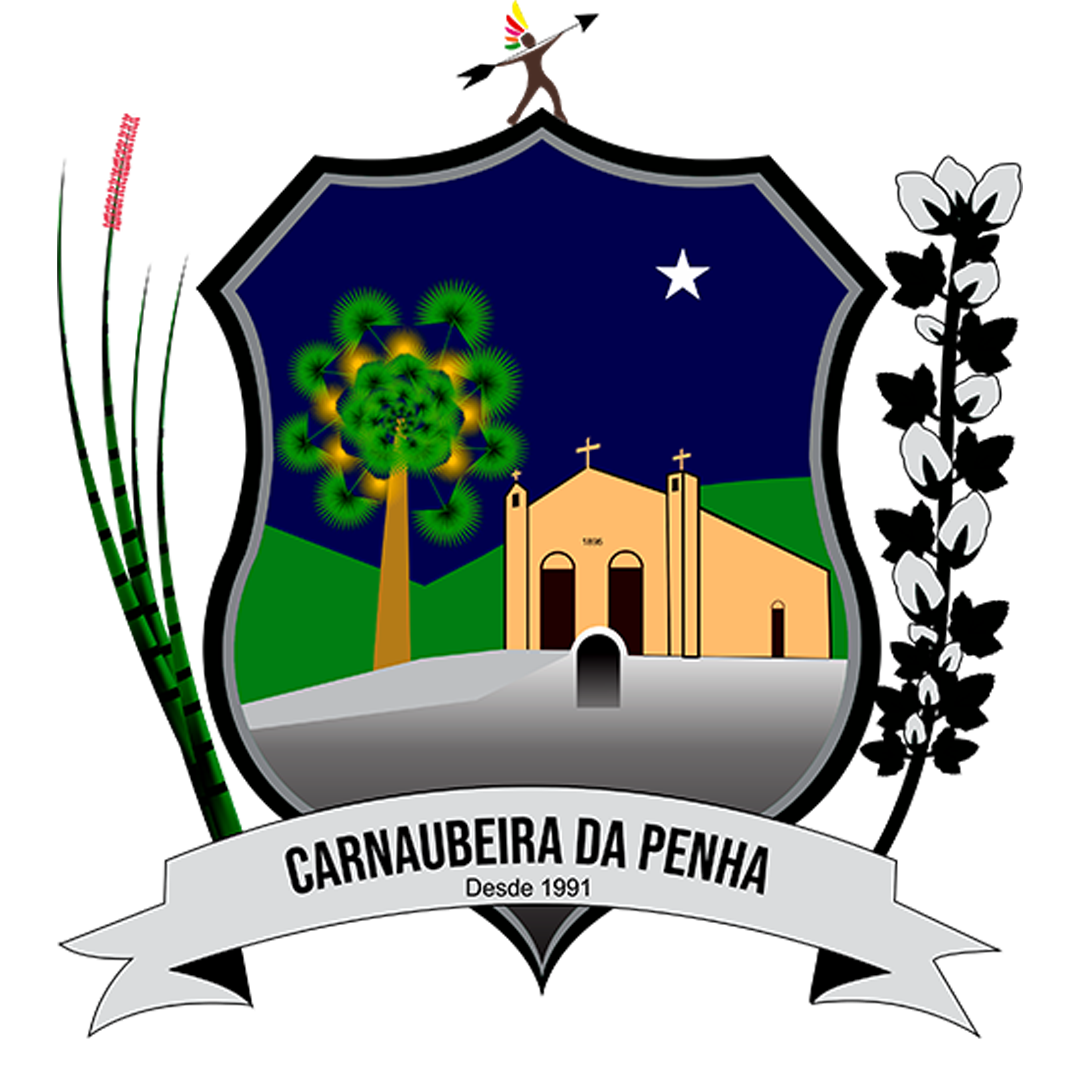
- Flag Coat of arms
- Etymology: "Carnaubeira" originated from the name of the Carnaúba tree abundant in the area and "Penha" named after Our Lady of Penha, the patron saint
- Location of Carnaubeira da Penha in Pernambuco

- Location within Brazil Location within South America
- Coordinates: 8°19′19″S 38°44′38″W
- Country: Brazil
- Region: Northeast
- State: Pernambuco
- Founded: 1 October 1991

Government
  - Mayor: Elizio Soares Filho (PSDB) (2025-2028)
  - Vice Mayor: Joao Thiago Campos Lopes Goncalves (PSD) (2025-2028)

Area
  - Total: 1,004.248 km^{2} (387.742 sq mi)
- Elevation: 446 m (1,463 ft)

Population (2022 Census)
  - Total: 12,239
  - Estimate (2025): 12,712
  - Density: 12.18/km^{2} (31.5/sq mi)
- Demonym: Carnaubeirense (Brazilian Portuguese)
- Time zone: UTC-03:00 (Brasília Time)
- Postal code: 56420-000
- HDI (2010): 0.573 – medium
- Website: carnaubeiradapenha.pe.gov.br

Carnaubeira da Penha (Central northeastern portuguese pronunciation: [kɐɦnɐuˈbeɾɐ dɐ ˈpẽɐ]) is a city in the Brazilian state of Pernambuco, 498 km away from the state's capital, Recife.

== History ==
The unclassified extinct language Aticum or Araticum was spoken near Carnaubeira.

== Demographics ==
The population in 2020, according with IBGE was 13,025 inhabitants and the total area is 1004.67 km².

There are Atikum and Pankará indigenous peoples living in reserves.

== Geography ==
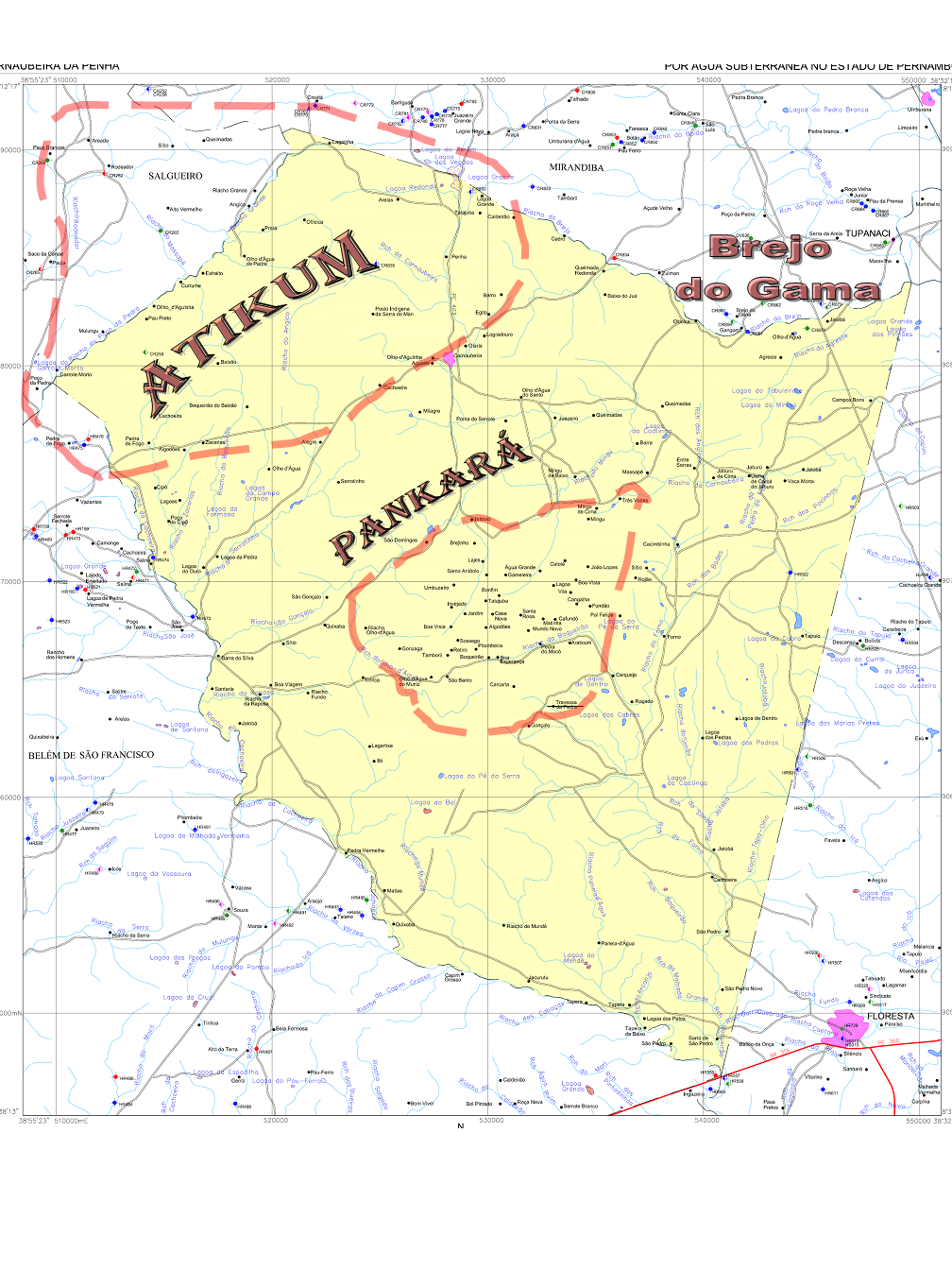
Map showing indigenous presence in Carnaubeira

- State - Pernambuco
- Region - São Francisco Pernambucano
- Boundaries - Salgueiro and Mirandiba (N); Belém de São Francisco (S and W); Floresta (E).
- Area - 1010.17 km²
- Elevation - 446 m
- Hydrography - Pajeú and Terra Nova rivers
- Vegetation - Caatinga hiperxerófila.
- Climate - Semi arid ( Sertão) hot
- Annual average temperature - 25.2 c
- Distance to Recife - 498 km

== Economy ==
The main economic activities in Carnaubeira da Penha are based in agribusiness, especially creation of goats (over 80,000 heads), sheep, cattle, pigs, donkeys, chickens; and plantations of bananas, tomatoes and guava.

=== Economic Indicators ===
Population	GDP x(1000 R$)	GDP pc (R$)	PE
12.451	31.055	2.657	0.05%

Economy by Sector 2006

Primary sector	Secondary sector	Service sector
25.52%	6.58%	67.90%

=== Health Indicators ===
HDI (2000)	Hospitals (2007)	Hospitals beds (2007)	Children's Mortality every 1000 (2005)
0.537	1	18	17.1

== See also ==
- List of municipalities in Pernambuco
