= Bom Nome =

Coordinates: 7°59′41″S 38°37′23″W

Bom Nome is a village and district within the municipality of São José do Belmonte in the state of Pernambuco, Brazil. It is located approximately 19 km southeast of the city São José do Belmonte along BR-361 and approximately 35 km west of the city of Serra Talhada along BR-232.

The village's name, which means "good name," comes from the Capela de Santo Antônio de Bom Nome (Chapel of St. Anthony the Good Name) completed in 1905. The village developed around the chapel. They celebrate St. Anthony's feast day on June 13 each year.

The famous Brazilian composer Moacir Santos (1926–2006) may have been born in the village (sources vary), and certainly came from the same general region.
