= Cedro, Pernambuco =

Municipality in Pernambuco, Brazil

Cedro
- Municipality of Pernambuco, Brazil
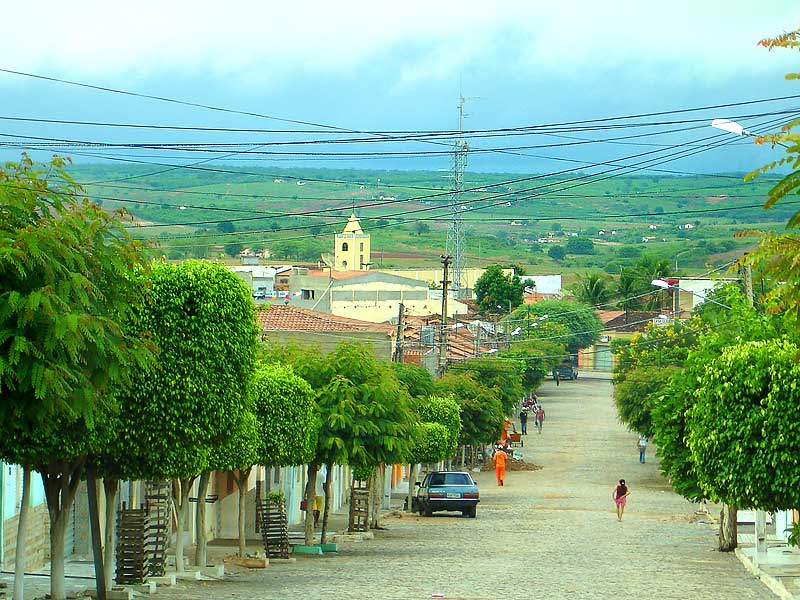
- José Inácio Leite street in Cedro

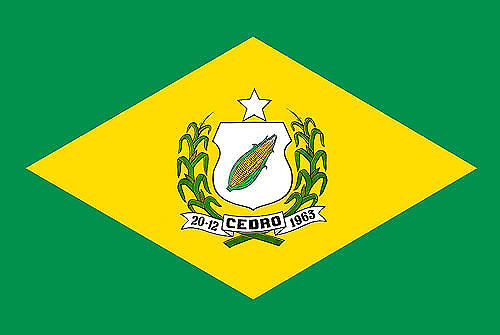
- Flag

- Location of Cedro in Pernambuco

- Location within Brazil Location within South America
- Coordinates: 7°43′19″S 39°14′20″W
- Country: Brazil
- Region: Northeast
- State: Pernambuco
- Founded: 20 December 1963

Government
  - Mayor: Maria Riva Bezerra Rodrigues (PSD) (2025-2028)
  - Vice Mayor: Antonio Inocencio Leite (Republicanos) (2025-2028)

Area
  - Total: 148.746 km^{2} (57.431 sq mi)
- Elevation: 546 m (1,791 ft)

Population (2022 Census)
  - Total: 10,518
  - Estimate (2025): 10,843
  - Density: 70.71/km^{2} (183.1/sq mi)
- Demonym: Cedrense (Brazilian Portuguese)
- Time zone: UTC-03:00 (Brasília Time)
- Postal code: 56130-000
- HDI (2010): 0.615 – medium
- Website: cedro.pe.gov.br

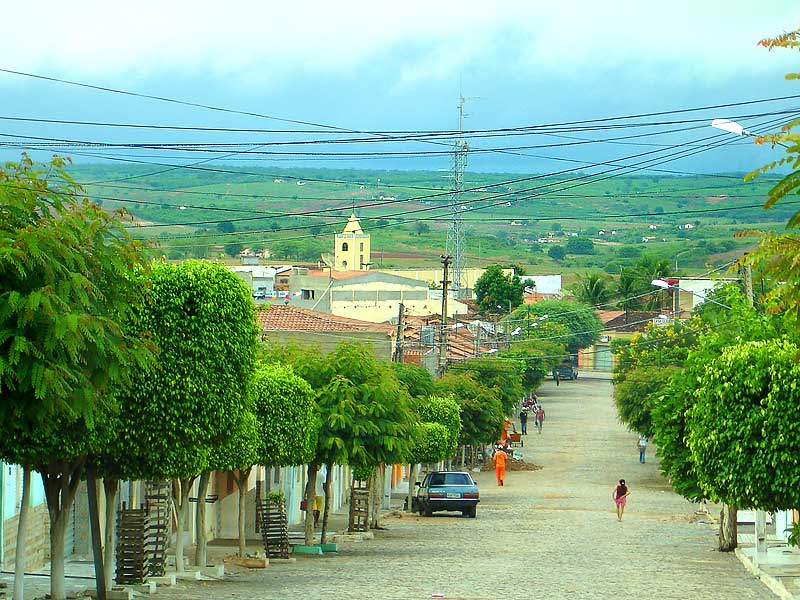

Cedro (Central northeastern portuguese pronunciation: [ˈsɛdɾu]) is a city in the state of Pernambuco, Brazil. The population in 2025, according with IBGE was 10,843 and the area is 148.746 km^{2}.

== Geography ==
- State - Pernambuco
- Region - Sertão Pernambucano
- Boundaries - Ceará state (N); Serrita (S and W); Salgueiro (E).
- Area - 144.09 km^{2}
- Elevation - 546 m
- Hydrography - Terra Nova River
- Vegetation - Caatinga hipoxerófila
- Climate - semi arid - hot and dry
- Annual average temperature - 25.2 c
- Distance to Recife - 561 km

== Economy ==
The main economic activities in Cedro are based in agribusiness, especially creation of cattle, goats, sheep, pigs; and plantations of tomatoes and beans.

=== Economic Indicators ===
Population	GDP x(1000 R$).	GDP pc (R$)	PE
10.784	31.068	3.021	0.05%

Economy by Sector 2006

Primary sector	Secondary sector	Service sector
16.00%	9.05%	74.95%

=== Health Indicators ===
HDI (2000)	Hospitals (2007)	Hospitals beds (2007)	Children's Mortality every 1000 (2005)
0.672	1	18	15

== See also ==
- List of municipalities in Pernambuco
