= Ofício de vaqueiro =

Brazilian cattle management techniques

The ofício de vaqueiro or cultura do vaqueiro (cultura sertaneja in its primitive form) is a traditional activity and culture of cattle management and care that originated in the Brazilian state of Bahia in the 16th century, requiring specific techniques for animal husbandry and having a strong cultural component, including primarily its leather clothing, leather hats, aboio, and bull catching.

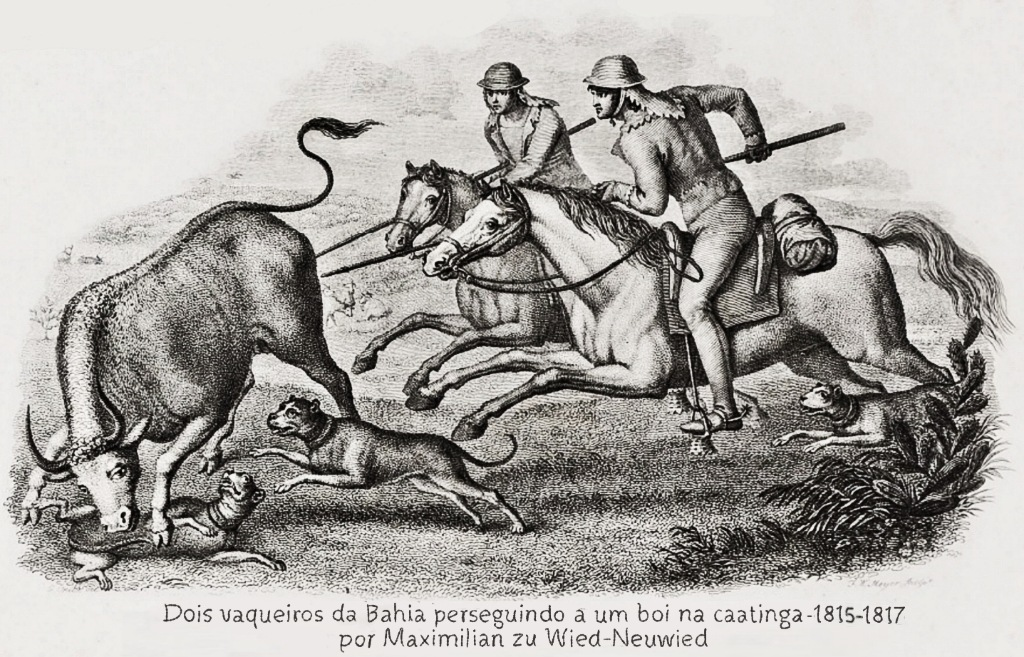
Two vaqueiros from Bahia in leather clothing, alongside a fila brasileiro chasing a bull in the caatinga, as depicted by Prince Maximilian zu Wied-Neuwied in the early 19th century (1815-1817).

The ofício de vaqueiro represents the sertaneja culture in its most primitive form, which originated in Bahia and spread throughout the interior of the Northeast of Brazil, becoming ingrained in the culture and forming its own identity in the region. Today, this culture is present in Bahia, Sergipe, Alagoas, Pernambuco, Paraíba, Rio Grande do Norte, Ceará, Piauí, Maranhão, Tocantins, and northern Minas Gerais. In the 16th century in Bahia, this activity included various functions such as animal feeding, vaccination, management, and reproductive processes. Everything from the cattle was utilized, leading to the vaqueiro's leather clothing: the leather jacket used to protect the arms and torso, the leather hat to protect the head, leggings, and gloves to protect the legs and hands during work, as well as their food, including milk and meat. The meat from the sertão gave rise to carne-seca (dried meat), first recorded in Bahia in 1610.

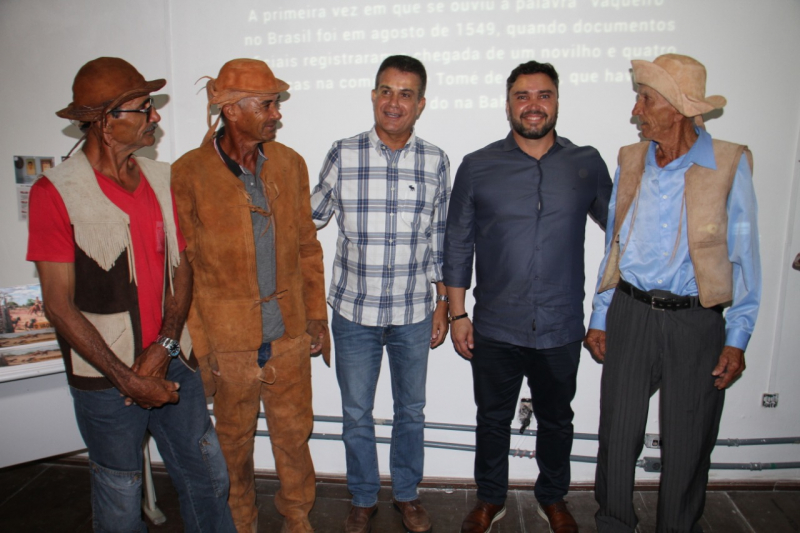
Vaqueiros from Bahia in the historic center of Salvador.

The vaqueiro and his ofício were recognized as cultural heritage of Bahia.

== History ==
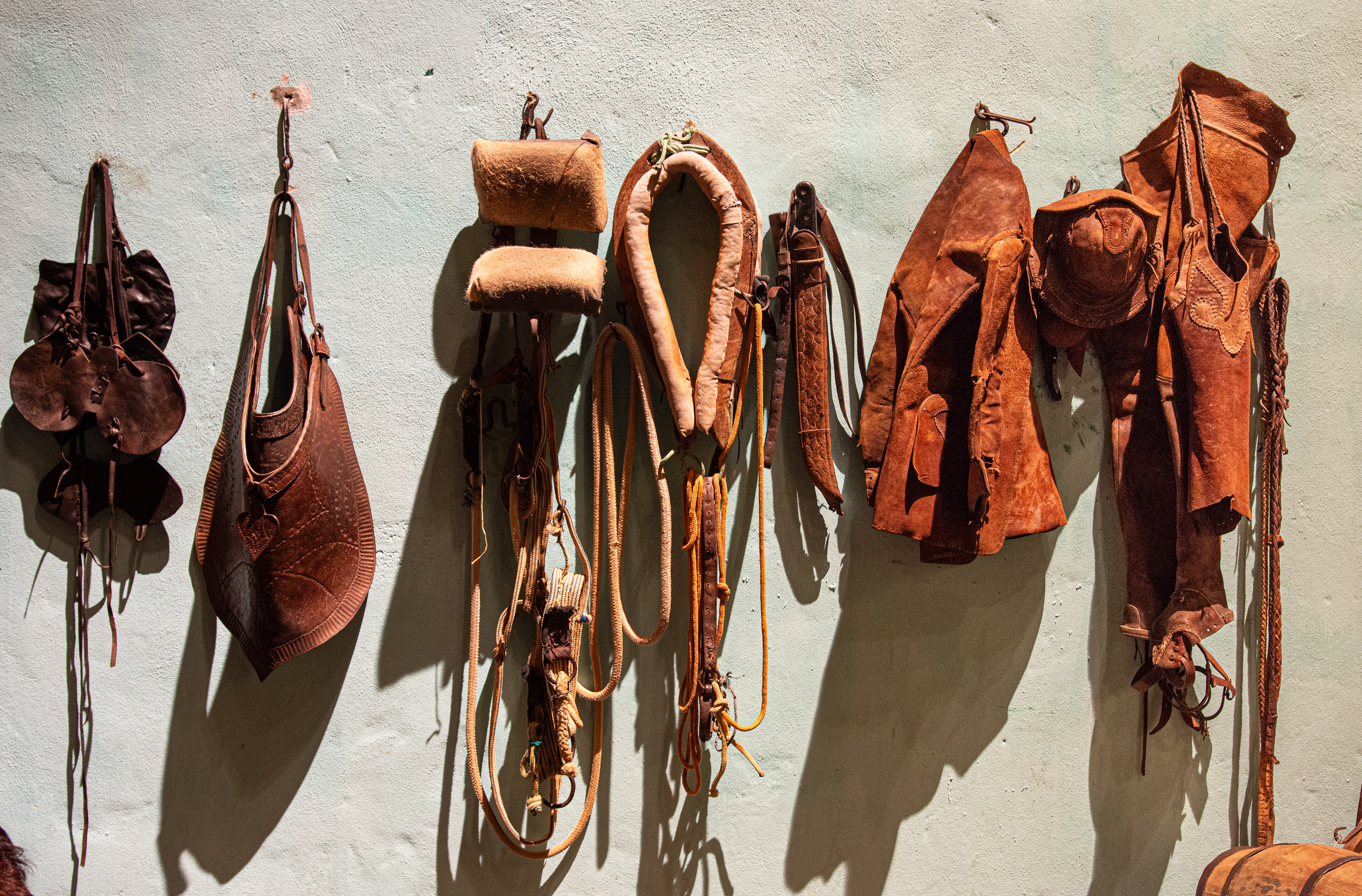
Leather clothing and objects used by the vaqueiros of northeastern Brazil.

The ofício de vaqueiro and his cultura sertaneja (or rural sertão culture) in its most primitive form began when the then Governor General of Brazil and Bahia, Tomé de Souza, introduced cattle ranching in the region of the Recôncavo baiano, where cattle were raised freely among sugar mills. The march of cattle through the backlands began in 1550, undertaken by the d’Ávila with the first vaqueiros. Due to the lack of space for cattle raising in the Recôncavo, men and cattle had to move to the interior of Bahia. With the arrival of García d'Ávila's troop (a nobleman of the Casa da Torre) in the Itapororocas region in the Jacuípe basin (current region of Feira de Santana), the vaqueiro and sertaneja culture emerged in Bahia in the 16th century, with their techniques for cattle care, leather hats, leather clothing, aboio, bull catching, and carne-seca.

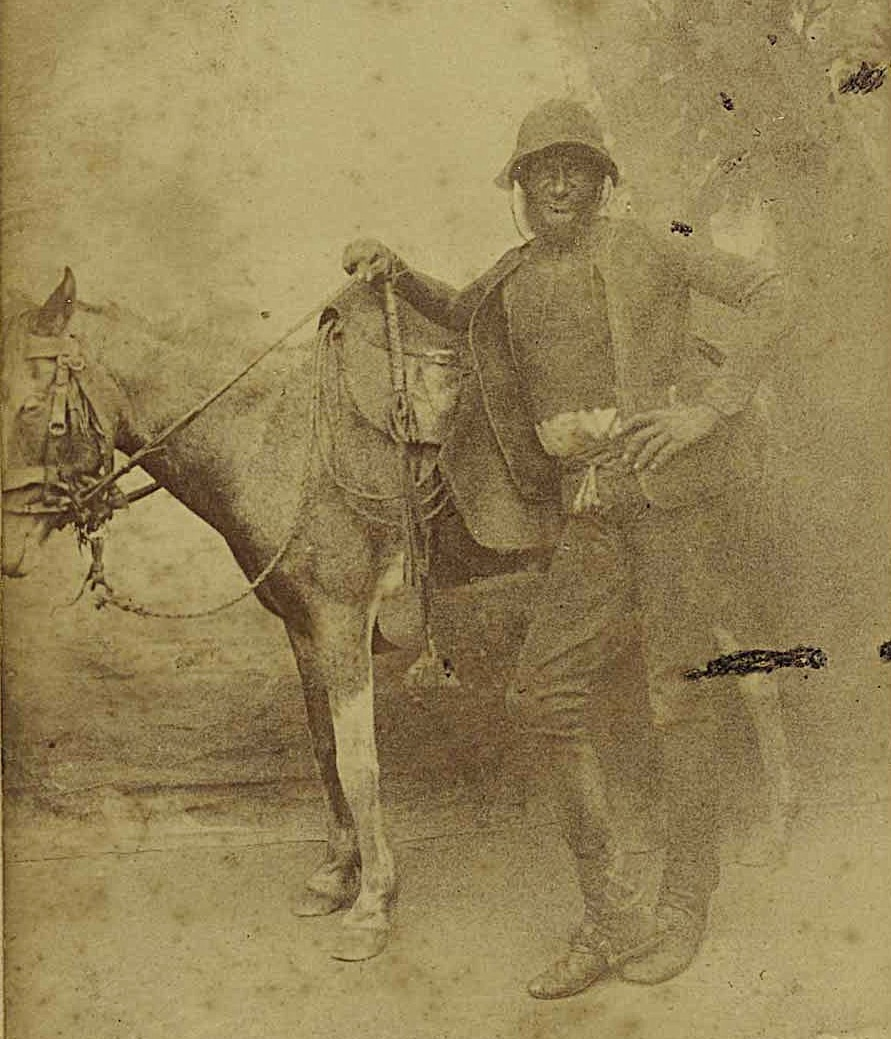
Vaqueiro from Feira de Santana, Bahia in 1880 by Thereza Christina Maria.

These men would expand following the course of rivers to the sertões de dentro of northeastern Brazil, settling, founding several villages and farms, and establishing their culture, which over the years became increasingly rich.

== In popular culture ==
The cultural traits of this vaqueiro profession are celebrated in various cultural manifestations in northeastern Brazil, including events and contests, music, as well as cordel literature, which values sertaneja and vaqueira culture, narrating poems and stories in booklet format.

=== Some influences ===
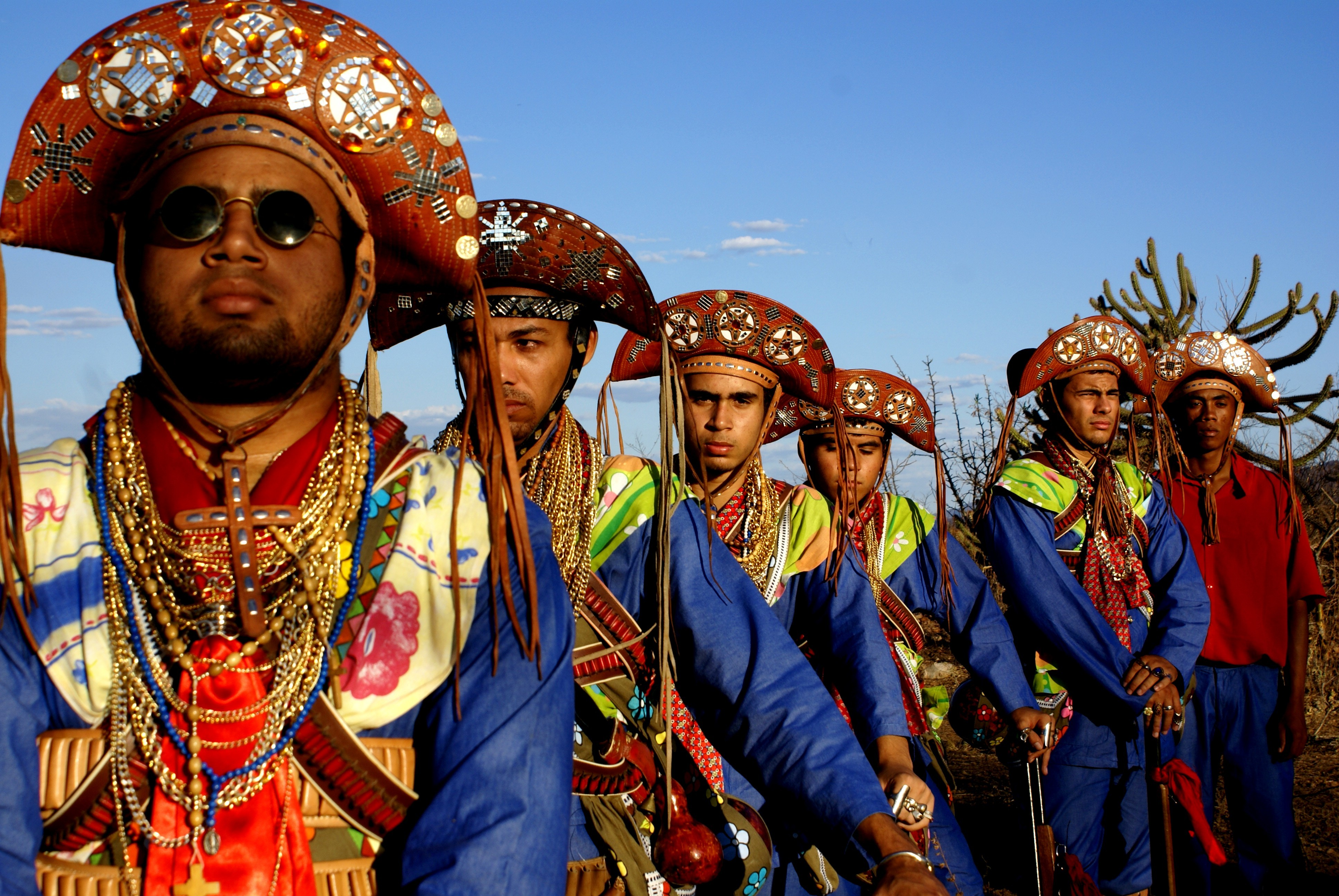
A cultural group in Serra Talhada, Pernambuco with their leather clothing of the cangaceiros (the leather clothing of the cangaceiros has its origins in the vaqueiros).

== Cuisine ==
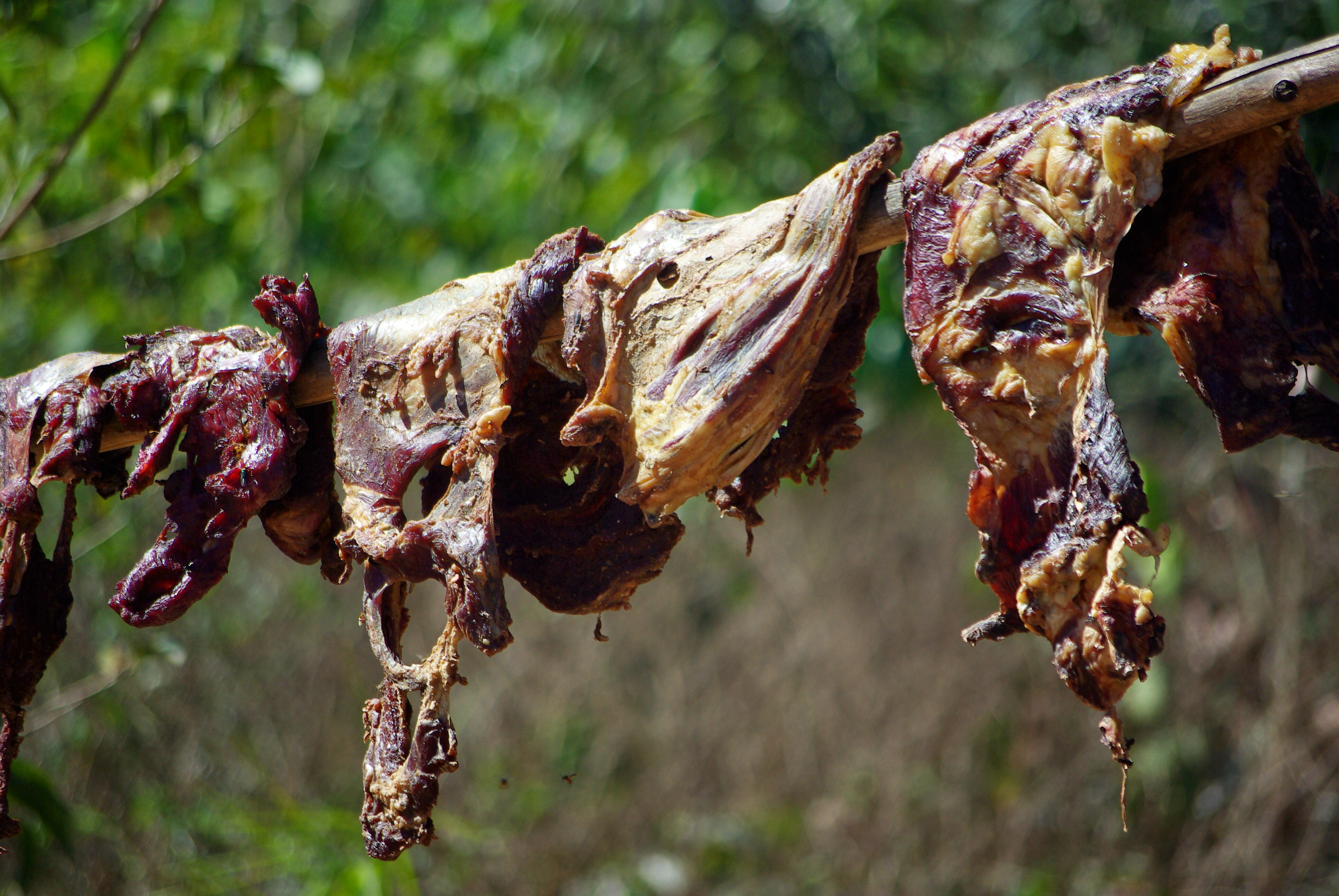
Carne-seca

The cuisine of sertaneja culture has its roots in the vaqueiro profession, with carne-seca being one of its typical foods. For example, its first records date back to 1610 in Bahia, and it reached southern Brazil, especially the state of Rio Grande do Sul. From the combination of carne-seca and flour, paçoca de carne-seca originated, the main dish consumed by the vaqueiros from the beginning of their formation in Bahia, to the present day throughout the Northeast and Brazil. Goat and lamb meat were other important dishes consumed by the vaqueiros, still present today.
