= Anchieta Patriota =

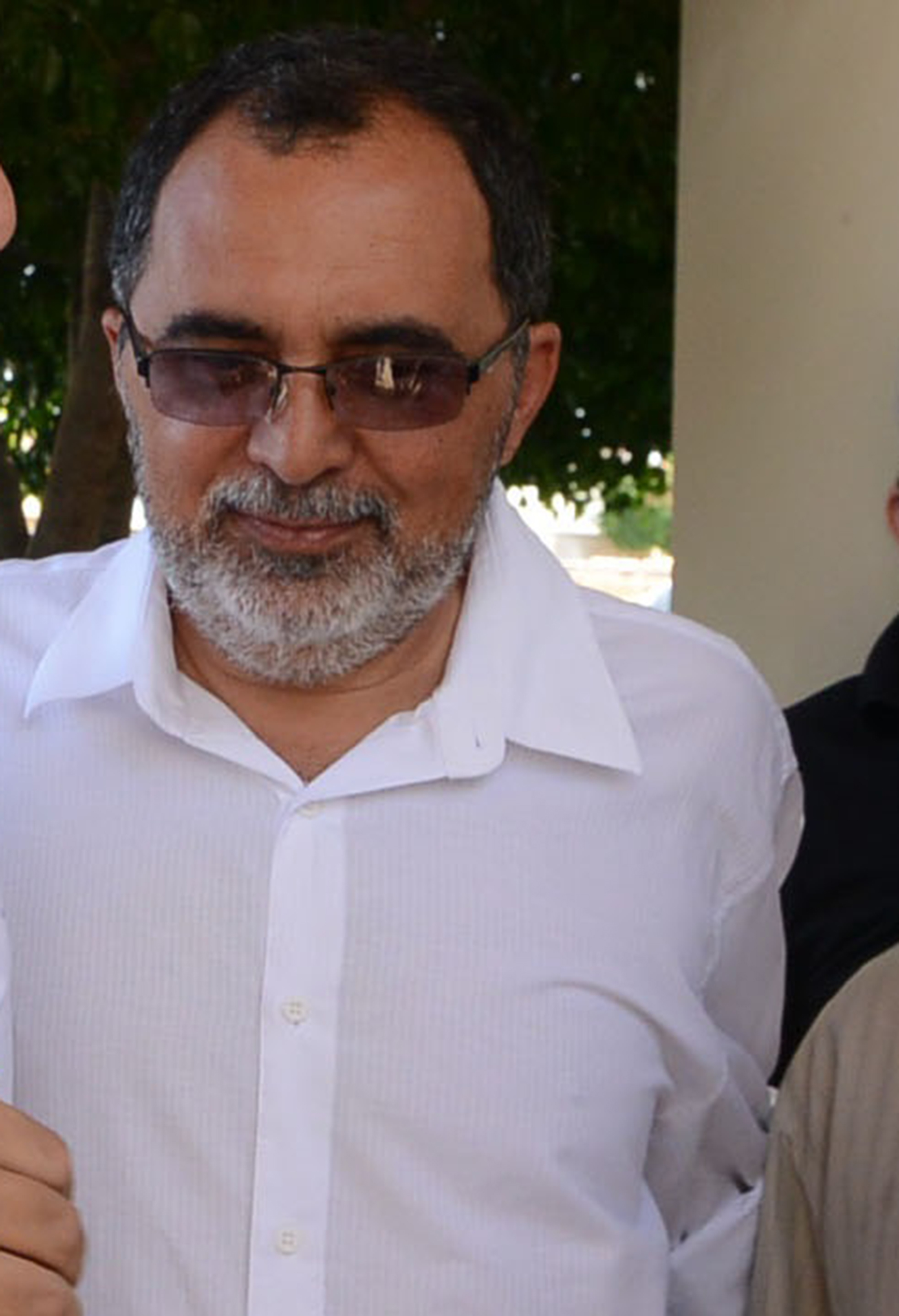
- Anchieta on September 3, 2013

Mayor of Carnaíba
- In office January 1, 2017 – January 1, 2025
- Preceded by: José Mário Cassiano
- Succeeded by: Wamberg Antonio Gomes Amaral
- In office January 1, 2005 – January 1, 2013
- Preceded by: José Francisco Filho
- Succeeded by: José Mário Cassiano

City Councilor of Carnaíba
- In office January 1, 2001 – January 1, 2005

Personal details
- Born: José de Anchieta Gomes Patriota; 31 March 1957 (age 69) Carnaíba, Brazil
- Party: Brazilian Socialist Party

José de Anchieta Gomes Patriota (born 31 March 1957) is a Brazilian politician and former mayor of Carnaíba. He has been a member of the Brazilian Socialist Party since the mid-1990s.

== Early life ==
Patriota was born in Carnaíba in 1957. He lived by the Pajéu River throughout his childhood. He attended elementary school at two schools in his hometown: Joaquim Mendes da Silva and João Gomes dos Reis. He completed high school in Serra Talhada and Recife. He later became an obstetrician-gynecologist.

== Career ==
In 1982, Patriota began his political career as a candidate for mayor in Carnaíba, losing to José Francisco Filho. In 1992, he was appointed as the running mate of Expedito Tenorio de Oliveira. From 1995 to 1998, he was director of the former X DIRES under governor Miguel Arraes in Pernambuco., during his term as director, he ran for mayor again. In 2000, he ran for city council, where he was elected.

In 2003, he was elected president of the city council of Carnaíba. In 2004, he won the election for mayor. Carnaiba was awarded the best IDEPE (Pernambuco Education Development Index) in the state, structured municipal health. He was highlighted in the caravan conducted by the regional council of medicine of Pernambuco. He created the music school Maestro Israel Gomes.

He was re-elected in 2008. In January 2013, he became the executive secretary of special projects of the secretary of cities of the state government. He ran for state deputy in 2014. In 2016, he was again a mayoral candidate, winning for the Brazilian Socialist Party (PSB) with 8,294 votes or 72.8%. was again candidate for mayor in the 2020 mayoral election, Anchieta was re-elected on November 15, 2020 for a fourth term, winning with 6,135 votes or 53.67% against 5,296 votes or 46.33% of Podemos candidate, Gleybson Martins
