= Flores, Pernambuco =

Municipality of Pernambuco, Brazil

Flores
- Municipality
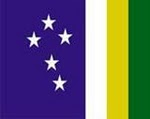
- Flag Coat of arms

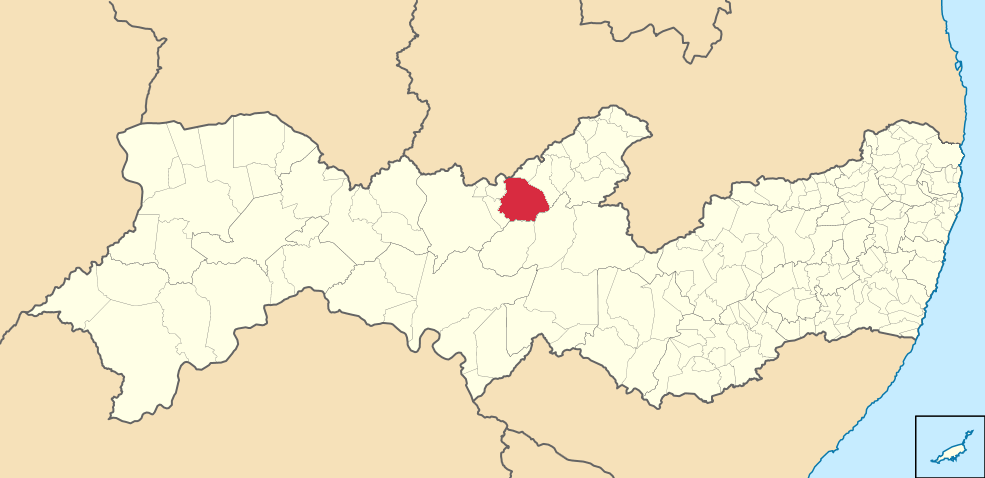
- Location in Pernambuco state

- Location in Brazil
- Coordinates: 7°51′57″S 37°58′30″W
- Country: Brazil
- Region: Northeast
- State: Pernambuco
- Mesoregion: Sertão Pernambucano

Area
  - Total: 996 km^{2} (385 sq mi)

Population (2022 Census)
  - Total: 20,347
  - Estimate (2025): 20,776
  - Density: 20.4/km^{2} (52.9/sq mi)
- Time zone: UTC−3 (BRT)

Flores (Central northeastern portuguese pronunciation: [ˈfloɾis]) (Portuguese for "Flowers") is a municipality (município) in the state of Pernambuco in Brazil. The population is 20,776 (2025 est.) in an area of 995.56 km^{2}.

== Geography ==
- Boundaries - Paraíba state and Quixaba (N); Betânia (S); Carnaíba and Custódia (E); Triunfo and Calumbi (W)
- Elevation - 466 m
- Hydrography - Pajeú River
- Vegetation - Caatinga hiperxerófila.
- Clima - Semi desertic ( Sertão) hot and dry
- Annual average temperature - 25.0 c
- Distance to Recife - 385 km

== Economy ==
The main economic activities in Flores are based in agribusiness, especially creation of cattle and their milk, goats, sheep and plantations with beans, corn and guava (goiaba).

=== Economic Indicators ===
Population	GDP x(1000 R$).	GDP pc (R$)	PE
23.034	59.354	2.703	0.097%

Economy by Sector

Primary sector	Secondary sector	Service sector
20.39%	9.10%	70.51%

=== Health Indicators ===
HDI (2000)	Hospitals (2007)	Hospitals beds (2007)	Children's mortality every 1000 (2005)
0.613	1	22	27.5

== See also ==
- List of municipalities in Pernambuco
