= Calumbi =

Municipality of Pernambuco, Brazil

- Municipality
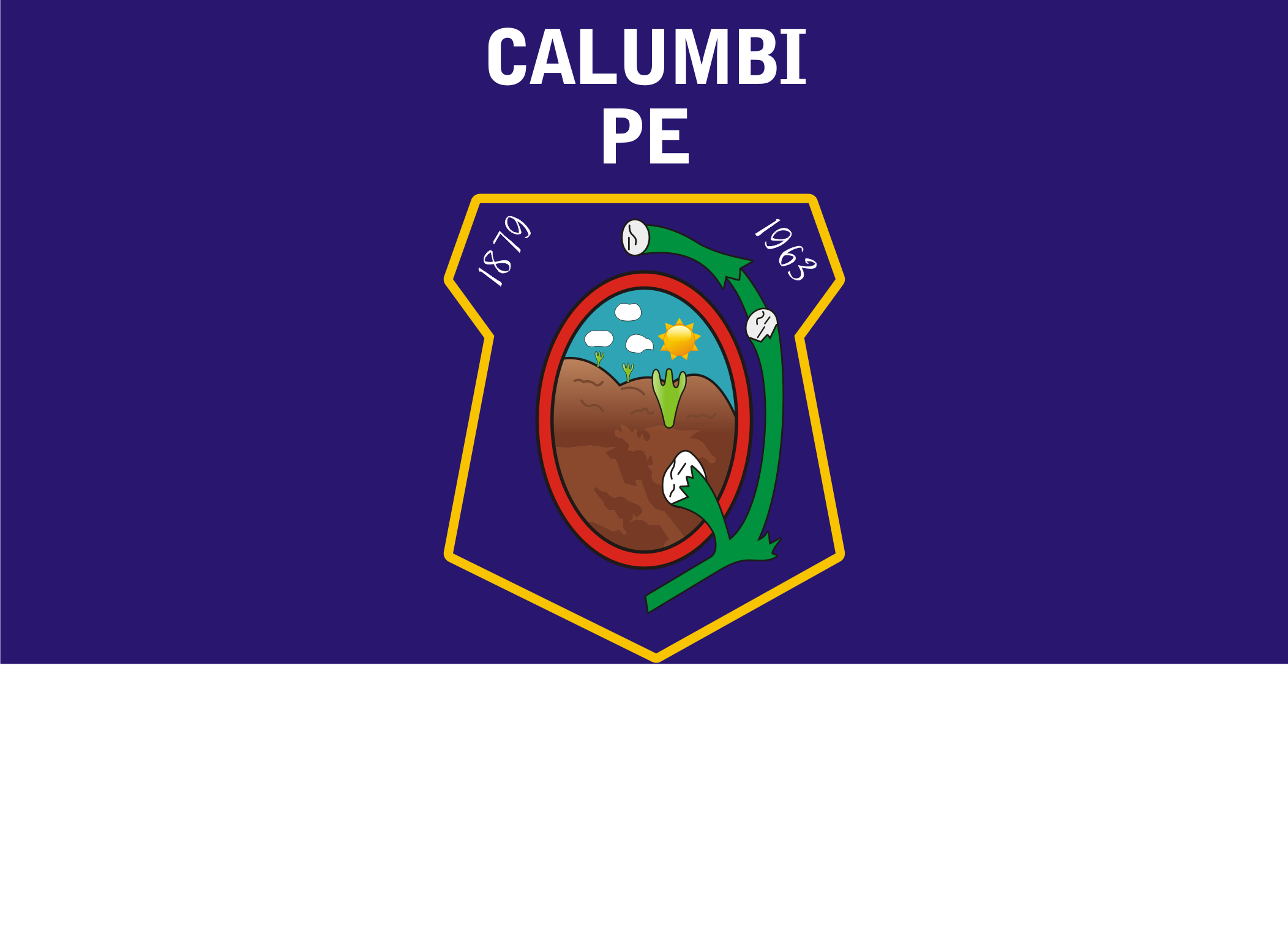
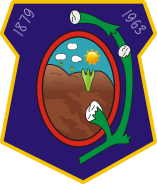
- Flag Coat of arms
- Etymology: Named after the Calumbi shrub (Mimosa tenuiflora)
- Location of Calumbi in Pernambuco

- Location within Brazil Location within South America
- Coordinates: 7°56′27″S 38°09′00″W
- Country: Brazil
- Region: Northeast
- State: Pernambuco
- Founded: 20 December 1963

Government
  - Mayor: Erivaldo Jose da Silva (Avante) (2025-2028)
  - Vice Mayor: Maria de Lourdes Brasileiro Nascimento (Republicanos) (2025-2028)

Area
  - Total: 179.314 km^{2} (69.234 sq mi)
- Elevation: 446 m (1,463 ft)

Population (2022 Census)
  - Total: 5,228
  - Estimate (2025): 5,354
  - Density: 29.16/km^{2} (75.5/sq mi)
- Demonym: Calumbiense (Brazilian Portuguese)
- Time zone: UTC-03:00 (Brasília Time)
- Postal code: 56930-000
- HDI (2010): 0.571 – medium
- Website: calumbi.pe.gov.br

Calumbi (Central northeastern portuguese pronunciation: [kɐlũˈbi]) is a city in the state of Pernambuco, Brazil. The population in 2025, according to the IBGE, was 5,354 inhabitants. The total area is 179.31 km^{2}.

== Geography ==
- State - Pernambuco
- Region - Sertão Pernambucano
- Boundaries - Triunfo and Santa Cruz da Baixa Verde (N); Betânia (S); Flores (E); Serra Talhada (W)
- Area - 221.04 km^{2}
- Elevation - 446 m
- Hydrography - Pajeú River
- Vegetation - Caatinga Hiperxerófila
- Climate - Semi-arid, hot and dry
- Annual average temperature - 24.8 c
- Distance to Recife - 408 km

== Economy ==
The main economic activities in Calumbi are based in agribusiness, especially the raising of cattle, sheep, goats, and chickens, and plantations of tomatoes and bananas .

=== Economic indicators ===
Population	GDP x(1000 R$).	GDP pc (R$)	PE
7.977	19.250	2.541	0.031%

Economy by sector 2006

Primary sector	Secondary sector	Service sector
8.68%	9.36%	81.96%

=== Health indicators ===
HDI (2000)	Hospitals (2007)	Hospitals beds (2007)	Children's mortality every 1000 (2005)
0.580	1	12	13.1

== See also ==
- List of municipalities in Pernambuco
