= José Mário Cassiano =

Brazilian politician

The mayor of Carnaíba Zé Mário Cassiano
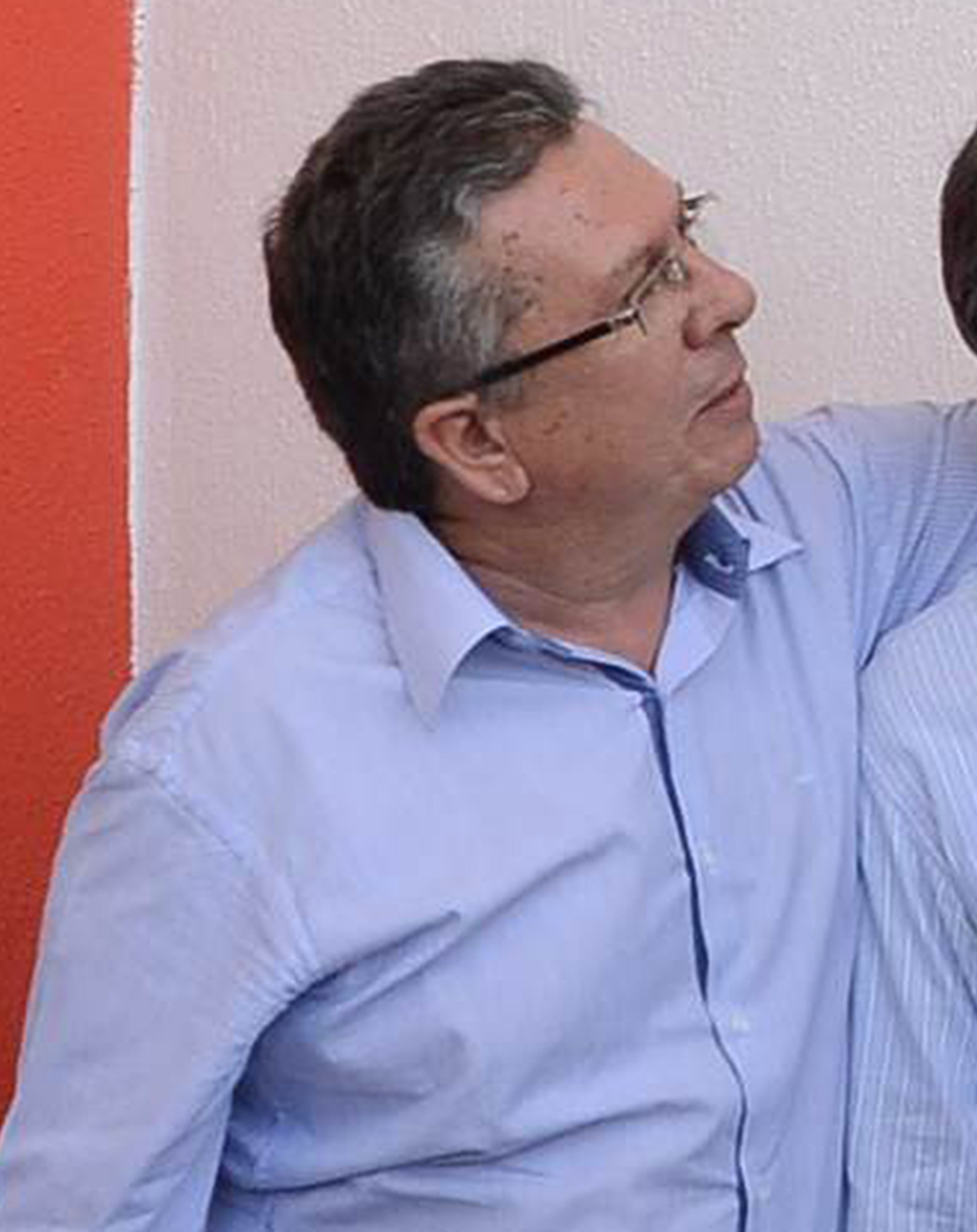
- Zé in September 3, 2013

Mayor of Carnaíba
- In office January 1st, 2013 – January 1st, 2017
- Preceded by: Anchieta Patriota
- Succeeded by: Anchieta Patriota

Personal details
- Born: José Mário Cassiano Bezerra; 5 December 1958 (age 67) Carnaíba, Brazil
- Party: Brazilian Socialist Party

José Mário Cassiano Bezerra, popularly known as Zé Mário (born 5 December 1958) is a Brazilian politician and merchant. He was mayor of Carnaíba during the term 2013–2017. He is a member of the Brazilian Socialist Party.

== Career ==
in 2000, Mário was the PSB mayoral candidate in Carnaíba against Didi da Felicidade, losing with 3,554 votes. in 2012 he was mayoral candidate again, this time against Ione Francisco (PR), he was supported by the very popular incumbent mayor, Anchieta Patriota. he won the election with 8.547 votes (74.8%) having as vice-mayor in his campaign Jeovane Adriano.

Zé Mário's term was started on January 1, 2013 and the beginning of his government was marked by the inauguration of the Paulo Freire State Technical School (ETE) that took place on September 3, 2013. In his government, Carnaíba celebrated 60 years of his political emancipation that took place on December 30, 1953. in 2014 he inaugurated the Riacho do Peixe and Capim Grosso dams. That year he was also fined by the TCE for failing to correct irregularities in the City Hall's Competition notice for hiring school transport services.

in 2015, Carnaíba faced a water crisis caused by the drought in the slipper dam, but in the end with the rains, the dam filled again. That year he also started new paving works for the city.

Zé Mário ended his term as mayor on January 1, 2017, formally transitioning the position to his predecessor, Anchieta Patriota.

== Life after city hall ==
Zé Mário currently lives in the center of the city of Carnaíba, he withdrew from public life after leaving the command of his city, in 2020 he suffered a great blow with the death of his mother, Nita Bezerra.
