= Carneseca =

Carne seca may refer to:

- Carne-seca, a kind of dried, salted meat, usually beef, used in Brazilian cuisine
- Carne seca, a kind of dried beef in Mexican cuisine
- Lou Carnesecca (1925–2024), American college basketball coach
- Carnesecca Arena, an arena named after Lou Carnesecca
