= Betânia, Pernambuco =

City in Pernambuco, Brazil

Betânia
- Municipality of Pernambuco, Brazil
- Flag Coat of arms

- Location of Betânia in Pernambuco

- Location within Brazil Location within South America
- Coordinates: 8°16′33″S 38°2′2″W
- Country: Brazil
- Region: Northeast
- State: Pernambuco
- Founded: 19 March 1962

Government
  - Mayor: Erivaldo Severino Bezerra (PSB) (2025-2028)
  - Vice Mayor: Francidalva de Queiroz Silveira Freire (PSB) (2025-2028)

Area
  - Total: 1,256.138 km^{2} (484.998 sq mi)
- Elevation: 441 m (1,447 ft)

Population (2022 Census)
  - Total: 11,232
  - Estimate (2025): 11,961
  - Density: 9.03/km^{2} (23.4/sq mi)
- Demonym: Betaniense (Brazilian Portuguese)
- Time zone: UTC-03:00 (Brasília Time)
- Postal code: 56670-000, 56680-000
- HDI (2010): 0.559 – medium
- Website: betania.pe.gov.br

Betânia (Central northeastern portuguese pronunciation: [bɛˈtɐ̃njɐ]) (Bethany) is a city in the state of Pernambuco, Brazil. The population in 2025, according to IBGE, was 11,961 and the area is 1256,138 km².

The municipality contains the 1,485 hectares (3,670 acres) Maurício Dantas Private Natural Heritage Ecological Reserve, created in 1997. The municipality was designated a priority area for conservation and sustainable use when the 5,900,000-hectare Caatinga Ecological Corridor was created in 2006.

== Geography ==
- State - Pernambuco
- Region - Sertão Pernambucano
- Boundaries - Flores and Calumbi (N); Floresta (S); Custódia (E); Serra Talhada and Floresta (W)
- Area - 1244.07 km²
- Elevation - 441 m
- Hydrography - Pajeú River
- Vegetation - Caatinga hiperxerófila
- Climate - semi arid - hot and dry
- Annual average temperature - 28.0 c
- Distance to Recife - 391 km

== Economy ==
The main economic activities in Betânia are based in agribusiness, especially creation of goats, cattle, sheep; and plantations of corn, tomatoes and beans.

=== Economic Indicators ===
Population	GDP x(1000 R$).	GDP pc (R$)	PE
12.011	33.376	2.890	0.055%

Economy by Sector 2006

Primary sector	Secondary sector	Service sector
19.17%	7.86%	72.97%

=== Health Indicators ===
HDI (2000)	Hospitals (2007)	Hospitals beds (2007)	Children's Mortality every 1000 (2005)
0.593	1	30	55.3

== See also ==
- List of municipalities in Pernambuco
