= Santa Cruz da Baixa Verde =

Municipality of Pernambuco, Brazil

- Municipality of Pernambuco, Brazil
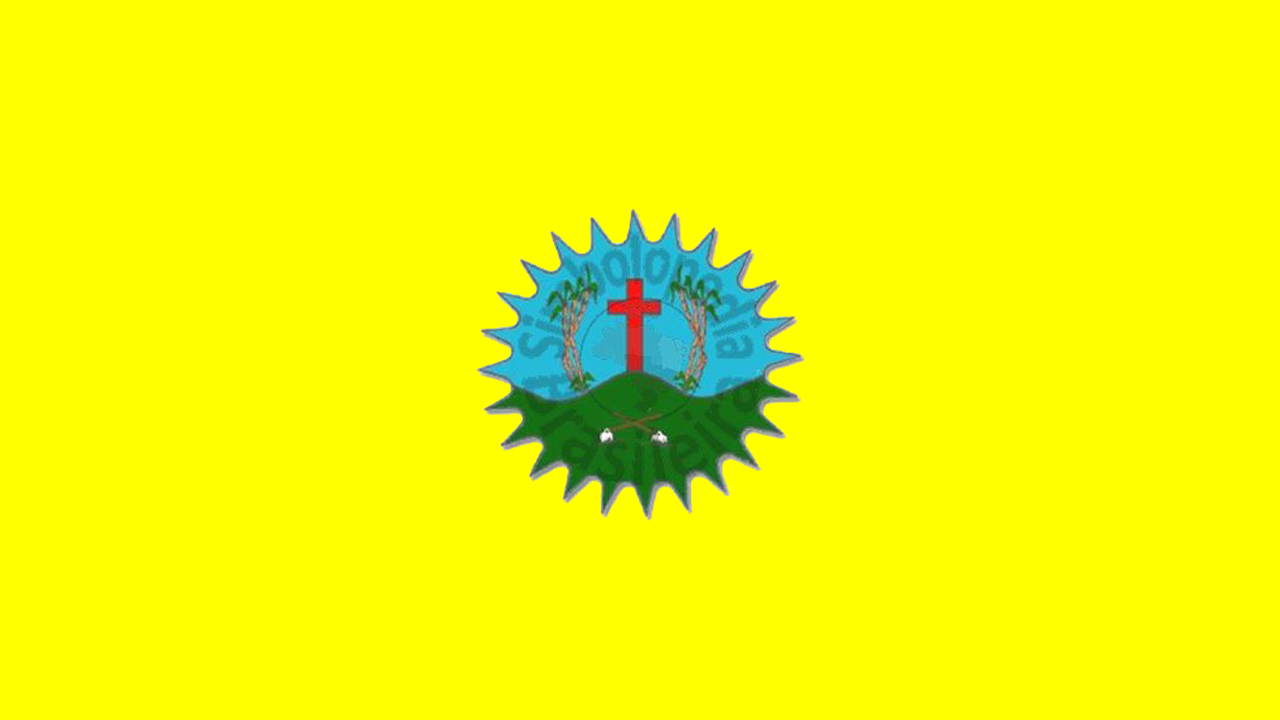
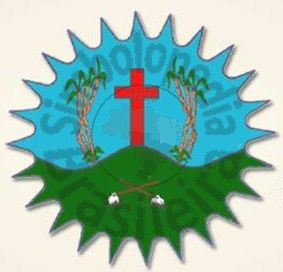
- Flag Coat of arms

- Location of Santa Cruz da Baixa Verde in Pernambuco

- Location within Brazil Location within South America
- Coordinates: 7°49′15″S 38°9′10″W
- Country: Brazil
- Region: Northeast
- State: Pernambuco
- Founded: 1 January 1991

Government
  - Mayor: Ismael Quintino Leite de Sousa (Republicanos) (2025-2028)
  - Vice Mayor: Alex Sandro Alves de Lima (Republicanos) (2025-2028)

Area
  - Total: 114.931 km^{2} (44.375 sq mi)
- Elevation: 900 m (3,000 ft)

Population (2022 Census)
  - Total: 11,567
  - Estimate (2025): 11,934
  - Density: 100.64/km^{2} (260.7/sq mi)
- Demonym: Santacruzense (Brazilian Portuguese)
- Time zone: UTC-03:00 (Brasília Time)
- Postal code: 56895-000
- HDI (2010): 0.612 – medium

Santa Cruz da Baixa Verde (Central northeastern portuguese pronunciation: [ˈsɐ̃tɐ ˈkɾujɦ dɐ ˈbaʃɐ ˈveɦdi]) is a city in the state of Pernambuco, Brazil. According to IBGE, its population was 11,934 in 2025 and the city's total area is 114.93 km^{2}.

== Geography ==
- State - Pernambuco
- Region - Sertão Pernambucano
- Boundaries - Paraíba state (N); Serra Talhada and Calumbi (S); Triunfo (E); Serra Talhada (W).
- Area - 114.93 km²
- Elevation - 850 m
- Hydrography - Pajeú River
- Vegetation - Subcaducifólia forest
- Climate - Mediterranean climate
- Annual average temperature - 21.9 c
- Distance to Recife - 437 km

== Economy ==
The main economic activities in Santa Cruz da Baixa Verde are based in commerce and agribusiness, especially creation of cattle, sheep, goats, pigs, chickens; and plantations of sugarcane and beans.

=== Economic Indicators ===
Population	GDP x(1000 R$).	GDP pc (R$)	PE
12.209	28.671	2.470	0.045%

Economy by Sector 2006

Primary sector	Secondary sector	Service sector
11.96%	7.86%	80.18%

=== Health Indicators ===
HDI (2000)	Hospitals (2007)	Hospitals beds (2007)	Children's Mortality every 1000 (2005)
0.655	---	---	34.0

== See also ==
- List of municipalities in Pernambuco
