= Quixaba =

Municipality of Pernambuco, Brazil

- Municipality of Pernambuco, Brazil
- Flag Coat of arms

- Location of Quixaba in Pernambuco

- Location within Brazil Location within South America
- Coordinates: 7°43′12″S 37°50′52″W
- Country: Brazil
- Region: Northeast
- State: Pernambuco
- Founded: 1 October 1991

Government
  - Mayor: Jose Pereira Nunes (Avante) (2025-2028)
  - Vice Mayor: José Pereira de Andrade (Avante) (2025-2028)

Area
  - Total: 210.705 km^{2} (81.354 sq mi)
- Elevation: 542 m (1,778 ft)

Population (2022 Census)
  - Total: 6,554
  - Estimate (2025): 6,753
  - Density: 31.11/km^{2} (80.6/sq mi)
- Demonym: Quixabense (Brazilian Portuguese)
- Time zone: UTC-03:00 (Brasília Time)
- Postal code: 56828-000
- HDI (2010): 0.577 – medium
- Website: quixaba.pe.gov.br

Quixaba (Central northeastern portuguese pronunciation: [kiˈʃabɐ]) is a city in the state of Pernambuco, Brazil. The population in 2025, according with IBGE was 6,753 inhabitants and the total area is 210.705 km².

== Geography ==
- State - Pernambuco
- Region - Sertão Pernambucano
- Boundaries - Paraíba state (N and W); Flores (S); Carnaíba (E).
- Area - 209.96 km²
- Elevation - 625 m
- Hydrography - Pajeú River
- Vegetation - Caatinga hiperxerófila
- Climate - semi arid - (Sertão) hot
- Annual average temperature - 23.5 c
- Distance to Recife - 416 km

== Economy ==
The main economic activities in Quixaba are agribusiness, especially creation of cattle, sheep, goats, chickens; and plantations of beans and corn.

=== Economic Indicators ===
Population	GDP x(1000 R$).	GDP pc (R$)	PE
7.116	20.828	3.030	0.036%

Economy by Sector 2006

Primary sector	Secondary sector	Service sector
17.22%	7.54%	75.24%

=== Health Indicators ===
HDI (2000)	Hospitals (2007)	Hospitals beds (2007)	Children's Mortality every 1000 (2005)
0.581	---	---	18.0

== See also ==
- List of municipalities in Pernambuco
