= Custódia =

Municipality of Pernambuco, Brazil

- Municipality of Pernambuco, Brazil
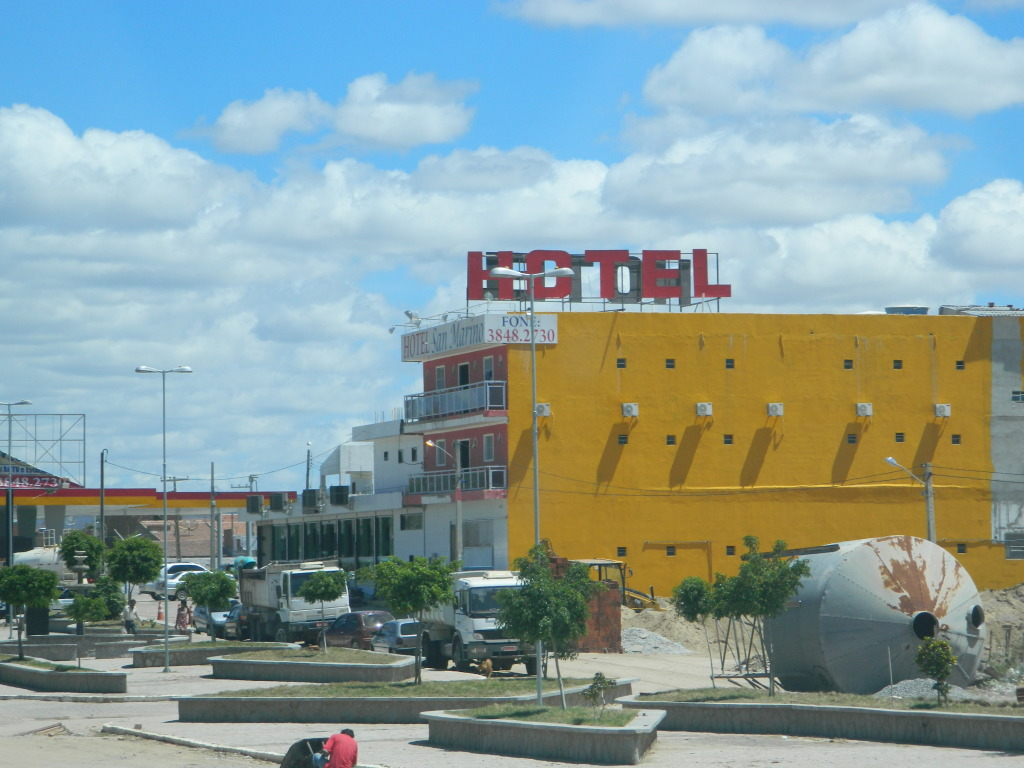
- Custódia

- Flag

- Location of Custódia in Pernambuco

- Location within Brazil Location within South America
- Coordinates: 8°5′15″S 37°38′35″W
- Country: Brazil
- Region: Northeast
- State: Pernambuco
- Founded: 11 December 1928

Government
  - Mayor: Manoel Messias de Souza (PSD) (2025-2028)
  - Vice Mayor: Anne Lucia Torres Campos de Lira (MDB) (2025-2028)

Area
  - Total: 1,382.059 km^{2} (533.616 sq mi)
- Elevation: 542 m (1,778 ft)

Population (2022 Census)
  - Total: 37,699
  - Estimate (2025): 39,609
  - Density: 26.85/km^{2} (69.5/sq mi)
- Demonym: Custodiense (Brazilian Portuguese)
- Time zone: UTC-03:00 (Brasília Time)
- Postal code: 56640-000, 56650-000, 56660-000
- HDI (2010): 0.594 – medium
- Website: custodia.pe.gov.br

Custódia (Central northeastern portuguese pronunciation: [kuʃˈtɔdjɐ]) is a ciy in the state of Pernambuco, Brazil. The population in 2025, according to IBGE was 39,609 inhabitants and the total area is 1404.1 km².

== Geography ==
- State - Pernambuco
- Region - Sertão Pernambucano
- Boundaries - Iguaraci and Carnaíba (N); Floresta and Ibimirim (S); Sertânia (E); Betânia and Flores (W).
- Area - 1404.1 km²
- Elevation - 542 m
- Hydrography - Pajeú and Moxotó rivers
- Vegetation - Caatinga hiperxerófila
- Climate - semi arid - (Sertão) hot
- Annual average temperature - 24.0 c
- Distance to Recife - 334.4 km

== Economy ==
The main economic activities in Custódia are based in food & beverage industry, commerce and agribusiness, especially creation of goats, sheep, cattle, pigs, horses, chickens; and plantations of onions, beans and tomatoes.

=== Economic Indicators ===
Population	GDP x(1000 R$).	GDP pc (R$)	PE
33.874	116.006	3.608	0.19%

Economy by Sector 2006

Primary sector	Secondary sector	Service sector
10.61%	16.58%	72.81%

=== Health Indicators ===
HDI (2000)	Hospitals (2007)	Hospitals beds (2007)	Children's Mortality every 1000 (2005)
0.653	1	38	18.4

== See also ==
- List of municipalities in Pernambuco
