= Serra Talhada Airport =

Santa Magalhães Airport Aeroporto de Santa Magalhães

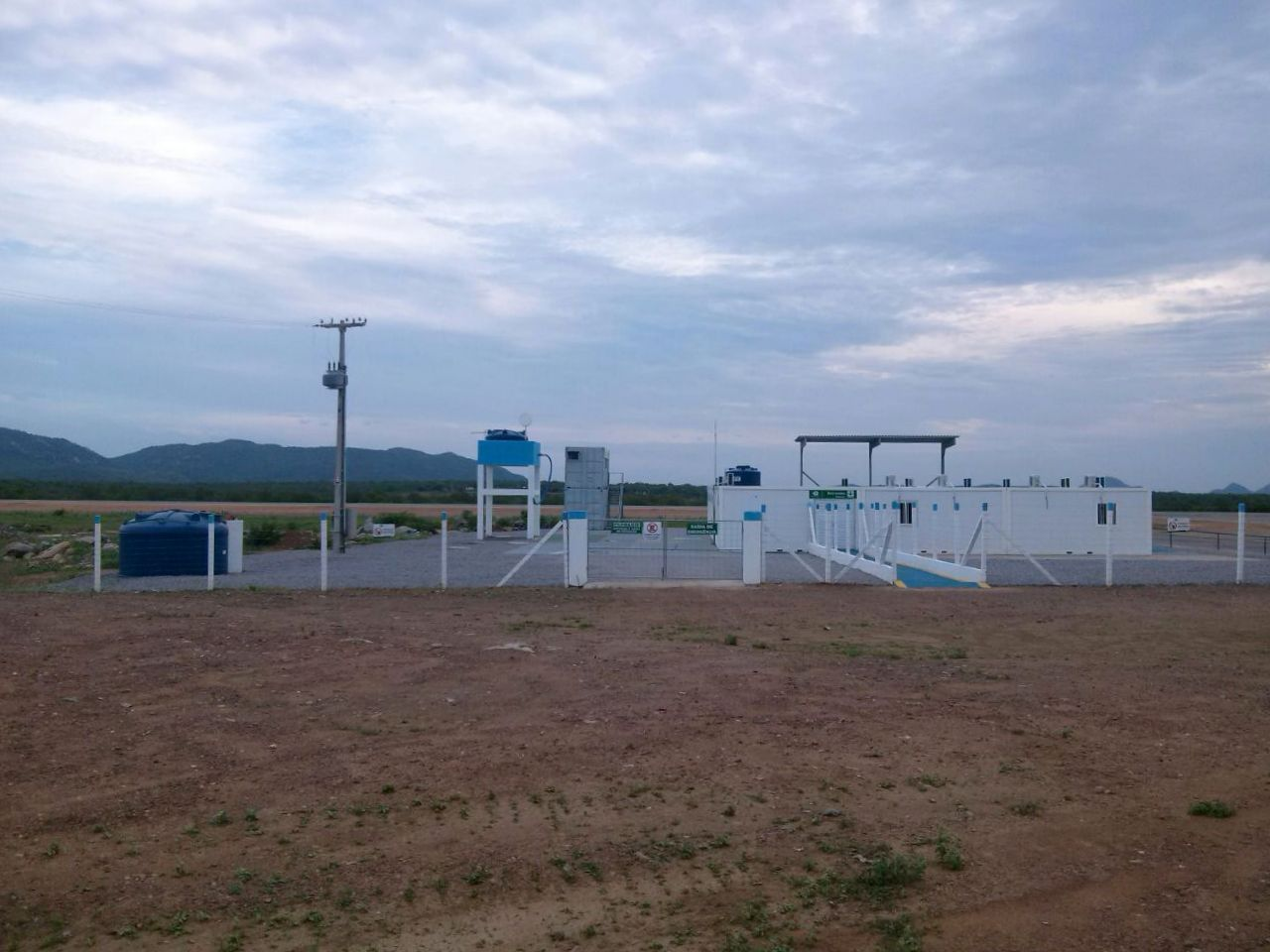
- IATA: SET; ICAO: SNHS; LID: PE0005

Summary
- Airport type: Public
- Operator: Infracea (?–2022); Dix (2022–2025); GRU Airport (2025-present)
- Serves: Serra Talhada
- Time zone: BRT (UTC−03:00)
- Elevation AMSL: 470 m (1,540 ft)
- Coordinates: 08°03′41″S 038°19′43″W

Map
- Location in Brazil

Runways
Direction	Length		Surface
Direction	m	ft	Surface
13/31	1,800	5,906	Asphalt
- Sources: ANAC, DECEA

Santa Magalhães Airport (IATA: SET, ICAO: SNHS) is the airport serving Serra Talhada, Brazil.

It is operated by GRU Airport.

== History ==
Previously operated by Infracea, on May 16, 2022 the concessionary Dix started operating the facility.

On November 27, 2025 GRU Airport won the concession to operate the airport.

== Access ==
The airport is located 18 km (11 mi) from downtown Serra Talhada.

== See also ==
- List of airports in Brazil
