= Serra Talhada =

City in Pernambuco, Brazil

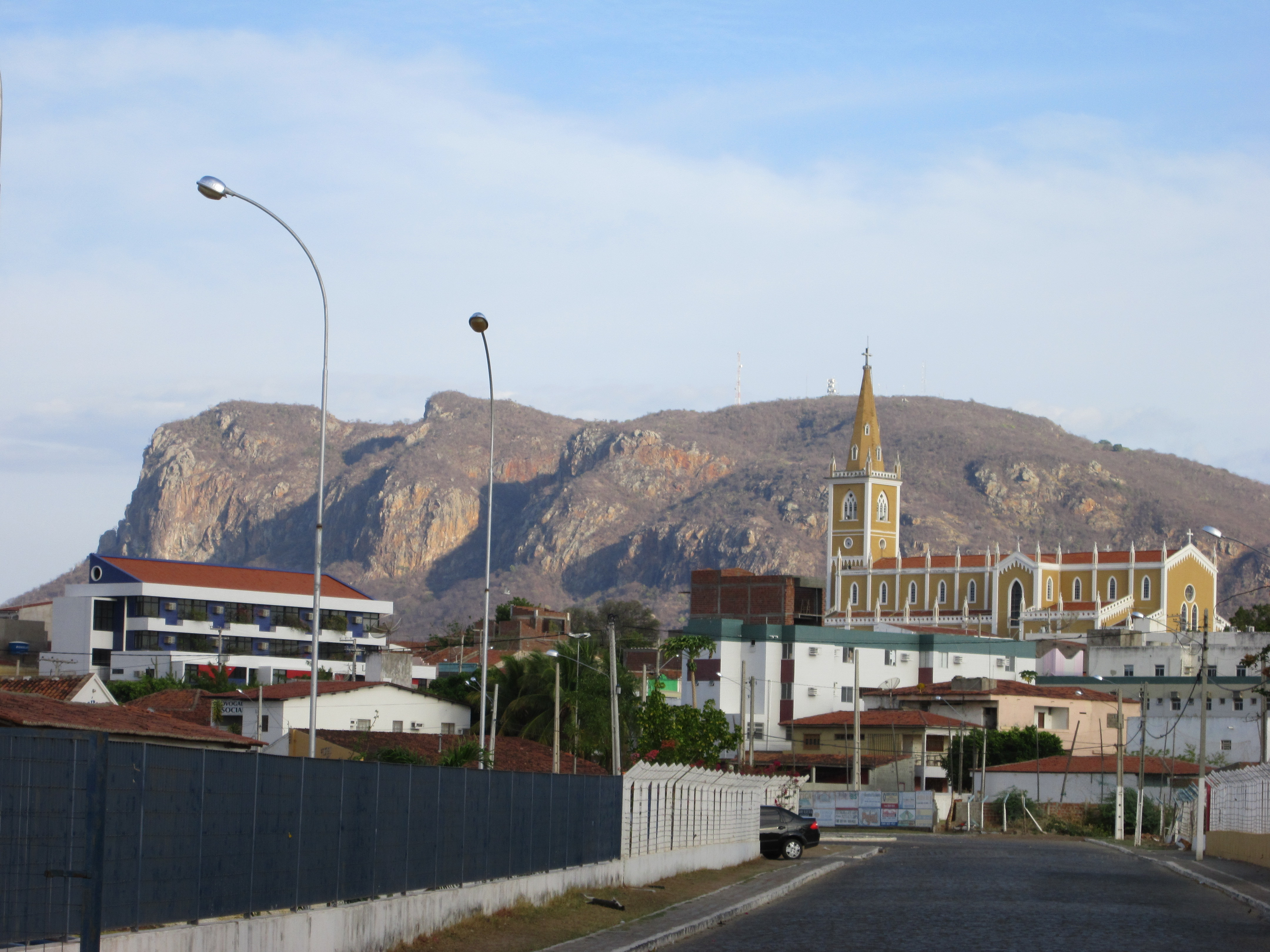
- General overview

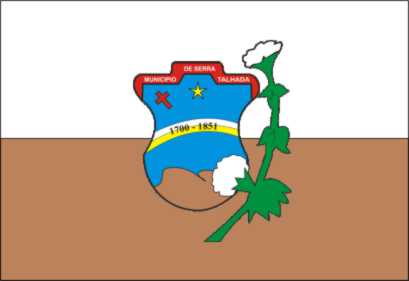
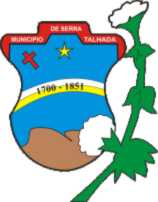
- Flag Coat of arms
- Interactive map of Serra Talhada
- Coordinates: 7°59′S 38°18′W
- Country: Brazil
- Region: Northeast
- Sub-region: Sertão
- State: Pernambuco

Area
  - Total: 2,980 km^{2} (1,150 sq mi)
- Elevation: 492 m (1,614 ft)

Population (2022 Census)
  - Total: 92,228
  - Estimate (2025): 98,816
- Time zone: UTC−3 (BRT)

Serra Talhada (Central northeastern portuguese pronunciation: [ˈsɛhɐ tɐˈʎadɐ] or [ˈsɛhɐ tɐjˈadɐ]) is a city in the state of Pernambuco, Brazil. It is located at 07º59'31" South and 38º17'54" West, at an altitude of 429 metres. As of 2025, its estimated population by IBGE was 98,816 people and its area is approximately 2980 km sq.

== History ==
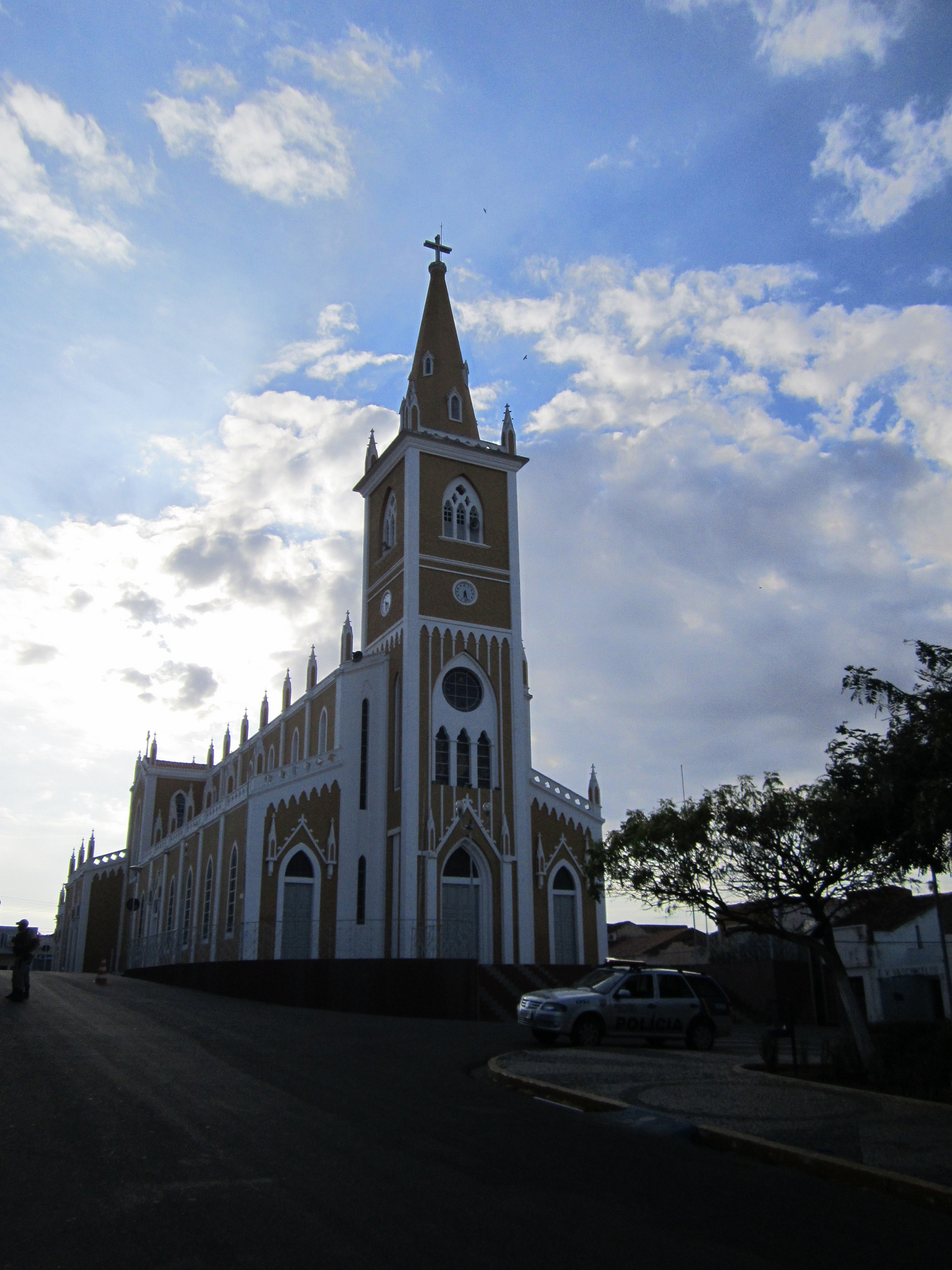
Our Lady of Penha Church

It used to be known as "Villa Bella" or "Beautiful Village". The name Serra Talhada means Chopped Hill; the city has a big hill that looks as if it had been chopped in half. The inhabitants of Serra Talhada have a dance called xaxado which used to be a dance performed by the Cangaceiros.

== Geography ==
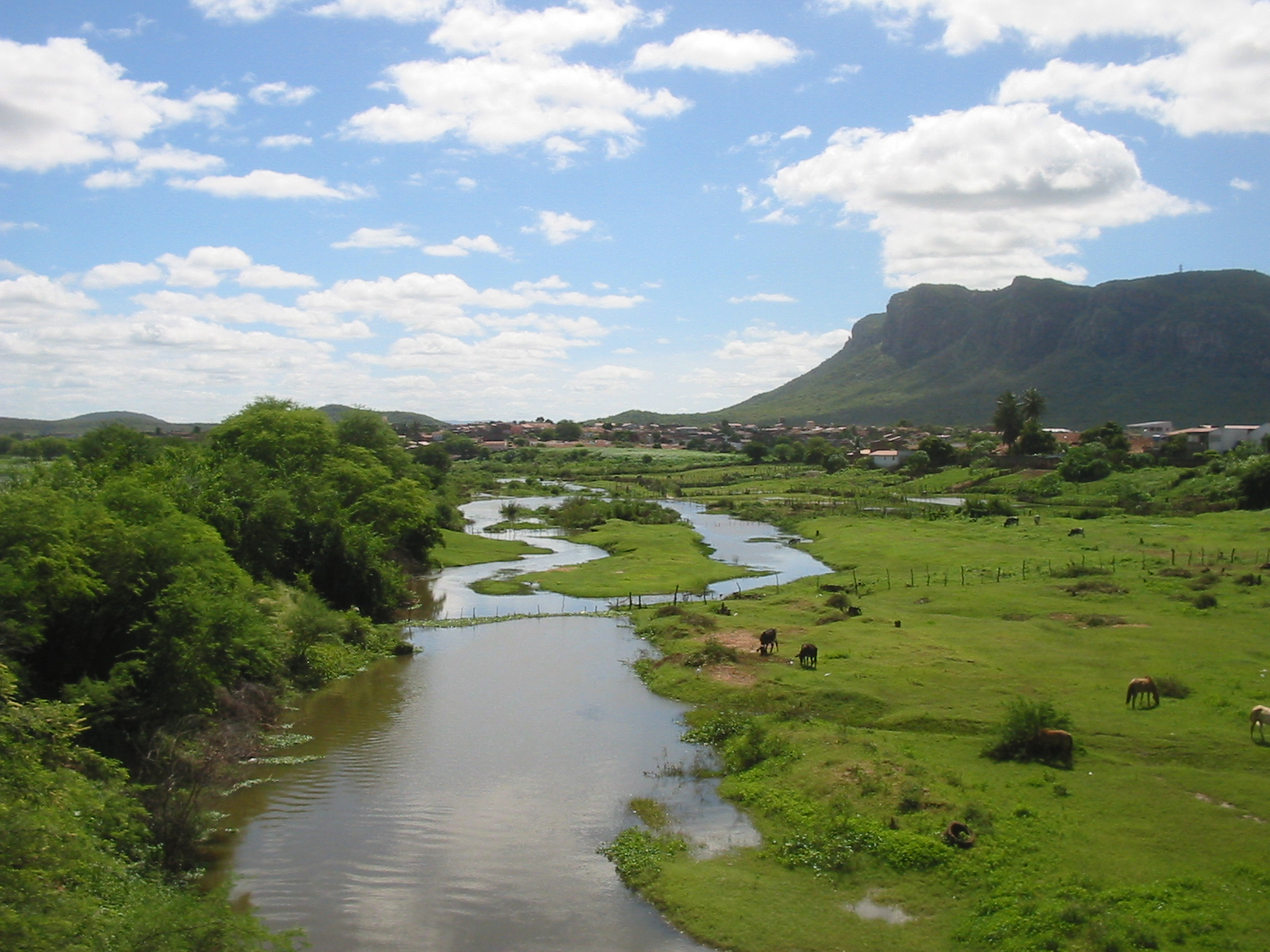
Pajeú River

- State - Pernambuco
- Region - Sertão of Pernambuco
- Boundaries - Floresta (S); Calumbi, Betânia and Santa Cruz da Baixa Verde (E); Mirandiba and São José do Belmonte (W); Paraíba state(N)
- Area - 2980 km^{2}
- Elevation - 429 m
- Hydrography - Pajeú River ¬¬)
- Vegetation - Caatinga hiperxerófila
- Climate - Hot semi-desertic
- Annual average temperature - 25.2 c
- Distance to Recife - 410.7 km

The municipality was designated a priority area for conservation and sustainable use when the Caatinga Ecological Corridor was created in 2006.

== Sports ==
There are two main football clubs in Serra Talhada, Ferroviário Esporte Clube and Serrano Futebol Clube. These two teams are rivals, playing the Serra Talhada derby.

The city's football stadium is the Estádio Nildo Pereira de Menezes, usually known by its nickname Pereirão, and it has a maximum capacity of 5,000 people.

== Economy ==
The main economic activities in Serra Talhada are general commerce and primary sector (employs 34%) especially corn and beans.

=== Economic Indicators ===
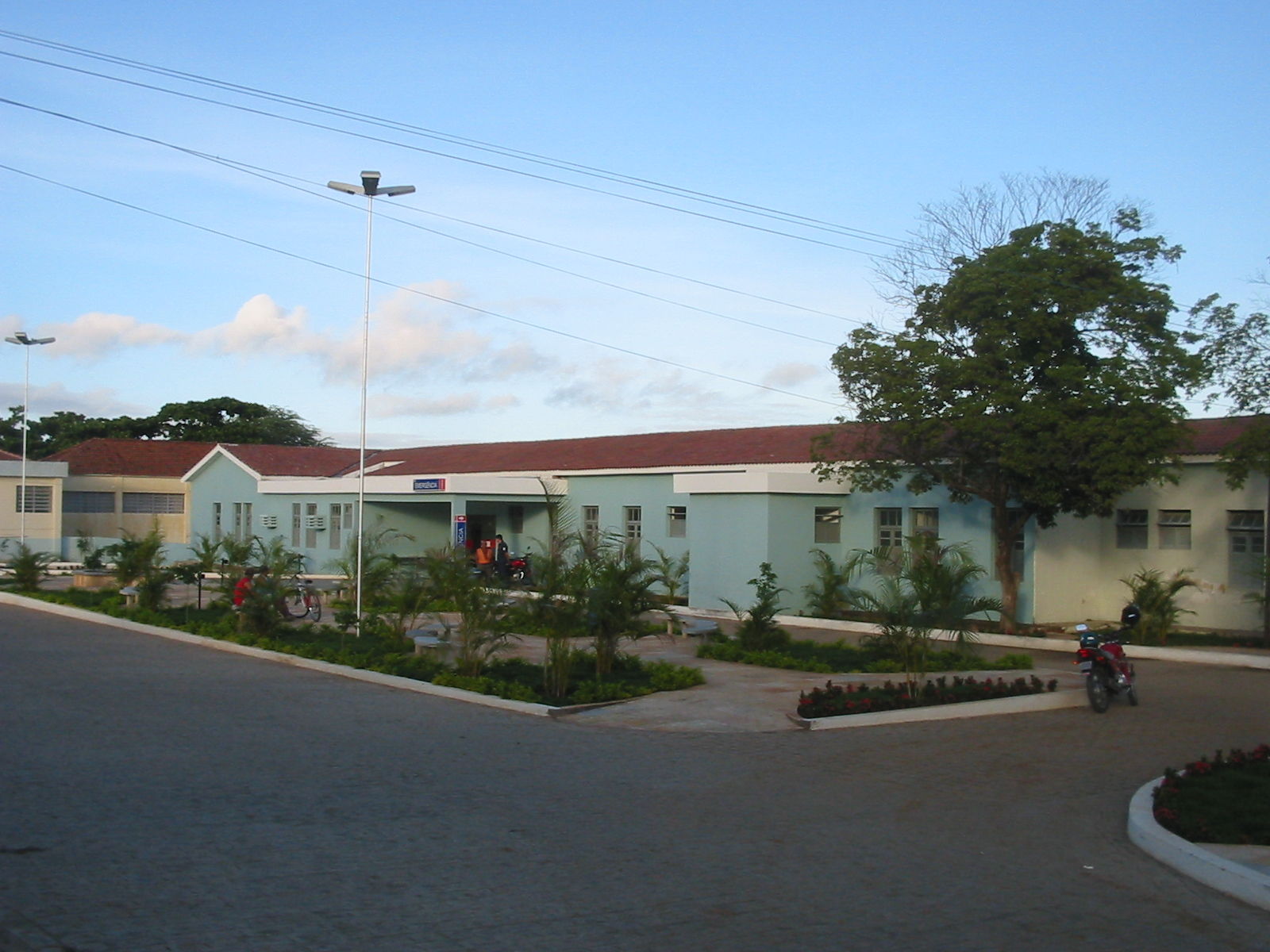
Hospital Professor Agamenon Magalhães (Hospam)

| Population | GDP x(1000 R$). | GDP pc (R$) | PE |
|---|---|---|---|
| 80.294 | 434.704 | 5.705 | 0.71% |

Economy by Sector 2006

| Primary sector | Secondary sector | Service sector |
|---|---|---|
| 6.57% | 11.52% | 81.91% |

=== Transportation ===
The city is served by Santa Magalhães Airport.

=== Health Indicators ===
| HDI (2000) | Hospitals (2007) | Hospitals beds (2007) | Children's Mortality every 1000 (2005) |
|---|---|---|---|
| 0.682 | 6 | 656 | 28.9 |

== See also ==
- List of municipalities in Pernambuco
