= Triunfo, Pernambuco =

Municipality of Pernambuco, Brazil

Triunfo
- Municipality
- Municipality of Triunfo
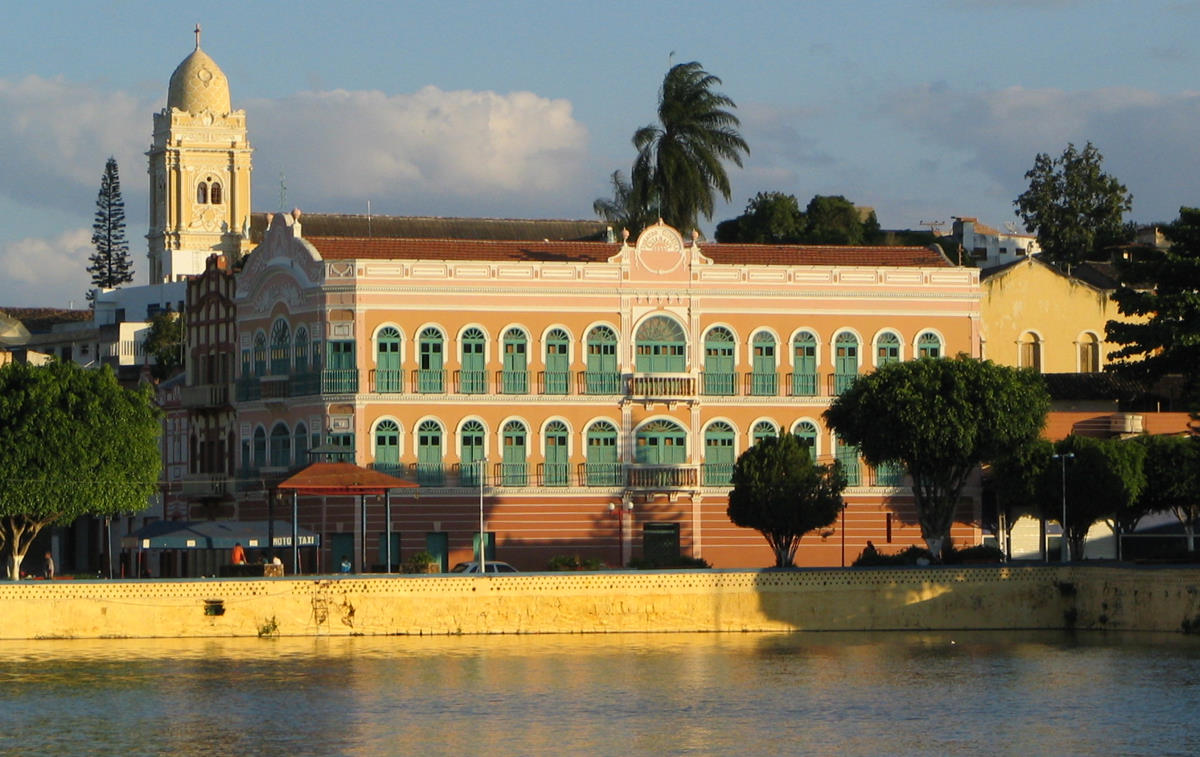

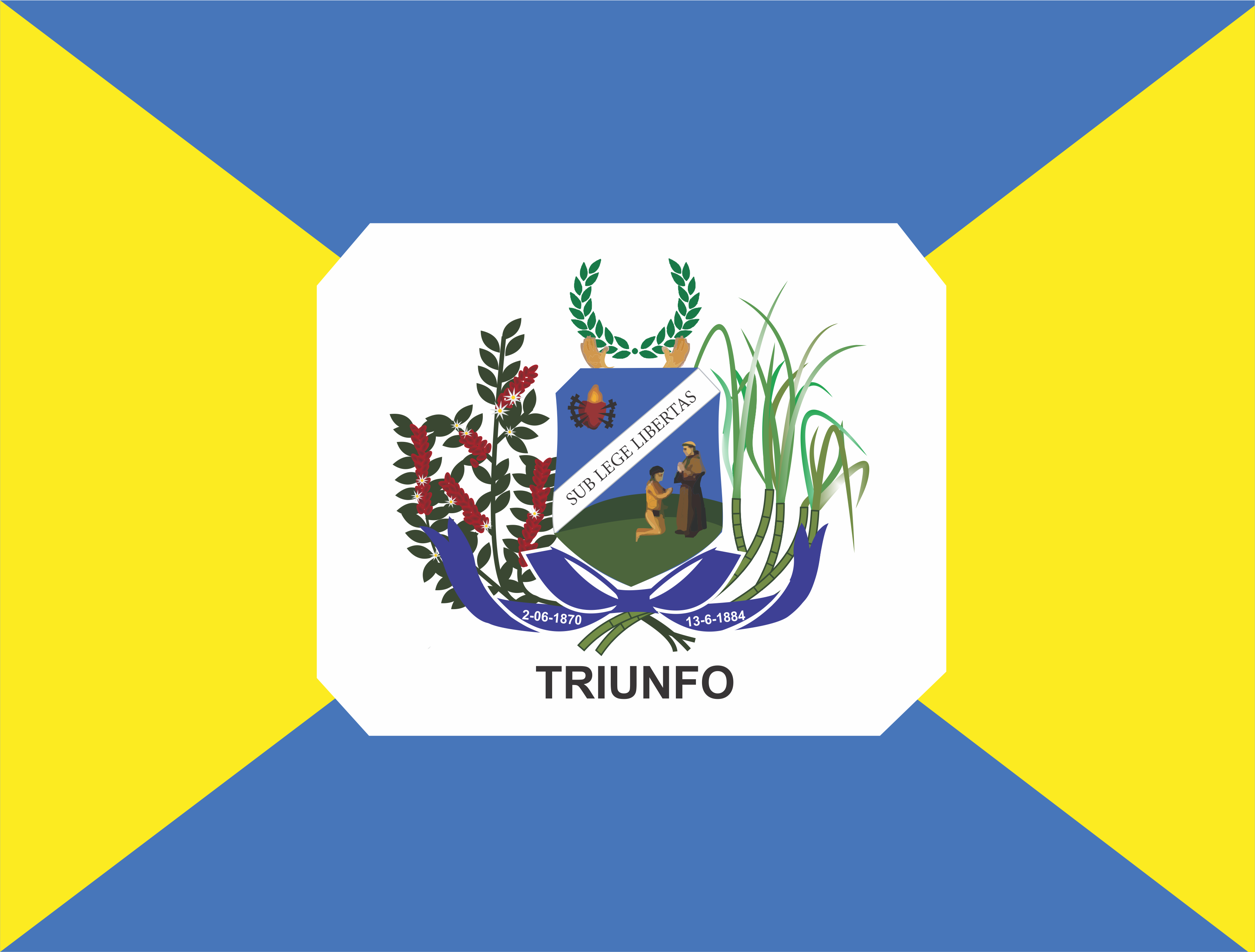
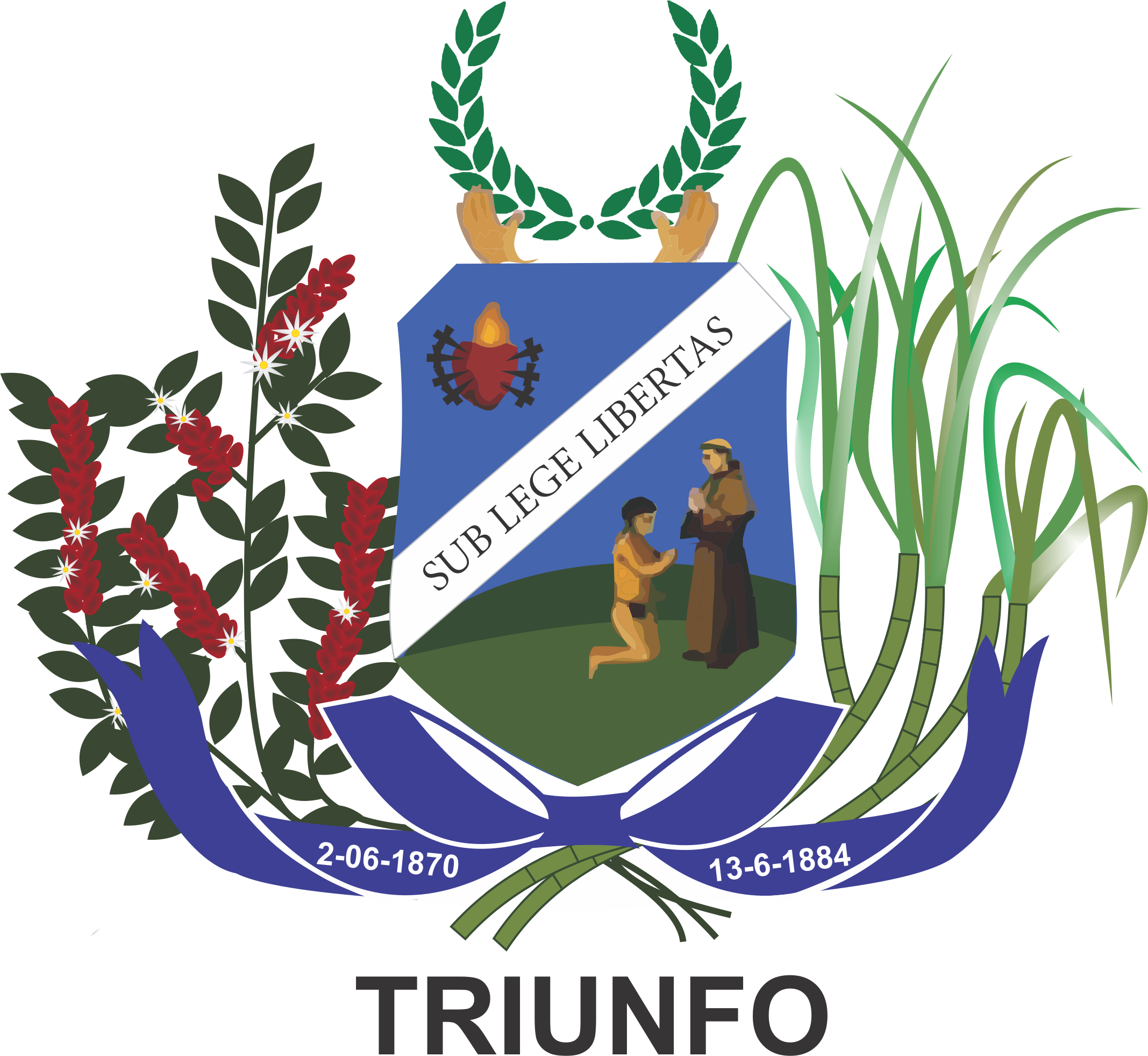
- Flag Coat of arms
- Nickname: Oasis do Sertão ('Oasis of the Sertão')
- Motto: Sub lege libertas ('Liberty under the law')
- Location in Pernambuco

- Location in Brazil
- Coordinates: 7.83777°S 38.10194°W
- Country: Brazil
- Region: Northeast
- State: Pernambuco

Government
  - Mayor: Luciano Bonfim (Avante)

Area
  - Total: 191.52 km^{2} (73.95 sq mi)

Population
  - Total: 14,705
  - Estimate (2025): 15,141
  - Density: 76.780/km^{2} (198.86/sq mi)
- Demonym: triunfense
- Time zone: UTC−3 (BRT)
- HDI (2010): 0.670 – medium

Triunfo (Central northeastern portuguese pronunciation: [tɾiˈũfŭ]) is a municipality in the Northeastern Brazilian state of Pernambuco. The estimated population in 2020, according to the Brazilian Institute of Geography and Statistics (IBGE) was 15,243. The area of the municipality is 191.52 km^{2}, and in 2010 the population density was 78 inhabitants/km^{2}. Triunfo sits at an elevation of 1,004 metres (3,294 ft) in a forested part of the Sertão, and is the highest municipality in Pernambuco.

Far inland and with a milder climate than the surrounding semi-arid plateau, the city has the nickname "Oasis of the Sertão", and tourism is a significant part of the economy. Its current mayor is Luciano Fernando de Sousa (better known as Luciano Bonfim) of the Avante party, elected in 2020.

== Geography ==
- Region – Sertão of Pernambuco
- Boundaries – state of Paraíba (N); Calumbi (S); Flores (E); Santa Cruz da Baixa Verde (W)
- Area – 191.52 km^{2}
- Elevation – 1004 m
- Drainage basin – Pajeú River
- Vegetation – Semi-deciduous forest
- Climate – Tropical wet and dry (Köppen Aw)
- Annual average temperature – 20.4 °C
- Distance to Recife – 403 km

=== Climate ===
Climate data for Triunfo, Pernambuco, 1981-2010 normals, extremes 1961-2010
Month	Jan	Feb	Mar	Apr	May	Jun	Jul	Aug	Sep	Oct	Nov	Dec	Year
Record high °C (°F)	33.3 (91.9)	33.1 (91.6)	32.5 (90.5)	31.9 (89.4)	31.4 (88.5)	32.4 (90.3)	29.1 (84.4)	31.0 (87.8)	32.5 (90.5)	33.2 (91.8)	32.9 (91.2)	33.3 (91.9)	33.3 (91.9)
Mean daily maximum °C (°F)	28.4 (83.1)	27.5 (81.5)	27.0 (80.6)	26.0 (78.8)	25.1 (77.2)	23.4 (74.1)	23.5 (74.3)	24.8 (76.6)	27.4 (81.3)	29.4 (84.9)	29.7 (85.5)	29.3 (84.7)	26.8 (80.2)
Daily mean °C (°F)	22.9 (73.2)	22.3 (72.1)	22.0 (71.6)	21.5 (70.7)	20.7 (69.3)	19.0 (66.2)	18.6 (65.5)	19.1 (66.4)	21.0 (69.8)	22.9 (73.2)	23.5 (74.3)	23.4 (74.1)	21.4 (70.5)
Mean daily minimum °C (°F)	18.4 (65.1)	18.3 (64.9)	18.5 (65.3)	18.2 (64.8)	17.5 (63.5)	16.3 (61.3)	15.5 (59.9)	15.4 (59.7)	15.9 (60.6)	16.9 (62.4)	17.6 (63.7)	18.0 (64.4)	17.2 (63.0)
Record low °C (°F)	11.3 (52.3)	12.0 (53.6)	13.4 (56.1)	14.2 (57.6)	11.0 (51.8)	11.3 (52.3)	11.4 (52.5)	11.9 (53.4)	11.6 (52.9)	10.6 (51.1)	6.8 (44.2)	14.2 (57.6)	6.8 (44.2)
Average precipitation mm (inches)	135.8 (5.35)	164.4 (6.47)	193.8 (7.63)	193.3 (7.61)	130.1 (5.12)	127.2 (5.01)	107.8 (4.24)	65.6 (2.58)	20.9 (0.82)	25.3 (1.00)	25.3 (1.00)	54.9 (2.16)	1,244.4 (48.99)
Average precipitation days (≥ 1 mm)	9	10	14	13	11	12	11	8	3	2	3	4	100
Average relative humidity (%)	66.7	72.2	77.7	79.8	81.5	85.1	82.3	76.0	63.7	56.3	56.0	59.2	71.4
Mean monthly sunshine hours	227.9	201.6	223.3	217.5	205.2	175.4	200.9	232.2	266.8	285.7	273.1	259.8	2,769.4
Percentage possible sunshine	59	59	60	61	57	51	56	64	74	76	74	67	63
Source: INMET

== Economy ==
The main economic activities in Triunfo are tourism, commerce and agribusiness, especially farming of goats, cattle, sheep; and plantations of guavas and sugarcane.

=== Economic indicators ===
Population	GDP (in thousands of Brazilian Reais (R$)) (2007)	GDP per capita (R$)	Percent of Pernambuco GDP
15.770	45.932	3.017	0.077%

Economy by sector 2006

Primary sector	Secondary sector	Service sector
11.10%	9.93%	78.97%

=== Health indicators ===
HDI (2010)	Hospitals (2010)	Hospitals beds (2010)	Infant mortality rate per 1000 live births (2013)
0.670	1	13	21.62

== See also ==
- List of municipalities in Pernambuco
