= Carnaíba =

Municipality of Pernambuco, Brazil

- Municipality of Pernambuco, Brazil
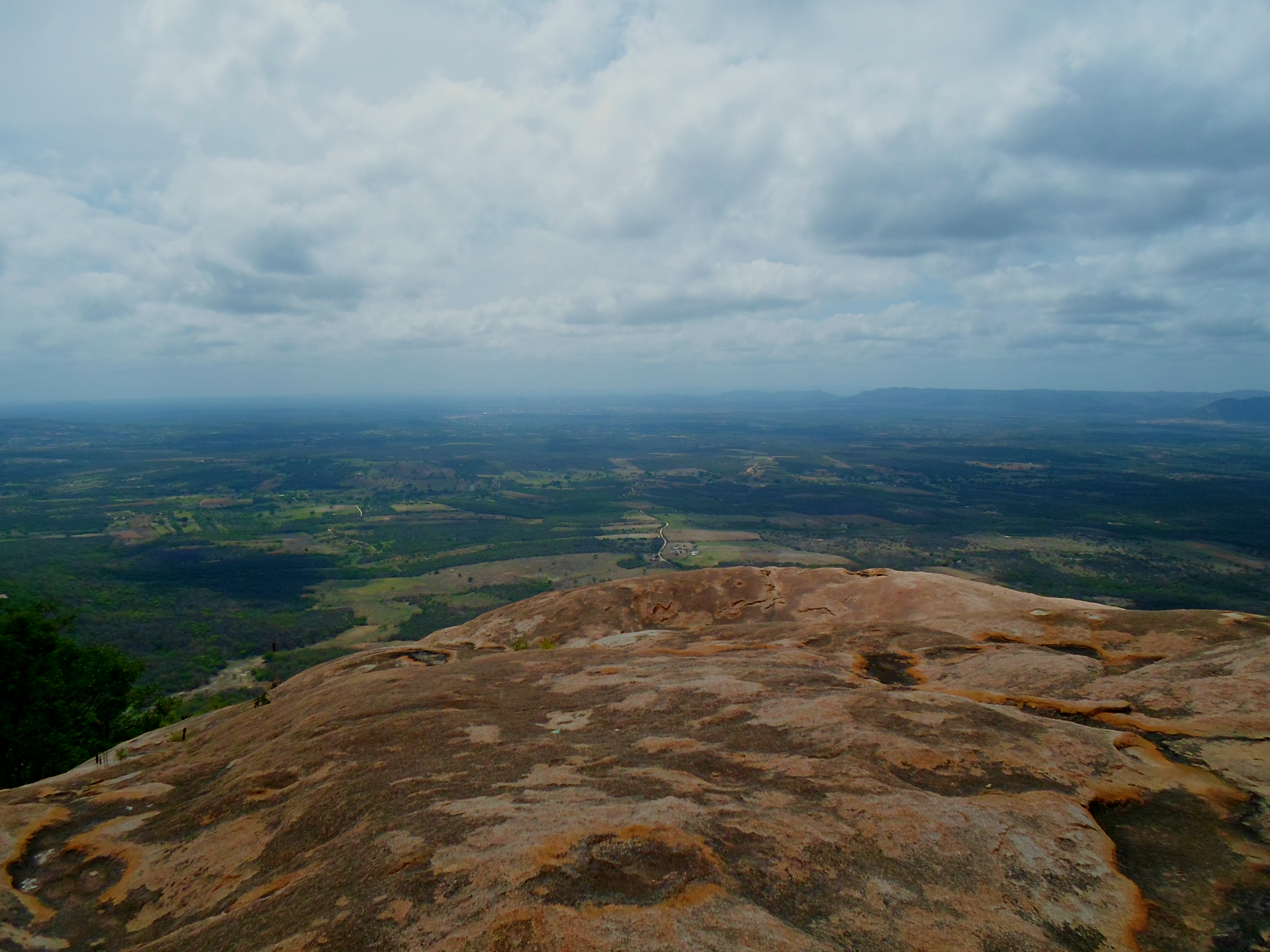
- Serra da Matinha in Carnaíba

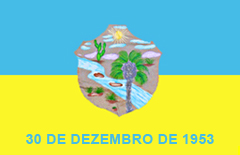
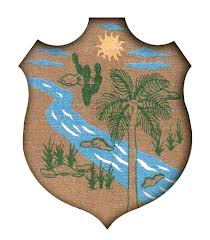
- Flag Coat of arms
- Etymology: Originated from the name of the Carnauba tree, which is abundant in the area
- Location of Carnaíba in Pernambuco

- Location within Brazil Location within South America
- Coordinates: 7°48′18″S 37°47′38″W
- Country: Brazil
- Region: Northeast
- State: Pernambuco
- Founded: 30 December 1953

Government
  - Mayor: Wamberg Antonio Gomes Amaral (PSB) (2025-2028)
  - Vice Mayor: Cicero Batista Lima (MDB) (2025-2028)

Area
  - Total: 432.137 km^{2} (166.849 sq mi)
- Elevation: 485 m (1,591 ft)

Population (2022 Census)
  - Total: 18,644
  - Estimate (2025): 19,533
  - Density: 43.58/km^{2} (112.9/sq mi)
- Demonym: Carnaibano (Brazilian Portuguese)
- Time zone: UTC-03:00 (Brasília Time)
- Postal code: 56820-000, 56825-000
- HDI (2010): 0.583 – medium
- Website: carnaiba.pe.gov.br

Carnaíba (Central northeastern portuguese pronunciation: [kɐɦnɐˈiˑba]) is a city in the state of Pernambuco, Brazil. The population in 2025, according with IBGE was 19,533 inhabitants and the total area is 432.13 km^{2}. Its mayor is Wamberg Gomes.

== Geography ==
- State - Pernambuco
- Region - Sertão Pernambucano
- Boundaries - Solidão and Paraíba state (N); Custódia (S); Afogados da Ingazeira (E); Flores and Quixaba (E)
- Area - 436.98 km^{2}
- Elevation - 485 m
- Hydrography - Pajeú River
- Vegetation - Caatinga Hiperxerófila
- Climate - Semi arid- hot
- Annual average temperature - 24.4 c
- Distance to Recife - 395 km

== Economy ==
The main economic activities in Carnaíba are based in commerce and agribusiness, especially creation of cattle, goats, sheep, pigs, chickens; and plantations of corn, beans, manioc, and cashew nuts.

=== Economic Indicators ===
Population	GDP x(1000 R$).	GDP pc (R$)	PE
19.155	52.018	2.836	0.085%

Economy by Sector 2006

Primary sector	Secondary sector	Service sector
14.43%	8.68%	76.89%

=== Schools ===
According to some people, schools have their special room for autistic people where they play games.

=== Health Indicators ===
HDI (2000)	Hospitals (2007)	Hospitals beds (2007)	Children's Mortality every 1000 (2005)
0.583	1	15	27.9
