= Carne-seca =

Brazilian dried meat

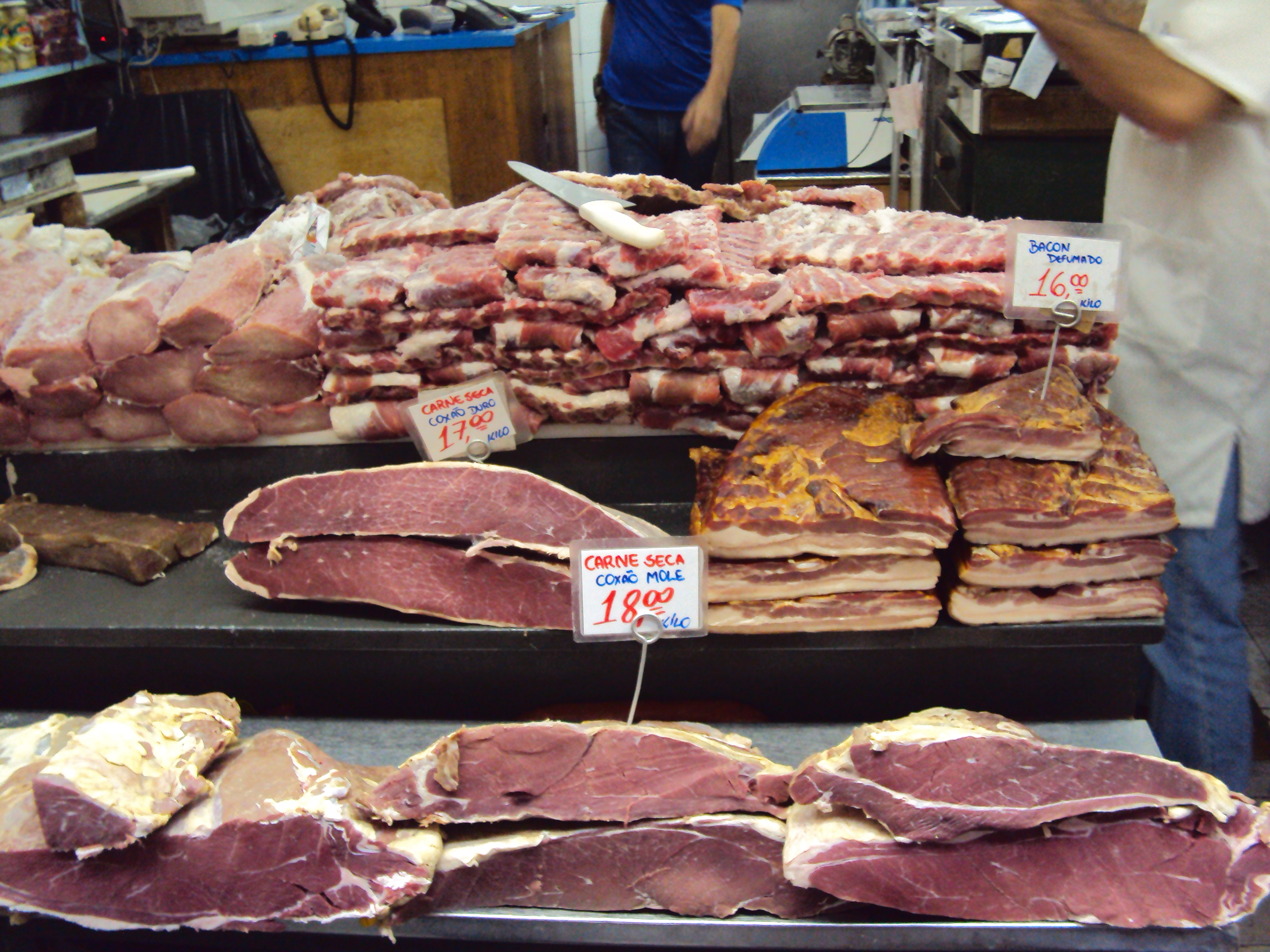
Carne seca

Carne-seca ('dried meat' in Portuguese) is a kind of dried, salted meat, usually beef, in Brazilian cuisine.

Carne seca is a frequent accompaniment to black beans.

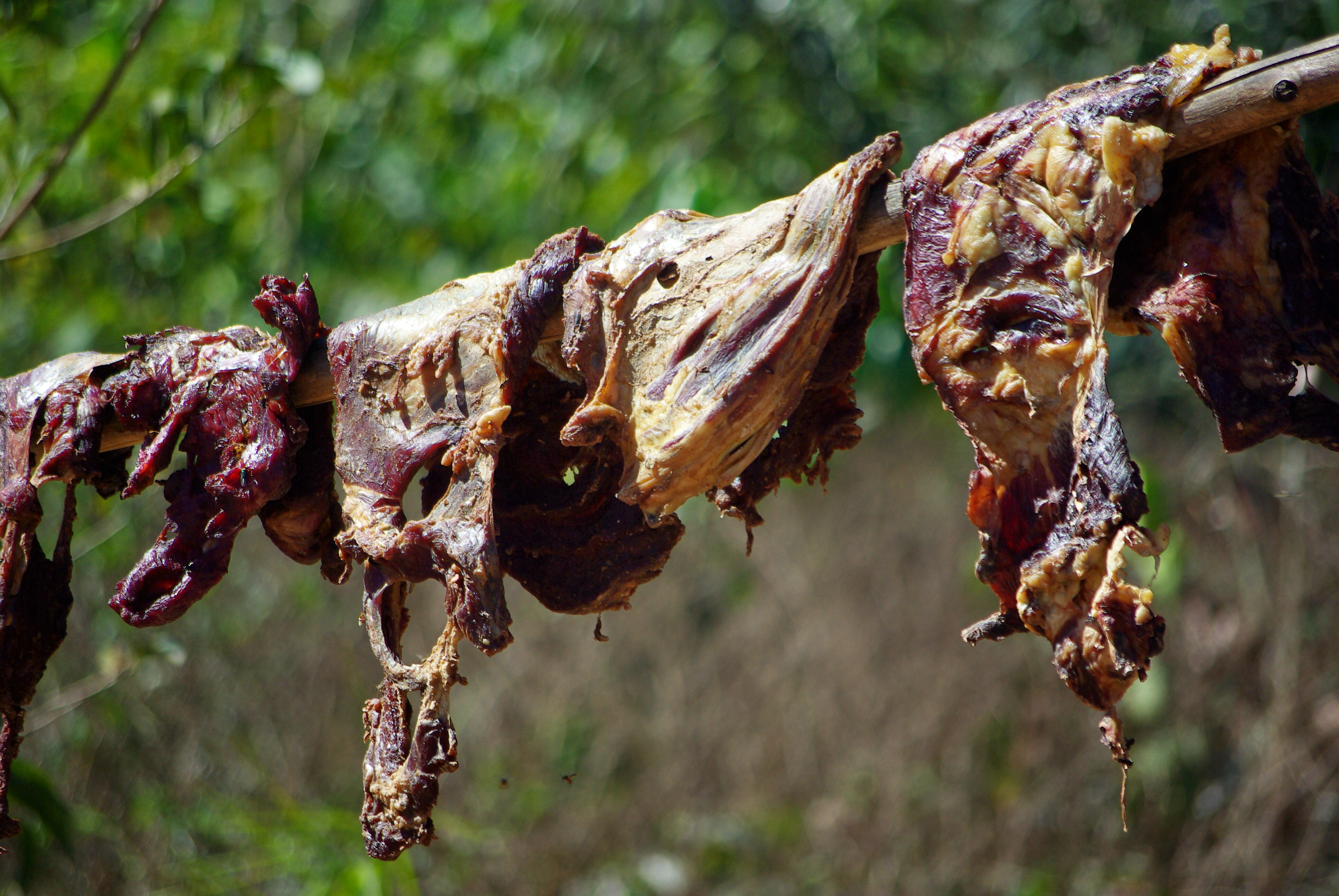
Carne-seca in Maranhão

== See also ==
- List of dried foods
