= Sertão =

Sub-region in the Northeast Region of Brazil

Sertão Brasileiro
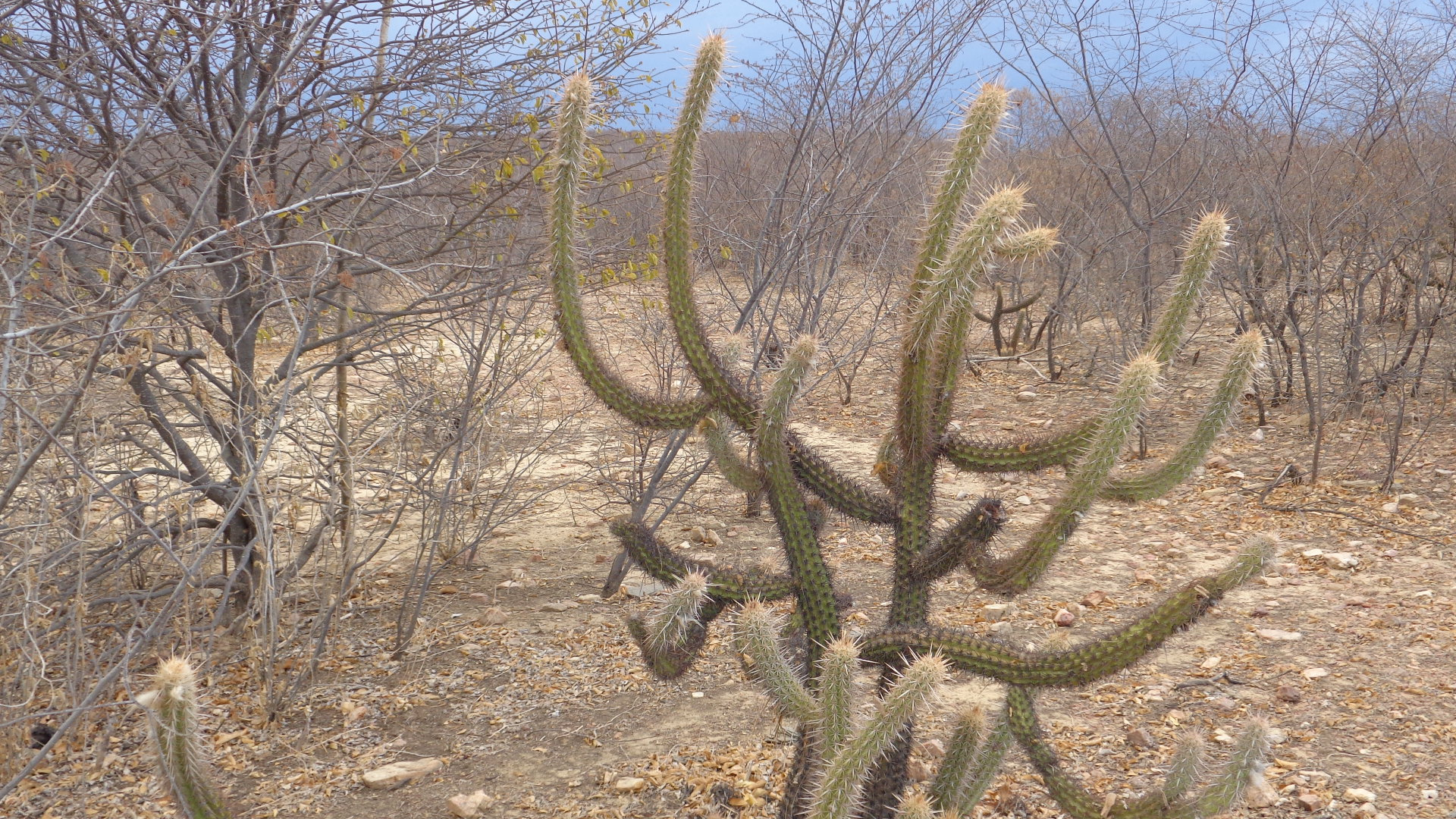

- The Subregions of Northeast Brazil; 1 • Meio-norte, 2 • Sertão, 3 • Agreste, 4 • Zona da Mata

The sertão (Portuguese pronunciation: [seʁˈtɐ̃w], plural sertões) is the "hinterland" or "backcountry" of Brazil. The word refers both to one of the four sub-regions of the Northeast Region of Brazil or the hinterlands of the country in general (similar to the specific association of "outback" with Australia in English). Northeast Brazil is largely covered in a scrubby upland forest called caatingas, from the Tupi language, meaning white forest. Leaves fall during dry season and most of the vegetation, mainly bushes and small trees, is reduced to bare branches and trunks in characteristic pale grayish, or off-white, hues. The regional borders are not precise. Due to lengthy and unpredictable droughts, the region is economically poor but it is well known in Brazilian culture for its rich history and folklore.

The sertão is described fully within Os Sertões (The Backlands), a notable book written by Brazilian author Euclides da Cunha.

Originally Portuguese explorers used the term for the vast hinterlands of Asia and South America that they encountered. In Brazil, sertao referred to backlands away from those Atlantic coastal regions where the Portuguese first settled in the early sixteenth century. A Brazilian historian once referred to colonial life in Brazil as a "civilization of crabs", as most settlers clung to the shoreline, with few trying to make inroads into the sertão.

In modern terms, sertão refers more specifically to a semi-arid region in northeastern Brazil, comprising parts of the states of Alagoas, Bahia, Pernambuco, Paraíba, Rio Grande do Norte, Ceará, Maranhão, Piauí, Sergipe, and Minas Gerais.

Geographically, the sertão consists mainly of low uplands that form part of the Brazilian Highlands. Most parts of the sertão are between 200 meters (660 ft) and 500 meters (1,600 ft) above sea level, with higher elevations found on the eastern edge in the Borborema Plateau, where it merges into a sub-humid region known as agreste, in the Serra da Ibiapaba in western Ceará and in the Serro do Periquito of central Pernambuco. In the north, the sertão extends to the northern coastal plains of Rio Grande do Norte state, while to the south it ends gradually in the northern part of Minas Gerais.

Two major rivers cross the sertão, the Jaguaribe and further east the Piranhas. To the south, the larger São Francisco River flows in part in the sertão. Smaller rivers dry up at the end of the rainy season.

The term sertão is also used in Portuguese to refer to the Brazilian hinterland in general, regardless of region. It is this sense that corresponds to sertão music, música sertaneja, roughly "country music". To avoid ambiguity, the region in the northeast is sometimes called the sertão nordestino, while the Brazilian hinterland may also be called the sertânia, the land of sertões.

== Etymology ==
There are a number of hypotheses about the origin of the word Sertão, most of which place its appearance during the colonization of Brazil by the Portuguese. The most widespread of these holds that, when they left the Brazilian coast and moved inland, the Lusitanian settlers noticed a big difference in the climate of this semi-arid region and referred to it as "desertão" (big desert), due to its hot, dry climate. Therefore, this name would have been understood as "de sertão" (of the sertão), leaving only the word Sertão.

The hypothesis of a corruption of "desertão" is challenged on the basis of phonetics, which reaffirms the impossibility of sertão being a corruption of the Latin desertanu due to the inversion that this path would mean from the point of view of the law of least effort, implying a sonorization of the occlusive as opposed to deafening, which would be the most natural progression.

Gustavo Barroso, a Brazilian Academy of Letters alumni, also rejected this hypothesis and argued that the origin of the word was in the term muchitum, from the Mbunda language of Angola, which means "place in the interior". The term would have been adopted by the Portuguese colonizers in the form of "mulcetão", later reduced to "celtão" and "certão", and then spread throughout the Lusitanian overseas empire during the first centuries of its expansion.

It is also possible that, on the contrary, the Angolan term arose from contact with the Portuguese, given that the town of Sertã, in Portuguese lands, dates back to long before the time of the great navigations. According to local legend, the town was founded in 74 BC by the Roman general Quintus Sertorius under the name "Sertaga", corrupted to "Sartão". On one occasion when enemy troops attacked the settlement, a woman defended herself from the soldiers with a large sertãa, a square frying pan, saving the village. The popularization of the legend and its phonetic similarity to the name of the place would have meant that this word was also used, by extension, to characterize the surroundings of this settlement, one of the most inland lands in the continental Portuguese territory, and later became a synonym for inland lands throughout the nascent Portuguese empire.

== History ==
In the first century of colonization, while the focus of Portuguese colonization was the northeastern Zona da Mata, where there was the extraction of brazilwood and, later, the sugar cycle, the northeastern Sertão was an unknown land, explored only by backwoodsmen hoping to find precious metals. Notable among these was the expedition of Belchior Dias Moreia, grandson of the castaway Caramuru, who explored the backlands of Bahia and Sergipe in the late 16th century and early 17th century.

Cattle were introduced into the northeastern Zona da Mata during the administration of the first governor-general of Brazil, Tomé de Sousa, and oxen were used as draft animals for the sugarcane fields and as food. Over the decades, cattle herds multiplied and began to cause problems for the sugar plantations. This factor, combined with the Dutch invasions of Brazil, during which many plantation pastures were destroyed and many opponents of Dutch rule had to seek refuge in the interior, and the social rigidity of the sugar cycle, which required only a small number of free workers, led whites, mamelucos, mulattoes and blacks from the coastal centers of Bahia and Pernambuco to move into the Caatinga along with the cattle, as cowboys and assistants. The conquest of Sergipe in 1590 allowed Bahian cattle breeders to reach and settle the right bank of the São Francisco River with corrals.

After the expulsion of the Dutch, there was a major advance in the colonization of the northeastern Sertão. Bahian cattle breeders and their descendants crossed the São Francisco River and settled the hinterlands of Pernambuco, Piauí, the western Bahia region and the southern half of Ceará, while cattle breeders from Pernambuco and their descendants colonized the region of the Borborema Plateau, the Paraíba backlands, the interior of Rio Grande do Norte and the northern half of Ceará. The Paulistas also participated in the colonization of the northeastern caatingas: the historian Capistrano de Abreu stated that many Paulistas who fought against quilombos and Indigenous revolts in the interior of the Northeast never returned to São Paulo and settled in the regions they conquered as farmers.

Although dispersed throughout the Sertão and part of the Agreste, cattle ranching was responsible for populating these regions, following the courses of rivers such as the São Francisco, Jaguaribe, Piranhas–Açu, Apodi, Parnaíba, Itapicuru and Vaza-Barris, along whose banks ranches were concentrated, making it an important factor in the interiorization of Brazil's settlement.

The cowboys of the Sertão continuously mixed with local Indigenous peoples, but there was also strong hostility between them, as in the War of the Barbarians (1687–1720), which occurred between colonists and Amerindians in the backlands of Paraíba, Rio Grande do Norte and Ceará.

In the Caatinga, a population developed that had to adapt to the dry and isolated environment. During rainy periods, the sertanejos planted crops such as maize, cassava and beans, and produced milk and cheese. In addition, leather was always present in the life of the sertanejo, and Capistrano de Abreu described the simple lifestyle dependent on this material as a "civilization of leather". Abreu stated the following about this material, so essential to these people:

[...] De couro era a porta das cabanas, o rude leito aplicado ao chão duro, e mais tarde a cama para os partos; de couro eram todas as cordas, a borracha para carregar água, o mocó ou alforje para levar comida, a maca para guardar roupa, a mochila para milhar cavalo, a peia para prendê-lo em viagem, as bainhas de faca, as bruacas e surrões, a roupa de entrar no mato, os banguês para curtume ou para apurar sal; para os açudes, o material de aterro era levado em couros puxados por juntas de bois que calcavam a terra com seu peso. Em couro o sertanejo pisa o tabaco para o nariz.

— ABREU, Capistrano de (1998). Capítulos de história colonial: 1500-1800 (PDF). Brasília: Conselho Editorial do Senado Federal. p. 135.

The sertão ranches, whose owners largely lived on the coast, were cared for by cowboys, who kept a portion of the cattle as payment, usually a quarter of the total herd after five years of service. The labor used in northeastern cattle ranching was predominantly free, although some regions, such as Piauí, made large-scale use of enslaved Africans in this economic activity.

With the discovery of gold in Minas Gerais, sertão cattle ranches began supplying food to the gold mines.

In the late 17th century and early 18th century, Bandeirantes from São Paulo discovered gold deposits in the region of Jacobina and in the headwaters of the Paramirim, de Contas and Brumado rivers, which brought to these zones explorers from Portugal, Bahia, São Paulo and Minas Gerais, as well as enslaved Africans to work in the mines.

In the 18th and 19th centuries, an economic activity of the Sertão associated with cattle raising was the cultivation of mocó cotton, native to the region and whose fibers had broad international acceptance, using free labor.

In the 1840s, diamond deposits were discovered in present-day Mucugê, Lençóis and Andaraí, which brought explorers from other parts of Brazil to this part of the Chapada Diamantina, largely former miners from Northern Minas Gerais and the southwestern Bahia region and merchants from Salvador and the Recôncavo Baiano, as well as enslaved people.

Between 1877 and 1879, the Sertão was affected by the most severe drought in its history, the Great Drought, whose most affected region was Ceará.

In the second half of the 20th century, irrigated agriculture developed in the São Francisco Valley, especially fruit cultivation. More recently, the agricultural frontier expanded into the region known as MATOPIBA, with crops such as soybean, maize and cotton and cattle raising, which has generated extensive deforestation and the displacement of traditional communities in this region.

== Geography ==
=== Climate and vegetation ===
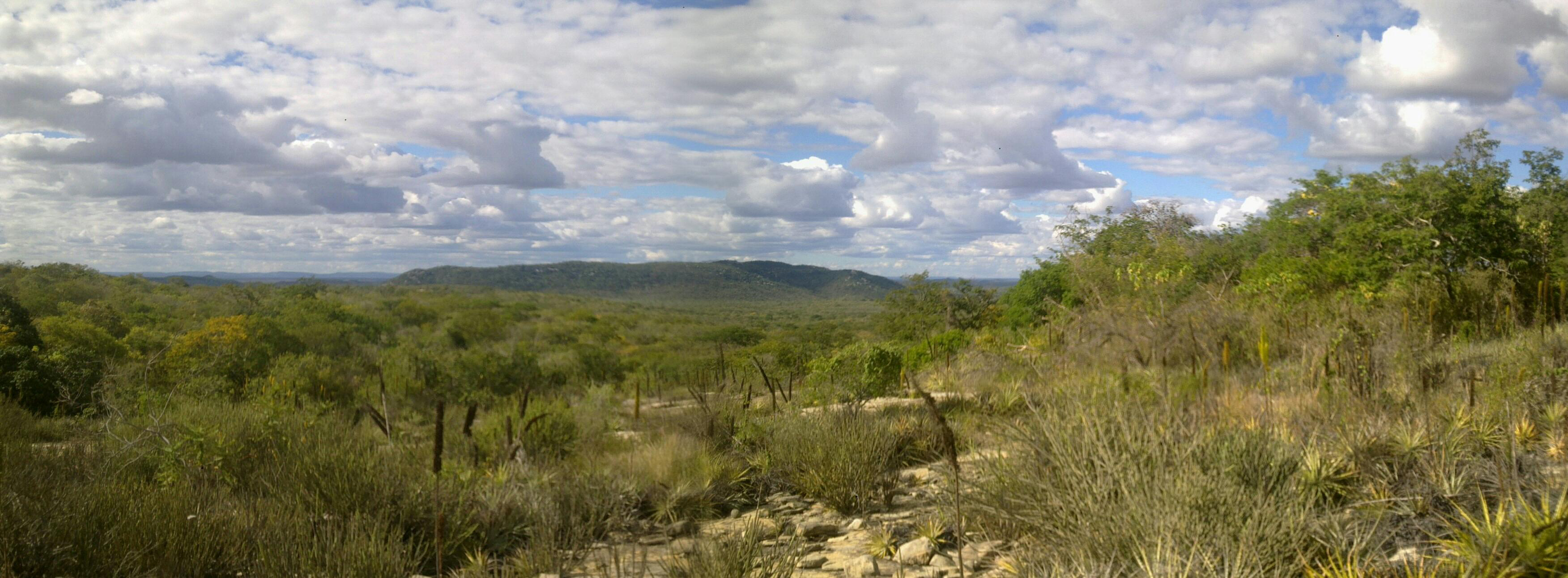
Steppe savanna, called Caatinga in Brazil, the predominant vegetation of the Sertão and also present in part of the Agreste

The predominant climate in the northeastern Sertão is semi-arid tropical, characterized by an average annual temperature between 25 and 30°C (reaching 42°C in south-central Piauí and in the Raso da Catarina) and average annual rainfall between 400 and 700 mm, in some places reaching 300 mm per year or even less, and in others more than 1,000 mm annually. Rainfall is irregular and concentrated in three to five months of the year - a period known as "winter" - in the first half of the year.

The regions of the Bahian Serra do Espinhaço (including the Chapada Diamantina), Chapada do Araripe, Serra da Ibiapaba, Maciço de Baturité and the mountain ranges of the Triunfo region have greater humidity than the rest of the Sertão.

In the West Bahia region, the predominant climate is semi-humid tropical, characterized by greater regularity and by having two well-defined seasons: a humid summer and a dry winter.

The Sertão is the subregion with the lowest rainfall index in the entire country. The scarcity and irregular distribution of rainfall in this area are due, above all, to the dynamics of air masses and also to the influence of relief.

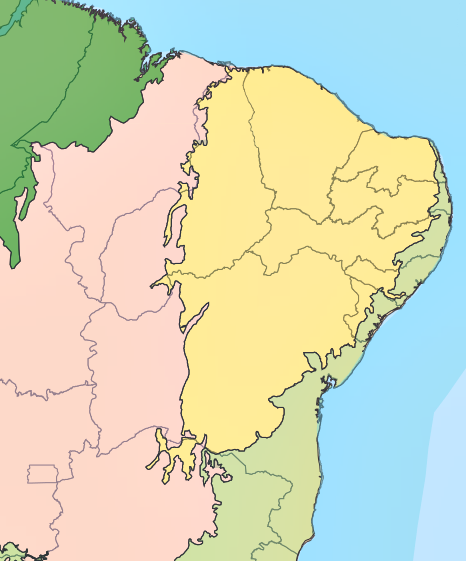
Biomes of the Northeast Amazon Cerrado Caatinga Atlantic Forest Coastal Marine

The occurrence of droughts is directly related to the phenomenon of warming of the waters of the Pacific Ocean, near the western coast of South America, known as El Niño. This warming of the Pacific occurs at irregular intervals of three to seven years, interfering with the circulation of winds on a global scale and, consequently, with the distribution of rainfall in the northeastern Sertão. They cause major losses to rural landowners, who lose their crops and livestock, and to the population in general, which suffers from the lack of food and drinking water in this subregion of the Northeast. The area affected by drought is equivalent to three times the state of São Paulo. Sporadic rains and emergency aid cannot obscure the need to create effective alternatives to combat the problem. One alternative to guarantee water during drought in the rural area is the use of cisterns, with a capacity of 15,000 liters, costing about R$ 1,800 and able to supply a family of five for seven to eight months of drought.

==== Drought Polygon ====
For the purpose of facilitating actions to combat droughts and mitigate their effects on the Sertão population, the federal government delimited in 1951 (Note: After Lei nº 4 239, of 27 July 1963, it was established that any municipality created by the division of the area of a municipality included in the Drought Polygon would be considered as belonging to it for all legal and administrative purposes. On the other hand, Lei nº 4.763, of 30 August 1965, included the municipality of Vitória da Conquista. Finally, Decree-Law nº 63 778, of 11 December 1968, delegated to the Superintendent of SUDENE the authority to declare, in accordance with the specific legislation, which municipalities belonged to the Drought Polygon. This Decree-Law regulated and clarified that the inclusion of municipalities in the Polygon would occur only for those created by the division of municipalities previously included totally or partially in the same Polygon, when such divisions had been made up to the date of the regulatory law, that is, 30 August 1965. On 19 December 1997, the Deliberative Council of SUDENE, through Resolution nº 11 135, approved the updated list of municipalities belonging to the Drought Polygon, including those created by dismemberment up to January 1997.) the so-called Drought Polygon.

Initially, the Polygon covered about 950,000 square kilometres, extending across the areas of semi-arid climate.

==== Caatinga ====
The typical and predominant vegetation in the northeastern Sertão is the Caatinga, characterized by drought-resistant flora composed of herbs, shrubs, cacti and small trees that are twisted, thorny, and have small, deciduous leaves.

Quixeramobim

Climate chart (precipitation, max. and min. temperature)
J	F	M	A	M	J	J	A	S	O	N	D
42 33 24	88 33 23	171 32 24	160 31 23	100 29 22	40 30 21	21 31 21	9 33 22	4 35 23	2 35 23	6 35 23	16 34 24
- █ Average max. and min. temperatures in °C
- █ Precipitation totals in mm
Imperial conversion
J	F	M	A	M	J	J	A	S	O	N	D
1.7 91 75	3.5 91 73	6.7 90 75	6.3 88 73	3.9 84 72	1.6 86 70	0.8 88 70	0.4 91 72	0.2 95 73	0.1 95 73	0.2 95 73	0.6 93 75
- █ Average max. and min. temperatures in °F
- █ Precipitation totals in inches

Because the sertão lies just south of the equator, temperatures are nearly uniform throughout the year and are typically tropical, often extremely hot in the west.

However, the sertão is distinctive in its low rainfall compared to other areas of Brazil. Because of the relatively cool temperatures in the South Atlantic Ocean, the Intertropical Convergence Zone remains north of the region for most of the year, so that most of the year is very dry.

Although annual rainfall averages between 500 millimetres (20 in) and 800 millimetres (31 in) over most of the sertão and 1,300 millimetres (51 in) on the northern coast at Fortaleza, it is confined to a short rainy season. This season extends from January to April in the west, but in the eastern sertão it generally occurs from March to June. However, rainfall is extremely erratic and in some years the rains are minimal, leading to catastrophic drought, while in others rains are extremely heavy and floods occur. This variability has caused extreme famines among subsistence farmers in the region, exacerbated by the extreme imbalance of land ownership throughout the sertão. The worst of these famines, between 1877 and 1879, was said to have killed over half the region's population.

In its natural state, the sertão was covered by a distinctive scrubby caatinga vegetation, consisting generally of low thorny bushes adapted to the extreme climate. Several species of tree in the caatinga, such as the cashew, have become valuable horticultural plants. Most of the sertão vegetation is now substantially degraded as a result of centuries of cattle ranching or clearing for cotton farming.

Parts of the sertão are recognized as a biodiversity hot-spot because of its unique flora.

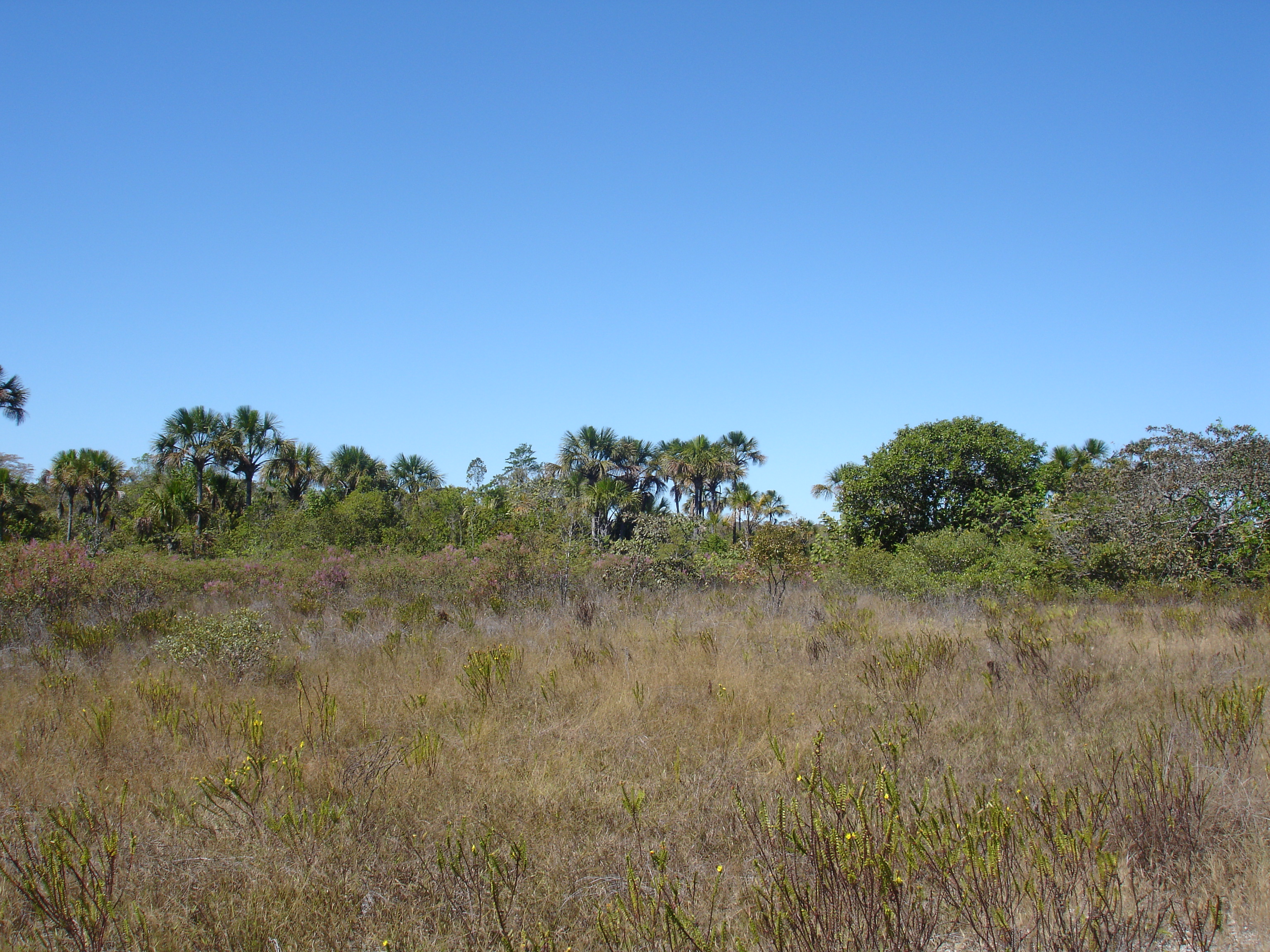
Sertão in the Grande Sertão Veredas National Park

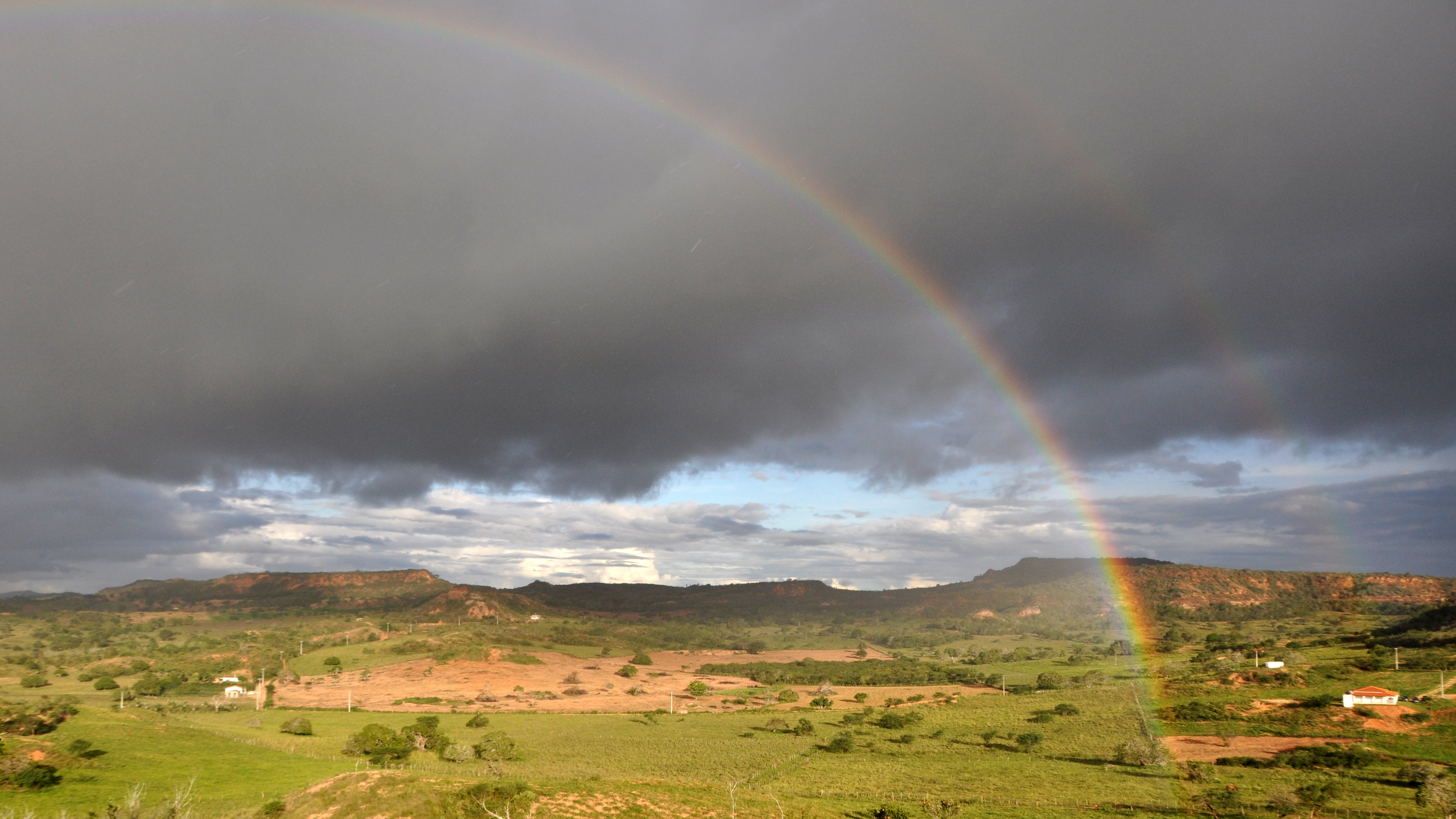
Rainbow at Brazilian Sertão (desert). Cícero Dantas, Bahia, Brazil.

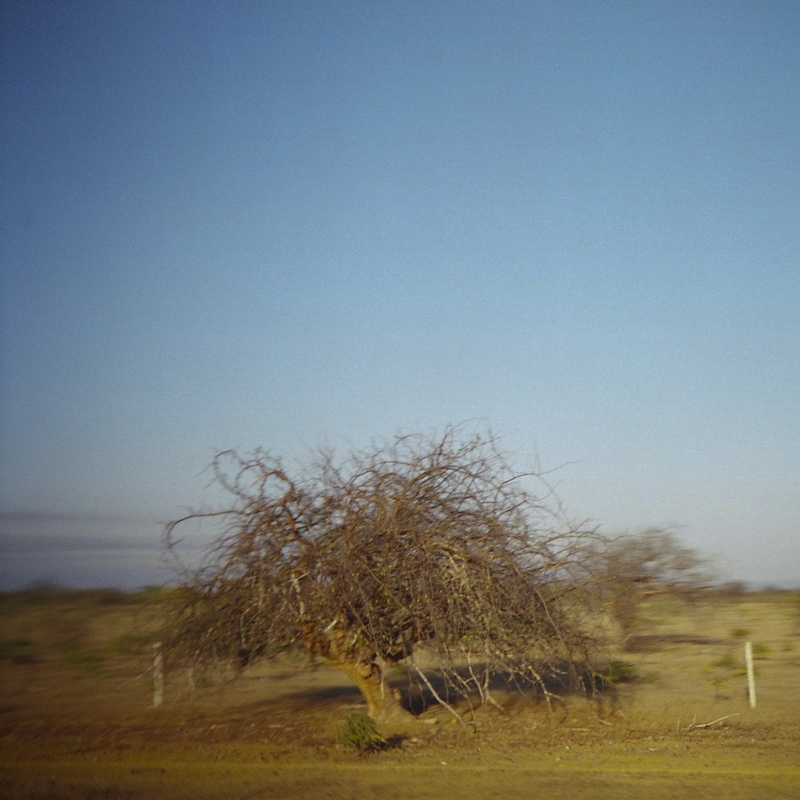
The Sertão (desert) of Brazil

== Demography ==
=== Ethnography ===
The population of the northeastern Sertão was formed mainly by the mixture between Europeans and Jê Indigenous peoples, with participation also from the black population.

== Culture ==
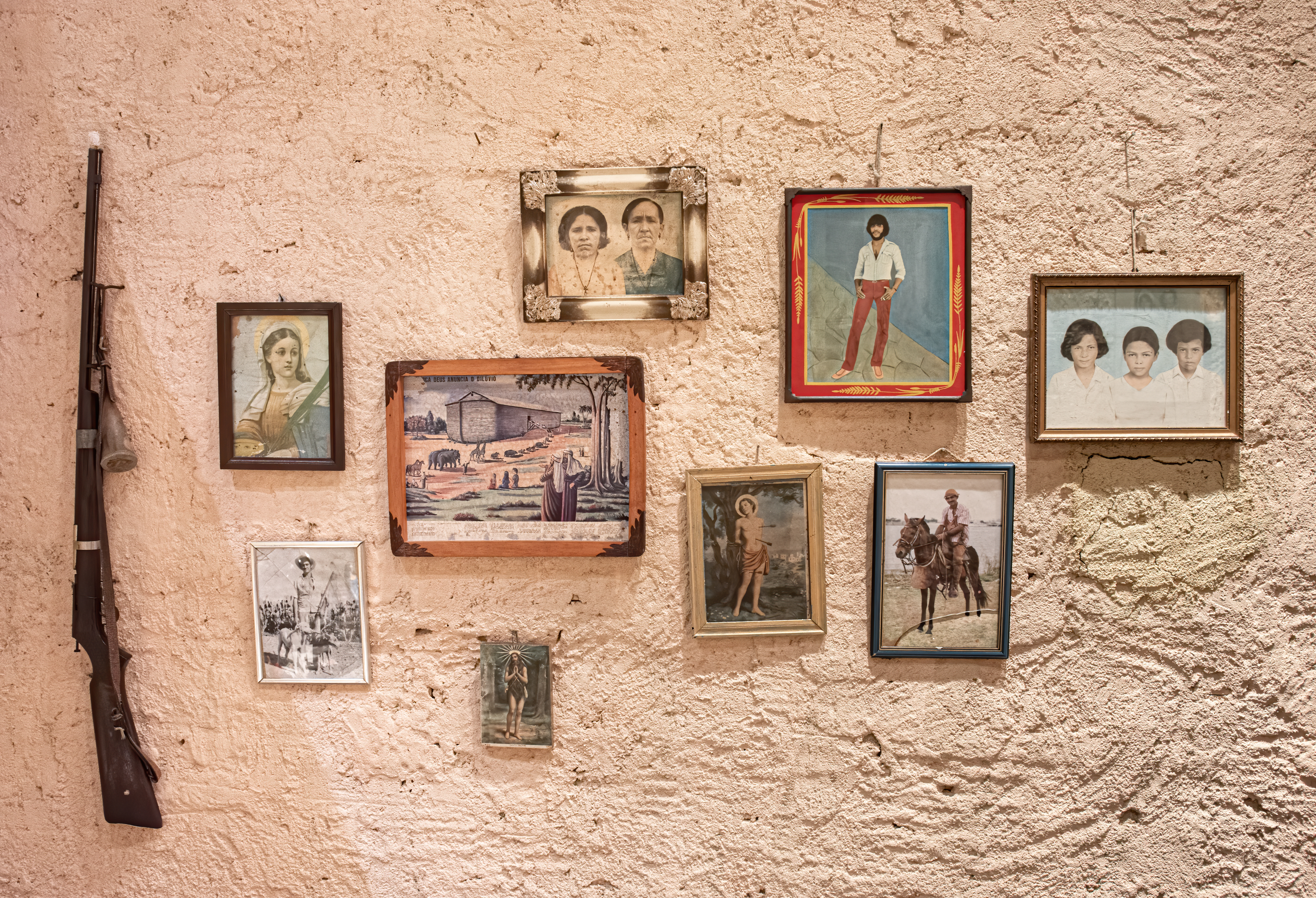
Living room of a rural house in northeastern Brazil

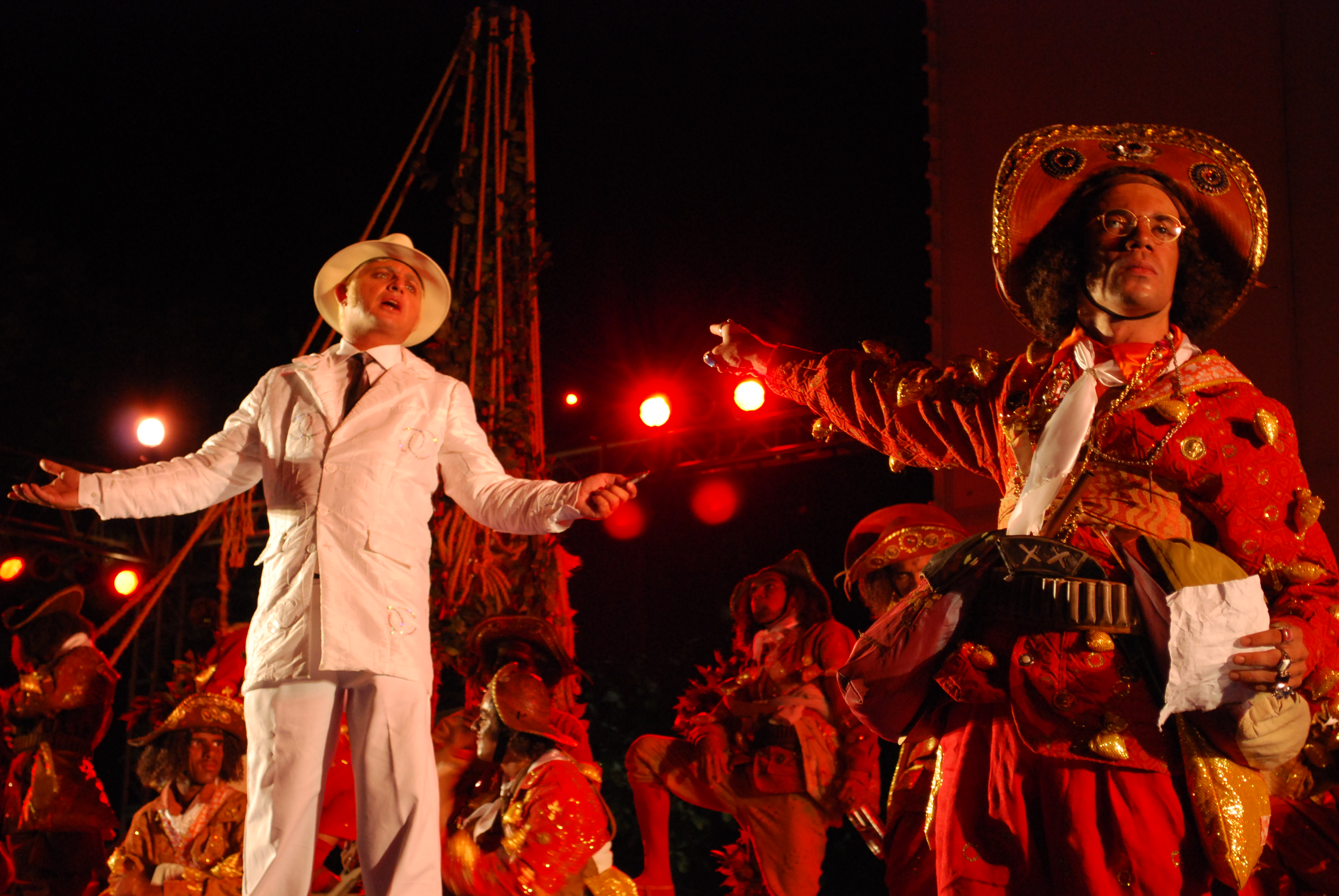
The "Chuva de Bala" performance during the Mossoró Cidade Junina festivities in Mossoró, Rio Grande do Norte

Although not widely publicized in mainstream media, the Sertão region is rich in the culture of popular poetry. There is a large number of people skilled in the art of rhyming and improvising verses. Through these repentistas, some songs became nationally known: for example, the song "Mulher nova bonita e carinhosa", known in the interpretation of the Ceará singer Amelinha and the Paraíba musician Zé Ramalho, was composed by the repentista singer from Pernambuco, Otacílio Batista. Another example is the song "A volta da asa branca", written by Zé Dantas, another sertanejo from Pernambuco, from the city of Carnaíba.

The culture of Northern Minas Gerais is one of the richest in Brazil and varies from region to region, but is based on religious and folkloric festivals such as the raising of the mast and the famous Catopês of the August Festivals in Montes Claros. It has strong influence from legends and beliefs surrounding the São Francisco River in riverside cities such as Januária, Pirapora, Manga and others. In the Grande Sertão Veredas region, there is a strong tradition of the Folia of the Three Wise Men, which takes place every year at the beginning of the year: revelers go from house to house and are served pão de queijo baked in a rural oven, cachaça and coffee. A large celebration at the house of one of the revelers or devotees closes the festivities. The Jequitinhonha Valley is also very culturally rich.

== See also ==
- Agreste
- Brazil Socio-Geographic Division
- Brazilian literature
- Caatinga
- Drought
- History of Brazil
- Os Sertões, a classic book about the sertão.
- Tieta do Agreste, a Brazilian novel and film
- Grande Sertão: Veredas, João Guimarães Rosa novel

== Sources ==
=== Nonfiction ===
- Michael H. Glantz; Currents of Change: El Niño's Impact on Climate and Society; published 1996 by Cambridge University Press. ISBN 0-521-57659-8.
- Michael H. Glantz (ed.); Drought Follows The Plow: Cultivating Marginal Areas; published 1994 by Cambridge University Press. ISBN 0-521-44252-4.
- Fagan, Brian; Floods, Famines, and Emperors: El Niño and the Fate of Civilizations; published 2000 by Basic Books. ISBN 0-465-01121-7.
- Nicholas G. Arons; Waiting for Rain: The Politics and Poetry of Drought in Northeast Brazil; published 2004 by University of Arizona Press. ISBN 0-8165-2433-5.
- Euclides da Cunha, Rebellion in the Backlands (Os Sertões), 1902

=== Fiction ===
- Graciliano Ramos, Vidas Secas ("Barren Lives"), novel
