= Parnamirim, Pernambuco =

Municipality of Pernambuco, Brazil

Parnamirim
- Municipality of Pernambuco, Brazil
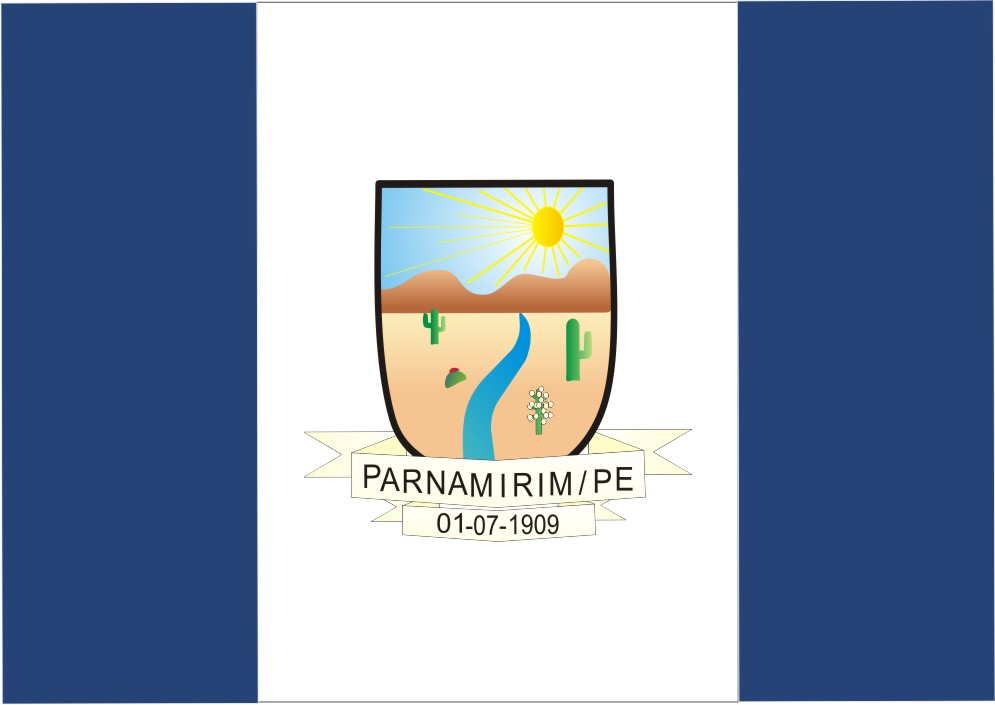
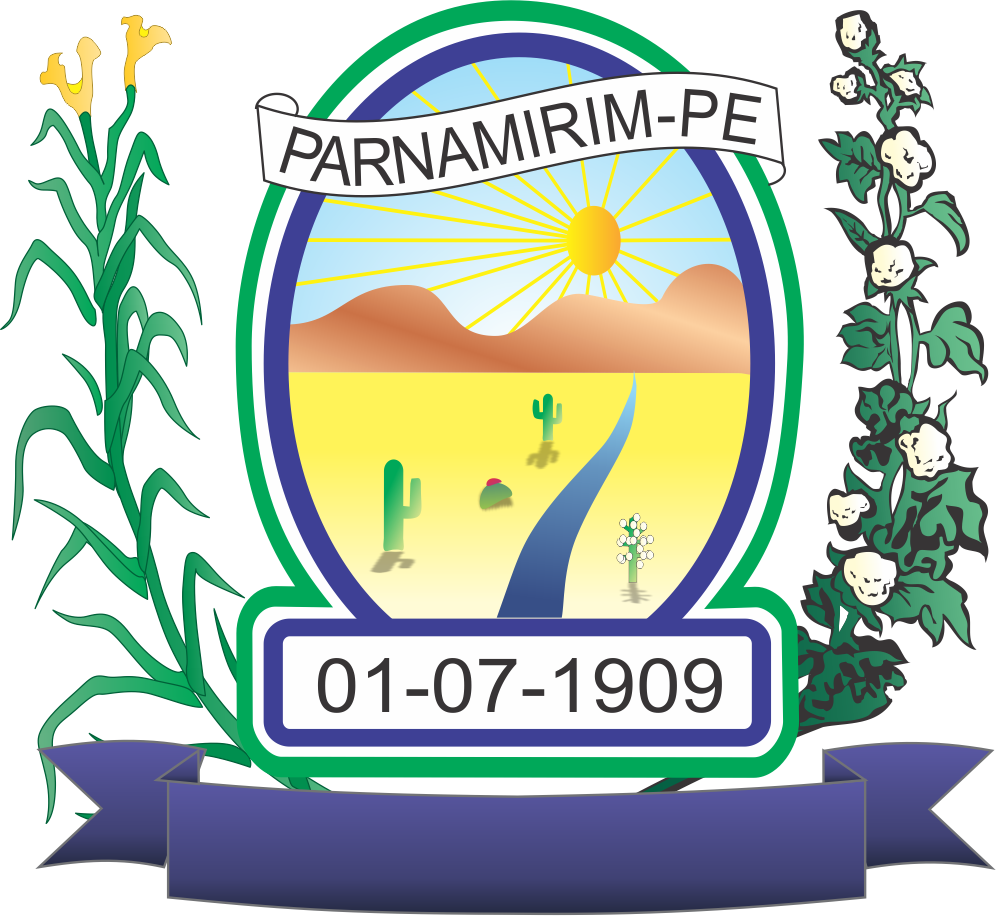
- Flag Coat of arms
- Motto: Brazilian Portuguese: Terra de Sant'Ana; English: Land of Saint Anne
- Location of Parnamirim in Pernambuco

- Location within Brazil Location within South America
- Coordinates: 8°5′27″S 39°34′40″W
- Country: Brazil
- Region: Northeast
- State: Pernambuco
- Founded: 1 July 1909

Government
  - Mayor: Lucelio Mucio Moura Angelim (PP) (2025-2028)
  - Vice Mayor: Nivaldo Mendes de Sá (UNIÃO) (2025-2028)

Area
  - Total: 2,609.548 km^{2} (1,007.552 sq mi)
- Elevation: 392 m (1,286 ft)

Population (2022 Census)
  - Total: 18,612
  - Estimate (2025): 18,960
  - Density: 7.13/km^{2} (18.5/sq mi)
- Demonym: Parnamirinense (Brazilian Portuguese)
- Time zone: UTC-03:00 (Brasília Time)
- Postal code: 56163-000, 56165-000, 56168-000
- HDI (2010): 0.599 – medium
- Website: parnamirim.pe.gov.br

Parnamirim (Central northeastern portuguese pronunciation: [pɐɦnɐmiˈɾĩ]) is a city in the state of Pernambuco, Brazil. The population in 2025, according with IBGE was 18,960 and the area is 2609.5 km^{2}. It is also, the start point of BR 232, one important federal highway.

== Geography ==
- State - Pernambuco
- Region - Sertão Pernambucano
- Boundaries - Granito, Serrita and Bodocó (N); Santa Maria da Boa Vista and Orocó (S); Terra Nova and Cabrobó (E); Ouricuri and Santa Cruz (W)
- Area - 2.608.07 km²
- Elevation - 392 m
- Hydrography - Brigida and Terra Nova rivers
- Vegetation - Caatinga Hiperxerófila
- Climate - semi arid - hot and dry
- Annual average temperature - 26.0 c
- Distance to Recife - 554 km

== Economy ==
The main economic activities in Parnamirim are commerce and agribusiness, especially farming of goats, cattle, sheep, pigs, chickens; and plantations of onions, beans and water melons.

=== Economic Indicators ===
Population	GDP x(1000 R$).	GDP pc (R$)	PE
19.850	68.057	3.542	0.11%

Economy by Sector 2006

Primary sector	Secondary sector	Service sector
15.21%	9.11%	75.68%

=== Health Indicators ===
HDI (2000)	Hospitals (2007)	Hospitals beds (2007)	Children's Mortality every 1000 (2005)
0.665	1	29	31.5

== See also ==
- List of municipalities in Pernambuco
