= Serrita =

Municipality of Pernambuco, Brazil

Coordinates: 7°56′S 39°19′W

- City
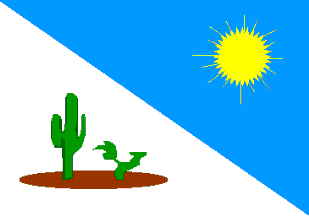
- Flag

- Location within Brazil
- Country: Brazil
- State: Pernambuco
- Region: Sertão Pernambucano
- Municipality: Serrita

Area
  - Total: 1,603.6 km^{2} (619.2 sq mi)
  - Land: 1,603.6 km^{2} (619.2 sq mi)
  - Water: 0 km^{2} (0 sq mi)
- Elevation: 419 m (1,375 ft)

Population (2022 Census)
  - Total: 18,207
  - Estimate (2025): 18,764
- Time zone: UTC-3 (BRT)
  - Summer (DST): UTC-2 (BRST)

Serrita (Central northeastern portuguese pronunciation: [sɛˈhitɐ]) is a city in the state of Pernambuco, Brazil. The population in 2025, according to IBGE was 18,764 inhabitants and the total area is 1535.2 km^{2}.

== Geography ==
- State - Pernambuco
- Region - Sertão Pernambucano
- Boundaries - Ceará state (N); Parnamirim and Terra Nova (S); Salgueiro and Cedro (E); Moreilândia and Granito (W).
- Area - 1603.6 km²
- Elevation - 419 m
- Hydrography - Brigida and Terra Nova rivers
- Vegetation - Caatinga hiperxerófila
- Climate - semi arid - (Sertão) hot
- Annual average temperature - 27.0 c
- Distance to Recife - 535.5 km

== Economy ==
The main economic activities in Serrita are based in agribusiness, especially creation of goats, sheep, pigss, cattle, horses, donkeys, chickens; and plantations of onions, beans and bananas.

=== Economic Indicators ===
Population	GDP x(1000 R$).	GDP pc (R$)	PE
18.958	51.246	2.811	0.085%

Economy by Sector 2006

Primary sector	Secondary sector	Service sector
13.04%	8.63%	78.32%

=== Health Indicators ===
HDI (2000)	Hospitals (2007)	Hospitals beds (2007)	Children's Mortality every 1000 (2005)
0.645	1	31	13.0

== See also ==
- List of municipalities in Pernambuco
