= Granito =

Municipality of Pernambuco, Brazil

Granito Município de Granito
- Municipality
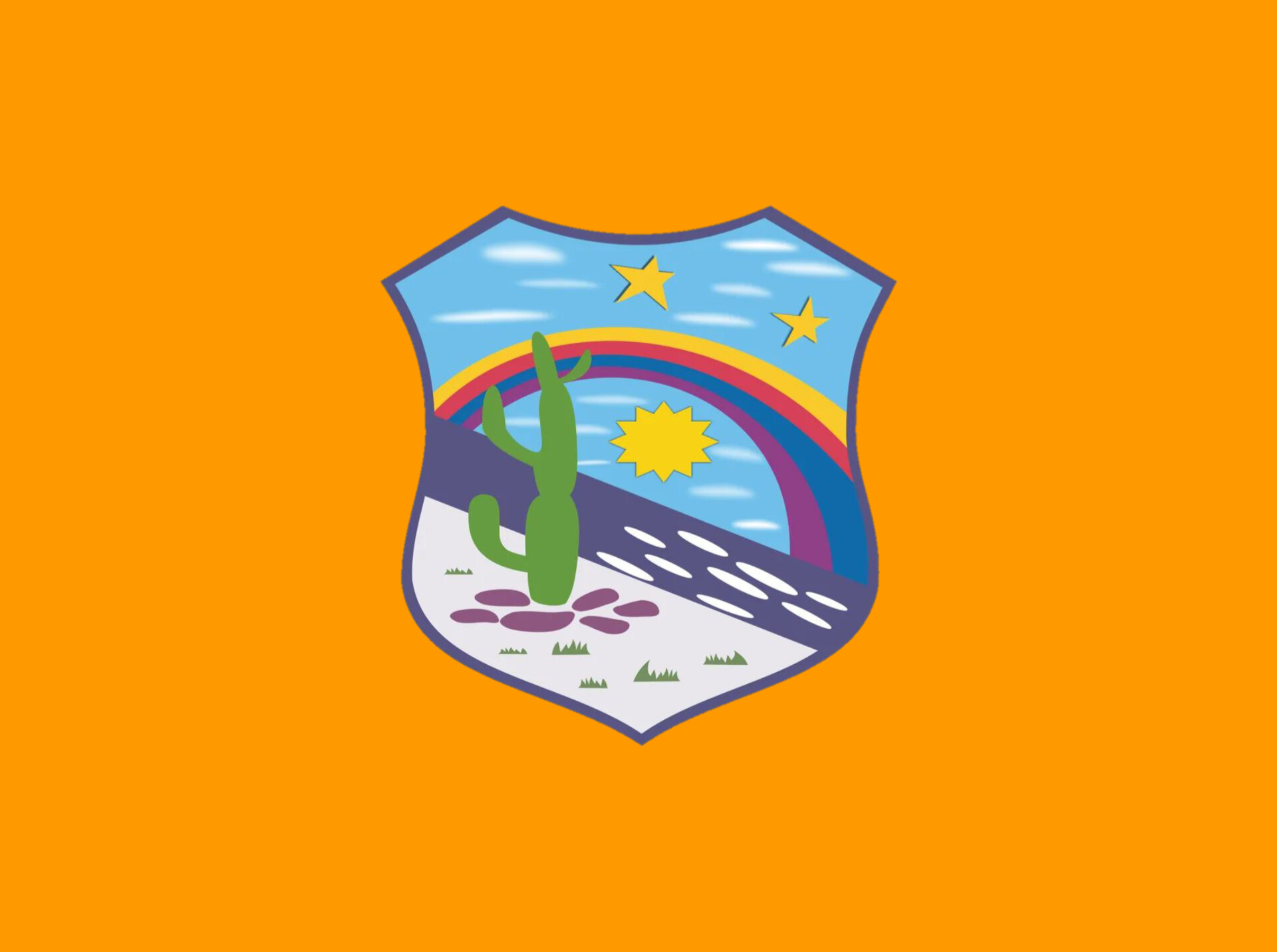
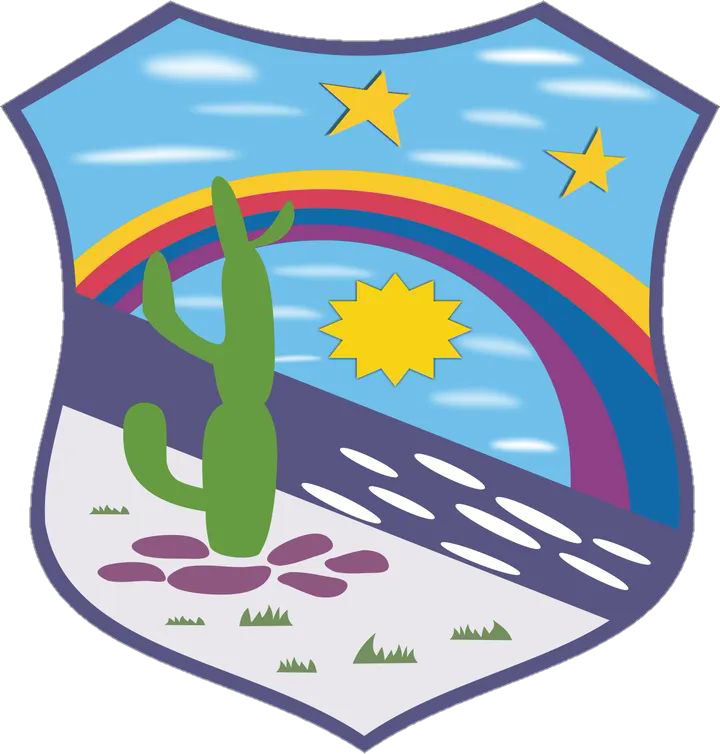
- Flag Coat of arms

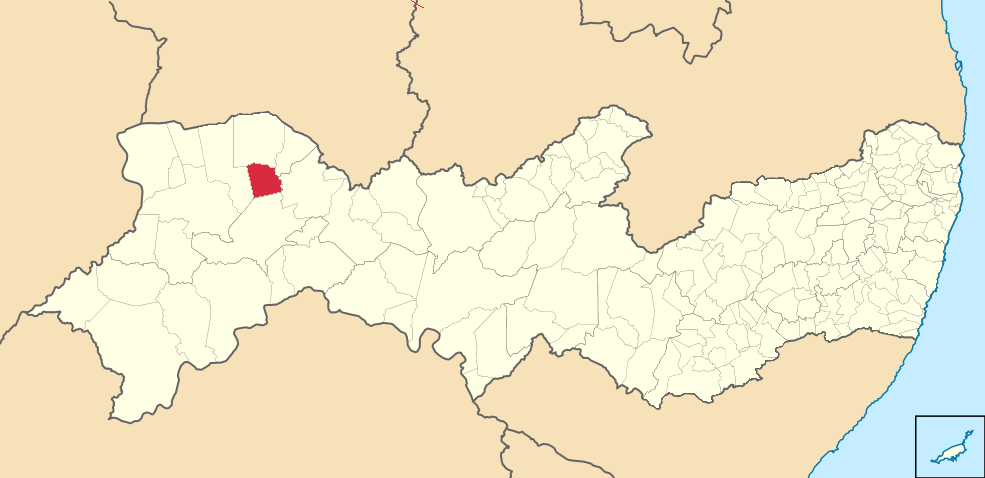
- Location of Granito in Pernambuco

- Location of Granito in Brazil
- Coordinates: 07°42′57″S 39°36′54″W
- Country: Brazil
- Region: Northeast
- State: Pernambuco
- Founded: March 1, 1890

Government
  - Mayor: Antonio Carlos Pereira (PDT, 2013–2016)

Area
  - Total: 522 km^{2} (202 sq mi)
- Elevation: 447 m (1,467 ft)

Population (2022 Census)
  - Total: 6,967
  - Estimate (2025): 7,217
  - Density: 13.3/km^{2} (34.6/sq mi)
- Demonym: Granitense
- Time zone: UTC−3 (BRT)
- Website: granito.pe.gov.br

Granito (Central northeastern portuguese pronunciation: [ɡɾɐ̃ˈnitŭ]) (Granite) is a city in the state of Pernambuco, Brazil. The population in 2025, according with IBGE was 7,217 inhabitants and the total area is 521.69 square kilometres (201.43 mi^{2}).

== Geography ==
- State - Pernambuco
- Region - Sertão Pernambucano
- Boundaries - Exu and Moreilândia (N); Parnamirim (S); Serrita (E); Bodocó (W).
- Area - 521.86 km^{2}
- Elevation - 447 m
- Hydrography - Brigida River
- Vegetation - Caatinga
- Climate - semi arid - (Sertão) hot
- Annual average temperature - 25.4 c
- Distance to Recife - 592 km

== Economy ==
The main economic activities in Granito are based in agribusiness, especially creation of cattle, sheep, goats, donkeys, chickens; and plantations of corn.

=== Economic Indicators ===
| Population | GDP x(1000 R$). | GDP pc (R$) | PE |
|---|---|---|---|
| 6.944 | 19.682 | 2.985 | 0.033% |

Economy by Sector 2006

| Primary sector | Secondary sector | Service sector |
|---|---|---|
| 16.28% | 7.69% | 76.03% |

=== Health Indicators ===
| HDI (2000) | Hospitals (2007) | Hospitals beds (2007) | Children's Mortality every 1000 (2005) |
|---|---|---|---|
| 0.597 | 1 | 20 | 28.0 |

== See also ==
- List of municipalities in Pernambuco
