= Caio Matias =

Brazilian footballer (born 1994)

Personal information
- Full name: Caio Matias Marques
- Date of birth: 14 May 1994 (age 32)
- Place of birth: Ouricuri, Pernambuco, Brazil
- Height: 1.78 m (5 ft 10 in)
- Position: Midfielder

Team information
- Current team: Aittitos Spata
- Number: 20

Youth career
- Araripina
- 2012–2013: Porto-PE

Senior career*
Years	Team	Apps	(Gls)
2013–2016	Porto-PE	37	(0)
2015	→ Náutico (loan)	0	(0)
2019	Aittitos Spata	4	(0)
2020	Boa Esporte	0	(0)
2020	CEOV Operário	3	(0)
2020	Murici	4	(0)
2020	Coruripe	10	(0)
2021	Parnahyba	10	(0)
Total		68	(0)
- * Club domestic league appearances and goals

Caio Matias Marques (born 14 May 1994), commonly known as Caio Matias, is a Brazilian former footballer.

== Career ==
Born in Ouricuri in the Brazilian state of Pernambuco, Matias started his career with Araripina, 65 kilometres from his home. In 2012, at the age of seventeen, he was invited to join the academy of Pernambuco-based Porto, and quickly integrated himself into the club's under-20 squad. The following year he would make his professional debut, and over the next two seasons he established himself in the first-team. His performances, as well as featuring at the 2015 Summer Universiade with Brazil, earned him a loan move to Série B club Náutico in 2015.

However, he failed to make an appearance for Náutico, and in his last season with Porto he only made one appearance in the Campeonato Pernambucano. In January 2019, he moved to Greece to sign for Football League club Aittitos Spata. He returned to Brazil the following year, having a short spell with Boa Esporte before joining CEOV Operário. However it was with Murici that he impressed in the 2020 Campeonato Alagoano. After featuring for Coruripe in the Série D, his last club would be Parnahyba, whom he joined in February 2021.

== Career statistics ==
=== Club ===
Appearances and goals by club, season and competition
Club	Season	League			State League		Cup (Note: Includes Copa do Brasil and Greek Cup)		Other		Total	
Club	Season	Division	Apps	Goals	Apps	Goals	Apps	Goals	Apps	Goals	Apps	Goals
Porto-PE	2013	–			1 (Note: Appearances in the Campeonato Pernambucano)	0	0	0	0	0	1	0
Porto-PE	2014	Série D	3	0	18	0	0	0	0	0	21	0
Porto-PE	2015	–			14	0	0	0	0	0	14	0
Porto-PE	2016	–			1	0	0	0	0	0	1	0
Porto-PE	Total		3	0	34	0	0	0	0	0	37	0
Náutico (loan)	2015	Série B	0	0	0	0	0	0	0	0	0	0
Aittitos Spata	2018–19	Football League	4	0	–		0	0	0	0	4	0
Boa Esporte	2020	–			0	0	0	0	0	0	0	0
CEOV Operário	2020	–			3 (Note: Appearances in the Campeonato Mato-Grossense)	0	1	0	0	0	4	0
Murici	2020	–			4 (Note: Appearances in the Campeonato Alagoano)	0	0	0	0	0	4	0
Coruripe	2020	Série D	10	0	0	0	0	0	0	0	10	0
Parnahyba	2021	–			10 (Note: Appearances in the Campeonato Piauiense)	0	0	0	0	0	10	0
Career total			17	0	51	0	1	0	0	0	69	0
