= Pitanga River =

There are several rivers named Pitanga River in Brazil:

- Pitanga River (Paraná)
- Pitanga River (Pernambuco)
- Pitanga River (Sergipe)

== See also ==
- Pitanga (disambiguation)
