= Bodocó =

Municipality of Pernambuco, Brazil

- Municipality
- Flag Coat of arms

- Location in Pernambuco

- Location in Brazil
- Coordinates: 7°46′40″S 39°56′27″W
- Country: Brazil
- Region: Northeast
- State: Pernambuco
- Creation of municipality: 1909

Government
  - Mayor: Otávio Augusto Tavares Pedrosa Cavalcante (Brazilian Socialist Party (PSB))

Area
  - Total: 1,621.79 km^{2} (626.18 sq mi)
- Elevation: 443 m (1,453 ft)

Population (2022 Census)
  - Total: 34,478
  - Estimate (2025): 36,145
  - Density: 21.259/km^{2} (55.061/sq mi)
- Demonym: bodocense
- Time zone: UTC−3 (BRT)
- Website: www.bodoco.pe.gov.br (in Portuguese)

Bodocó (Central northeastern portuguese pronunciation: [bɔdɔˈkɔ]) is a municipality in the state of Pernambuco, Brazil. Its population in 2025, according to the IBGE, was an estimated 36,145 and its area is 1621.785 km². Bodocó was established in 1909 from territory of the municipality of Granito.

Its current mayor (Brazilian Portuguese: Prefeito) is Otávio Augusto Tavares Pedrosa Cavalcante of the Brazilian Socialist Party, elected in 2020.

== Geography ==
- Region – Sertão of Pernambuco
- Boundaries – state of Ceará (N); Parnamirim (S); Exu and Granito (E); Ouricuri and Ipubi (W)
- Area – 1553.85 km²
- Elevation – 443 m
- Drainage basin – Brigida River
- Vegetation – Caatinga (shrubland)
- Climate – semi-arid, hot and dry, Köppen: BSh
- Annual average temperature – 25.6°C
- Distance to Recife – 642.6 km

== Economy ==
The main economic activities in Bodocó are based in commerce and agribusiness, especially the farming of goats, cattle, sheep, horses, donkeys, pigs, and honey, and cultivation of corn and manioc.

=== Economic indicators ===
Population (2010)	GDP in thousands of Reais (R$) (2013)	GDP per capita (R$) (2013)	Percent of Pernambuco GDP (2013)	References
35,158	189,435	5,150	0.17%	

Economy by sector (as of 2013)

Primary sector	Secondary sector	Service sector	References
11.30%	3.23%	85.47%	

=== Health indicators ===
HDI (2010)	Hospitals (2015)	Hospital beds (2015)	Infant mortality rate per 1000 live births (2013)	References
0.565 (low)	1	28	13.18	

== See also ==
- List of municipalities in Pernambuco
