= Afrânio =

Municipality of Pernambuco, Brazil

- Municipality
- The Municipality of Afrânio
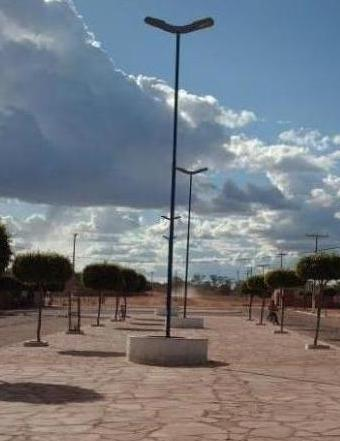
- A square in Extreme, a parish of Afrânio.

- Flag Coat of arms

- Location within Brazil
- Coordinates: 08°30′54″S 41°00′18″W
- Country: Brazil
- Region: Northeast
- State: Pernambuco
- Founded: December 20, 1963

Government
  - Mayor: Carlos Cavalcanti (PTB)

Area
  - Total: 1,490.6 km^{2} (575.5 sq mi)
- Elevation: 522 m (1,713 ft)

Population (2022 Census)
  - Total: 18,674
  - Estimate (2025): 19,409
  - Density: 11.7/km^{2} (30/sq mi)
- Time zone: UTC−3 (BRT)
  - Summer (DST): UTC08º30'54" S, 41º00'18" O
- HDI (2000): 0.634 – medium

Afrânio (Central northeastern portuguese pronunciation: [ɐˈfɾɐ̃niw]) is a Brazilian municipality in the state of Pernambuco. It is the westernmost municipality of Pernambuco. It is located in the mesoregion of São Francisco Pernambucano . Afrânio has a total area of 1491.5 square kilometers and had an estimated population of 19,409 inhabitants in 2025 according with IBGE.

== Geography ==
- State - Pernambuco
- Region - São Francisco Pernambucano
- Boundaries - Piauí state (N and W); Bahia state (S); Petrolina and Dormentes (E)
- Area - 1490.6 km^{2}
- Elevation - 522 m / 1713 ft
- Hydrography - Pontal River
- Vegetation - Caatinga Hiperxerófila.
- Climate - Semi arid, ( Sertao) - hot and dry
- Yearly average temperature - 24.8 C
- Distance to Recife - 883 km

== Economy ==
The main economic activities in Afrânio are based in general commerce and agribusiness, especially plantations of beans and corn; and creations of sheep, goats, donkeys and cattle.

=== Economic Indicators ===
Population	GDP x(1000 R$).	GDP pc (R$)	PE
17.445	51.114	3.103	0.085%

Economy by Sector 2006

Primary sector	Secondary sector	Service sector
12.24%	8.18%	79.58%

=== Health Indicators ===
HDI (2000)	Hospitals (2007)	Hospitals beds (2007)	Children's Mortality every 1000 (2005)
0.634	1	35	26.6

== See also ==
- List of municipalities in Pernambuco
