= Trindade, Pernambuco =

Municipality of Pernambuco, Brazil

Trindade
- Municipality
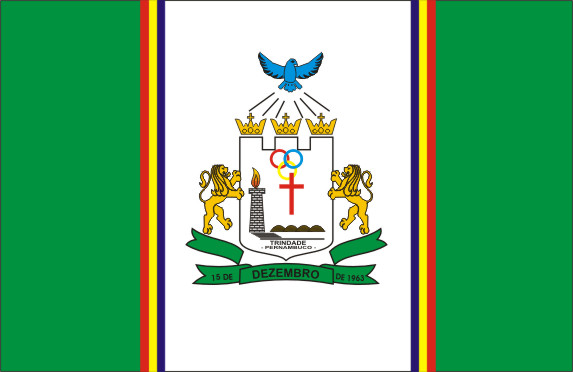
- Flag

- Location in Pernambuco

- Location in Brazil
- Coordinates: 7°45′43″S 40°16′04″W
- Country: Brazil
- Region: Northeast
- State: Pernambuco

Government
  - Mayor: Helbe Da Silva Rodrigues Nascimento

Area
  - Total: 229.57 km^{2} (88.64 sq mi)
- Elevation: 518 m (1,699 ft)

Population (2022 Census)
  - Total: 30,321
  - Estimate (2025): 32,257
  - Density: 102.52/km^{2} (265.5/sq mi)
- Time zone: UTC−3 (BRT)

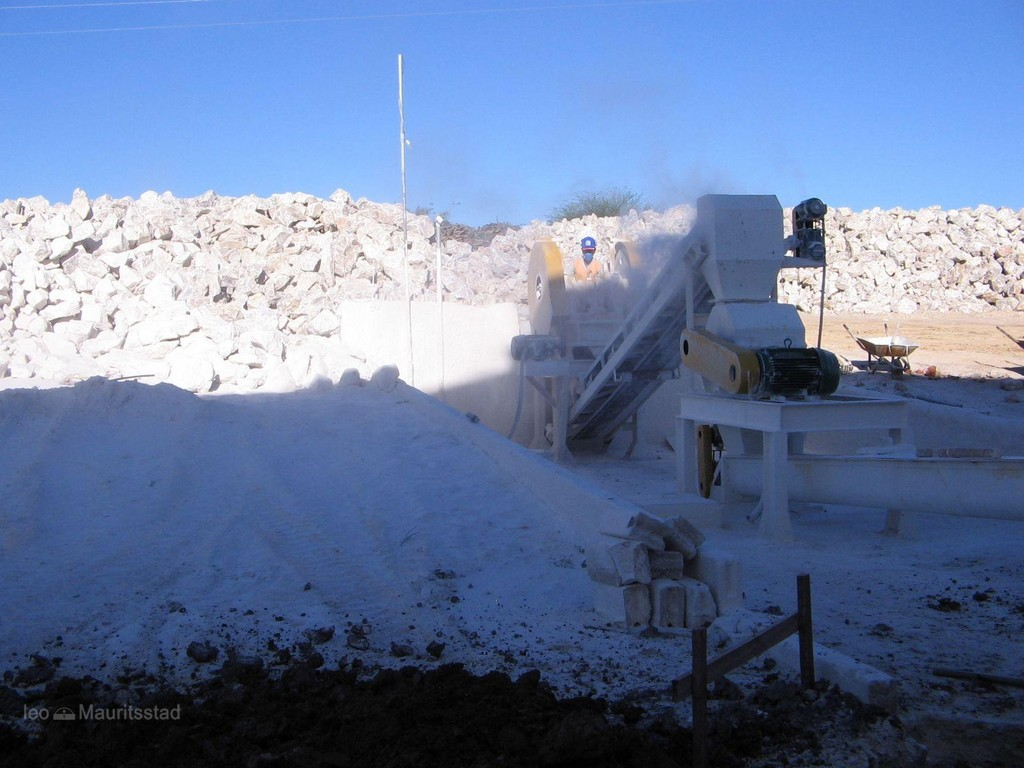
Gypsum exploration in Trindade, Araripina Microregion

Trindade (Central northeastern portuguese pronunciation: [tɾĩˈdɐdi]) is a municipality in the state of Pernambuco, Brazil. The population in 2025, according to the IBGE, was 32,257 inhabitants and had a total area of 295.765 km².

== Geography ==
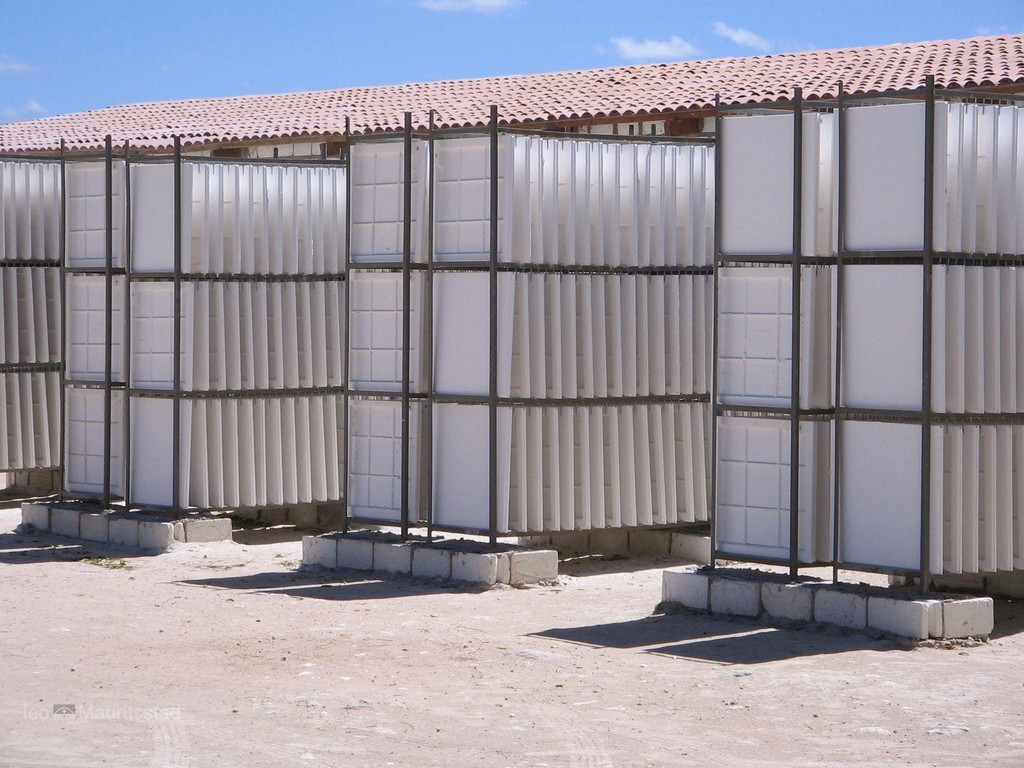
Gypsum products in Trindade

- State - Pernambuco
- Region - Sertão Pernambucano
- Boundaries - Araripina (N and W); Ouricuri (S); Ouricuri and Ipubi (E).
- Area - 229.57 km²
- Elevation - 518 m
- Hydrography - Brigida River
- Vegetation - Caatinga hiperxerófila
- Climate - semi arid - (Sertão) hot
- Annual average temperature - 24.9 c
- Distance to Recife - 645 km
- Population at last census (2022) - 30,321

== Economy ==
The main economic activities in Trindade are based in non metallic (gypsum) industry, commerce and agribusiness, especially rearing of cattle, goats, sheep, pigs, chickens; and plantations of manioc. Trindade is located in the micro region of Araripina, which contains 95% of the Brazilian reserves of gypsum.

=== Economic Indicators ===
Population	GDP x(1000 R$).	GDP pc (R$)	PE
30,321	80.477	3.266	0.137%

Economy by Sector 2006

Primary sector	Secondary sector	Service sector
3.70%	18.30%	78.00%

=== Health Indicators ===
HDI (2000)	Hospitals (2007)	Hospitals beds (2007)	Children's Mortality every 1000 (2005)
0.641	3	77	34.2

== See also ==
- List of municipalities in Pernambuco
