= Santa Maria da Boa Vista =

Municipality of Pernambuco, Brazil

- Municipality of Pernambuco, Brazil
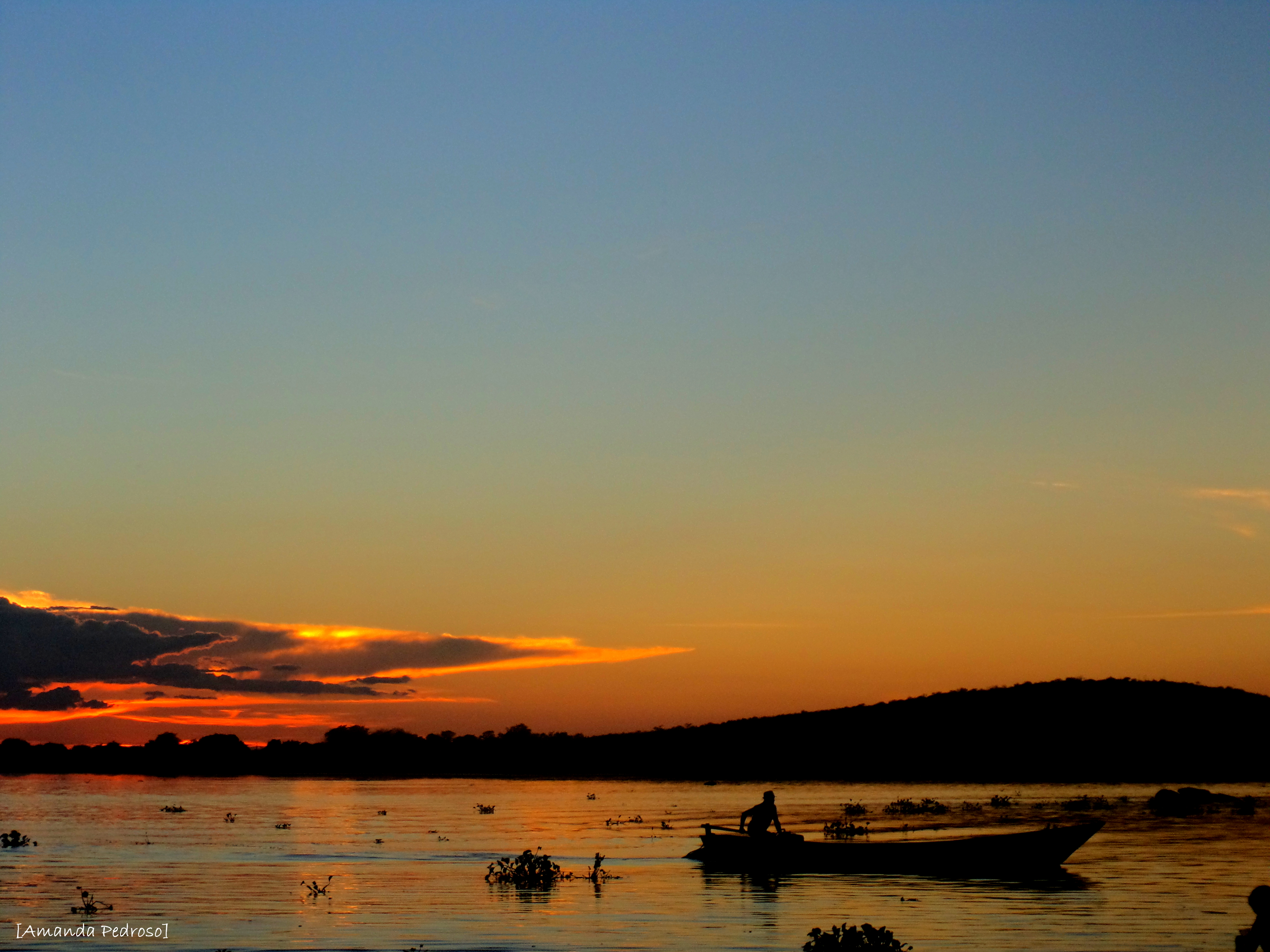
- São Francisco River in Santa Maria da Boa Vista

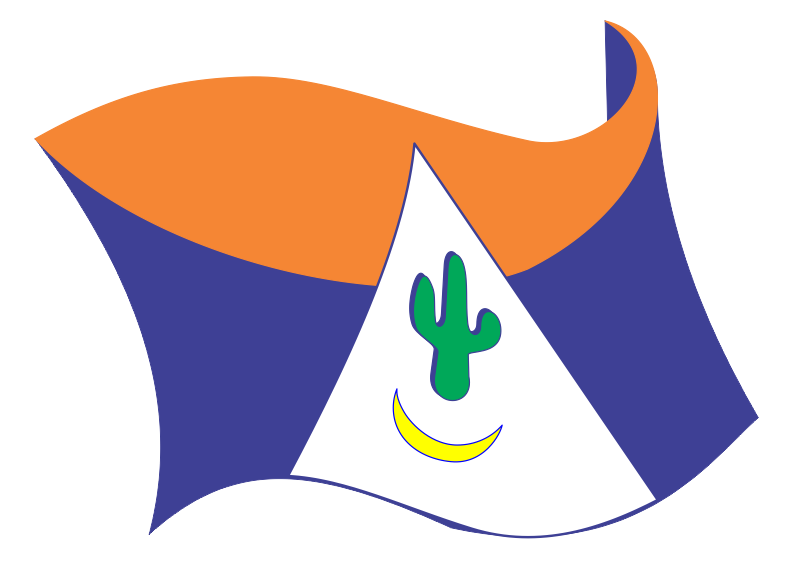
- Flag

- Location of Santa Maria da Boa Vista in Pernambuco

- Location within Brazil Location within South America
- Coordinates: 8°48′32″S 39°49′30″W
- Country: Brazil
- Region: Northeast
- State: Pernambuco
- Founded: 7 June 1872

Government
  - Mayor: George Rodrigues Duarte (PP) (2025-2028)
  - Vice Mayor: Anselmo Gomes da Silva (UNIÃO) (2025-2028)

Area
  - Total: 3,000.774 km^{2} (1,158.605 sq mi)
- Elevation: 361 m (1,184 ft)

Population (2022 Census)
  - Total: 40,578
  - Estimate (2025): 42,782
  - Density: 13.52/km^{2} (35.0/sq mi)
- Demonym: Boa-vistense (Brazilian Portuguese)
- Time zone: UTC-03:00 (Brasília Time)
- Postal code: 56380-000, 56386-000, 56390-000, 56393-000
- HDI (2010): 0.590 – medium
- Website: santamariadaboavista.pe.gov.br

Santa Maria da Boa Vista (Central northeastern portuguese pronunciation: [ˈsɐ̃tɐ mɐˈɾiɐ dɐ ˈboɐ ˈviʃtɐ]) is a municipality in the state of Pernambuco, Brazil. The population in 2025, according with IBGE was 42,782 and the area is 3000.77 km².

== Geography ==
- State - Pernambuco
- Region - São Francisco Pernambucano
- Boundaries - Parnamirim and Santa Cruz (N); Bahia state (S); Orocó (E); Lagoa Grande (W)
- Area - 3001.2 km²
- Elevation - 361 m
- Hydrography - Brigida and Garças rivers
- Vegetation - Caatinga hiperxerófila.
- Climate - Semi arid ( Sertão) - hot and dry
- Annual average temperature - 26.0 c
- Distance to Recife - 616 km

== Economy ==
The main economic activities in Santa Maria da Boa Vista are commerce and agribusiness, especially farming of goats, sheep, cattle and donkeys; and plantations of irrigated grapes, mangoes and bananas.

=== Economic Indicators ===
Population	GDP x(1000 R$).	GDP pc (R$)	PE
41.745	209.495	5.287	0.35%

Economy by Sector 2006

Primary sector	Secondary sector	Service sector
41.60%	9.80%	48.60%

=== Health Indicators ===
HDI (2000)	Hospitals (2007)	Hospitals beds (2007)	Children's Mortality every 1000 (2005)
0.669	1	33	20.8

== See also ==
- List of municipalities in Pernambuco
