= Exu, Pernambuco =

Municipality of Pernambuco, Brazil

Exu
- City
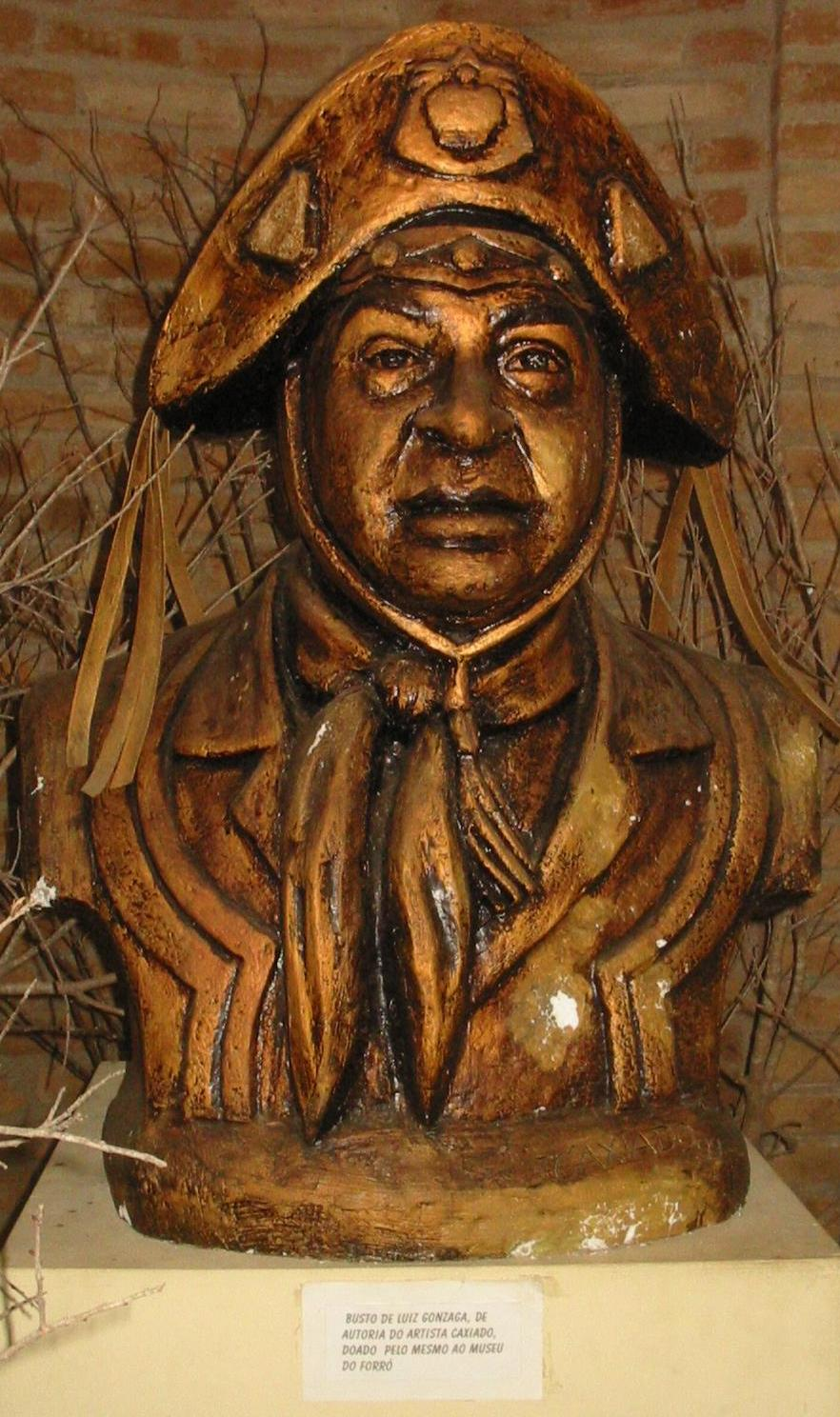
- Bust of the artist Luiz Gonzaga

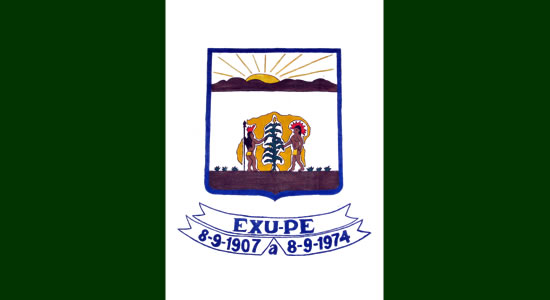
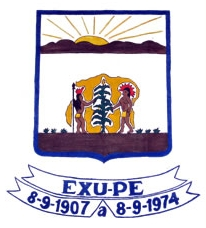
- Flag Coat of arms

- Exu Located in Brazil Map
- Coordinates: 7°30′43″S 39°43′26″W
- Country: Brazil
- State: Pernambuco
- Region: Sertão

Area
  - Total: 1,474 km^{2} (569 sq mi)
- Elevation: 523 m (1,716 ft)

Population (2022 Census)
  - Total: 31,843
  - Estimate (2025): 33,486
- Time zone: UTC−3 (BRT)
- Average Temperature: 24.8 C

Exu (Central northeastern portuguese pronunciation: [eˈʃu]) is a city in the state of Pernambuco, Brazil. The population in 2025, according with IBGE was 33,486 and the area is 1336.7 km². Exu is the birthplace of the famous Luiz Gonzaga (1912/1989) which was a very prominent Brazilian folk singer, songwriter, musician and poet. He is considered to be responsible for the promotion of northeastern music throughout the rest of the country. He is also known as the "king of baião" and "Gonzagão".

== Geography ==
- State – Pernambuco
- Region – Sertão Pernambucano
- Boundaries – Ceará state (N); Granito (S); Bodocó (W); Moreilândia (E)
- Area – 1474 km²
- Elevation – 523 m
- Hydrography – Brigida River
- Vegetation – Caatinga and Subperenifólia forest.
- Climate – transition between tropical hot and semi arid- hot and dry
- Annual average temperature – 24.8 c
- Distance to Recife – 607 km

== Economy ==
The main economic activities in Exu are based in agribusiness, especially creation of cattle, pigs, goats; and plantations of corn, beans, manioc, coffee and tobacco .

=== Economic Indicators ===
Population	GDP x(1000 R$).	GDP pc (R$)	PE
31,086	98,549	3,224	0.17%

Economy by Sector 2006

Primary sector	Secondary sector	Service sector
17.65%	7.28%	75.07%

=== Health Indicators ===
HDI (2000)	Hospitals (2007)	Hospitals beds (2007)	Children's Mortality every 1000 (2005)
0,592	1	32	34.1

== See also ==
- List of municipalities in Pernambuco
