= Moreilândia (footballer) =

Brazilian footballer

Personal information
- Full name: José Jeffson Cordeiro de Sá
- Date of birth: 13 April 1989 (age 37)
- Place of birth: Moreilândia, Brazil
- Height: 1.76 m (5 ft 9 1/2 in)
- Position: Midfielder

Team information
- Current team: Nacional de Patos

Senior career*
Years	Team	Apps	(Gls)
2006–2010	Salgueiro		
2010–2011	Trofense	9	(0)
2012	Mogi Mirim	7	(0)
2012	→ Catanduvense (loan)	0	(0)
2013–2017	Salgueiro	58	(1)
2018–2019	Fluminense de Feira	20	(0)
2019	América de Natal	5	(0)
2020	Retrô	4	(0)
2019–2020	ASA	6	(0)
2020–2021	Salgueiro	27	(0)
2021	Barcelona-BA	4	(0)
2022	Itabaiana	11	(0)
2023–	Nacional de Patos	30	(0)
- * Club domestic league appearances and goals as of 18:46, 6 June 2024 (UTC)

José Jefsson Cordeiro de Sá (born April 13, 1989, in Moreilândia), known as Moreilândia, is a Brazilian footballer who plays for Nacional de Patos as midfielder.

== Career statistics ==
As of 12 March 2017

Club	Season	League			State League		Cup		Conmebol		Other		Total	
Club	Season	Division	Apps	Goals	Apps	Goals	Apps	Goals	Apps	Goals	Apps	Goals	Apps	Goals
Salgueiro	2009	Série C	4	0	11	0	—		—		—		15	0
Salgueiro	2010	Série C	—		20	0	—		—		—		20	0
Salgueiro	Subtotal		4	0	31	0	—		—		—		35	0
Trofense	2010–11	Segunda Liga	8	0	—		3	0	—		—		11	0
Trofense	2011–12	Segunda Liga	1	0	—		2	0	—		—		3	0
Trofense	Subtotal		9	0	—		5	0	—		—		14	0
Catanduvense	2012	Paulista	—		4	0	—		—		—		4	0
Mogi Mirim	2012	Série D	7	0	—		—		—		—		7	0
Salgueiro	2013	Série D	13	0	11	0	8	0	—		6 (Note: All appearance(s) in Copa do Nordeste)	0	38	0
Salgueiro	2014	Série C	27	0	13	0	—		—		—		40	0
Salgueiro	2015	Série C	16	0	14	1	2	0	—		8	0	40	1
Salgueiro	2016	Série C	16	1	12	1	2	0	—		6	1	36	3
Salgueiro	2017	Série C	—		12	2	1	0	—		—		13	2
Salgueiro	Subtotal		72	1	62	4	13	0	—		20	1	167	6
Career total			92	1	97	4	18	0	0	0	20	1	227	6
