= Araripina =

Municipality of Pernambuco, Brazil

Coordinates: 8°40′S 35°43′W

- Municipality
- The Municipality of Araripina
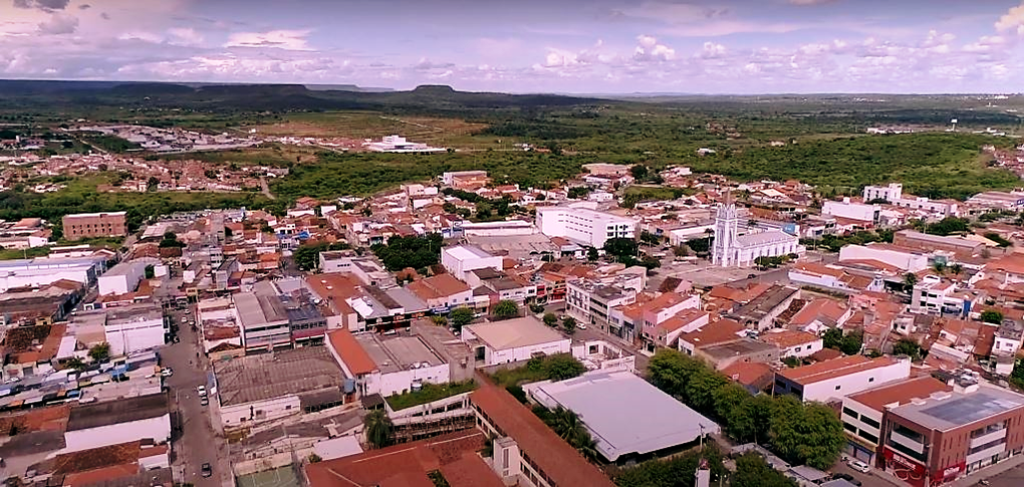
- View of the center of Araripina

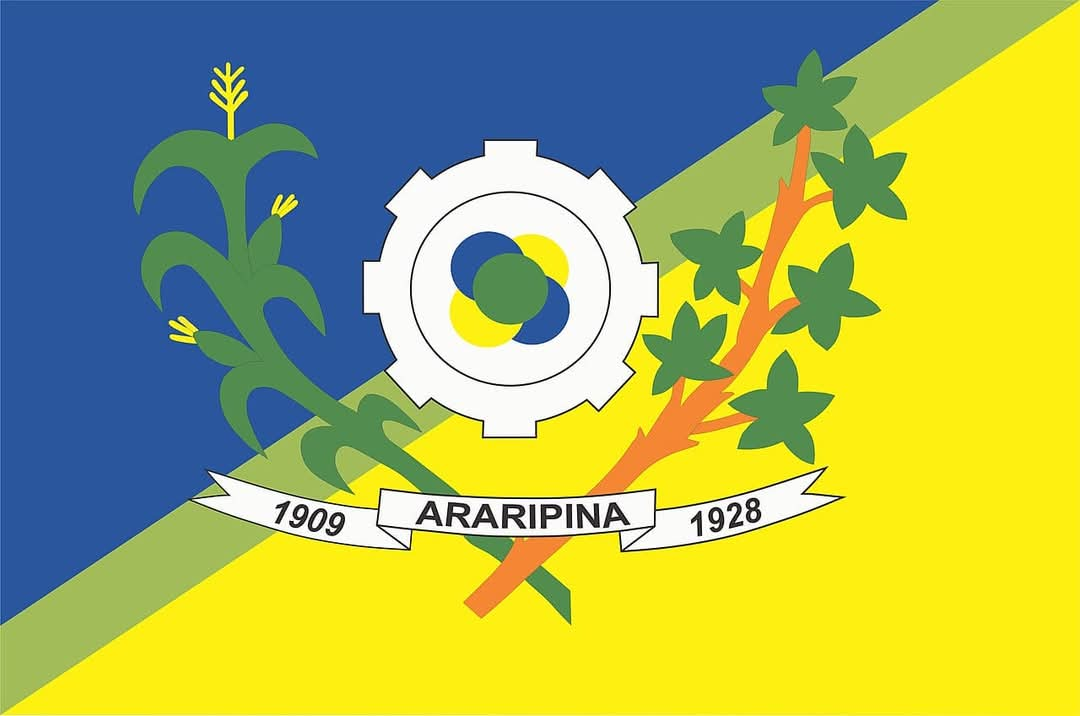
- Flag Coat of arms

- Location of Araripina in the State of Pernambuco
- Country: Brazil
- Region: Northeast
- State: Pernambuco
- Founded: Sep 11, 1928

Government
  - Mayor: Evilásio Mateus PDT

Area
  - Total: 203,739 km^{2} (78,664 sq mi)
- Elevation: 639 m (2,096 ft)

Population (2022 Census)
  - Total: 85,088
  - Estimate (2025): 90,504
  - Density: 0.41763/km^{2} (1.0817/sq mi)
- Time zone: UTC−3 (BRT)
- HDI (2010): 0.602 – medium
- Website: araripina.pe.gov.br

Araripina (Central northeastern portuguese pronunciation: [ɐɾɐɾiˈpinɐ]) is a Brazilian municipality in the state of Pernambuco. Has an estimated population in 2025 of 90,504 inhabitants according with IBGE. Total area of 1.847,5 km^{2} and is located in the state mesoregion of Sertão, at 622 meters above the sea level and 683 km West from the state capital, Recife.

The exploration of gypsum (95% of the Brazilian reserves) and calcarium is the base of the local economy and at the homonymous microregion.

== Geography ==
- State - Pernambuco
- Region - Sertao Pernambucano
- Boundaries - Ceará (N); Ouricuri (S); Ipubi and Trindade (E); Piauí (W)
- Area - 1847.5 km^{2}
- Elevation - 622 m
- Hydrography - Brigida River
- Vegetation - Caatinga
- Climate - Semi desertic ( Sertao)- hot and dry
- Annual average temperature - 22.4 c
- Main road - BR 232 and BR 316
- Distance to Recife - 683 km

== Economy ==
The main economic activities in Araripina are based in extraction of gypsum and no metallic minerals; and primary sector especially creation of goats, donkeys, pigs and farms with beans, manioc and corn. Araripina is located in the microregion with its name, which contains 95% of the Brazilian reserves of Gypsum.

=== Economic Indicators ===
| Population | GDP x(1000 R$). | GDP pc (R$) | PE |
|---|---|---|---|
| 79.877 | 255.578 | 3.368 | 0.43% |

Economy by Sector

2006

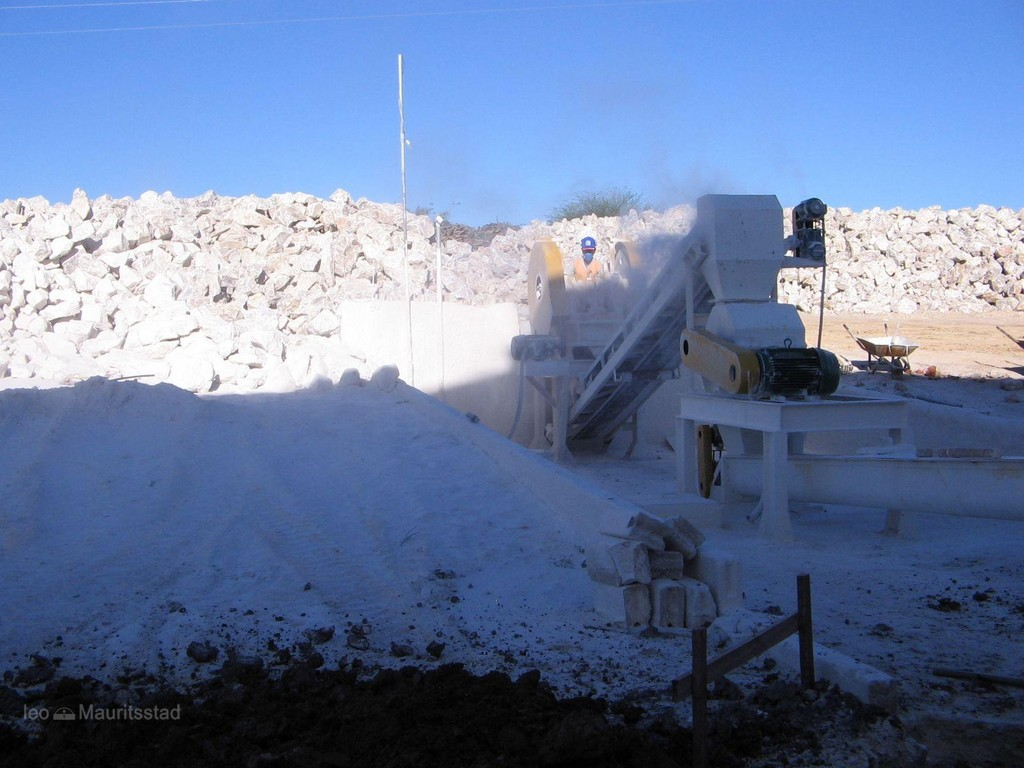
Gypsum exploration in Araripina Microregion

| Primary sector | Secondary sector | Service sector |
|---|---|---|
| 8.49% | 19.15% | 72.37% |

=== Health Indicators ===
| HDI (2000) | Hospitals (2007) | Hospitals beds (2007) | Children's Mortality every 1000 (2005) |
|---|---|---|---|
| 0.65 | 12 | 172 | 28.7 |

== Sports ==
The main sports in Araripina is football which is represented by Araripina Futebol Clube, currently playing the Campeonato Pernambucano. Their stadium is known as Chapadão do Araripe which has 5000 seats.

== Transportation ==
Araripina is served by Comte. Mairson C. Bezerra Airport.

== See also ==
- List of municipalities in Pernambuco
- Municipal Chamber of Araripina
