= Ipubi =

Municipality of Pernambuco, Brazil

- Municipality of Pernambuco, Brazil
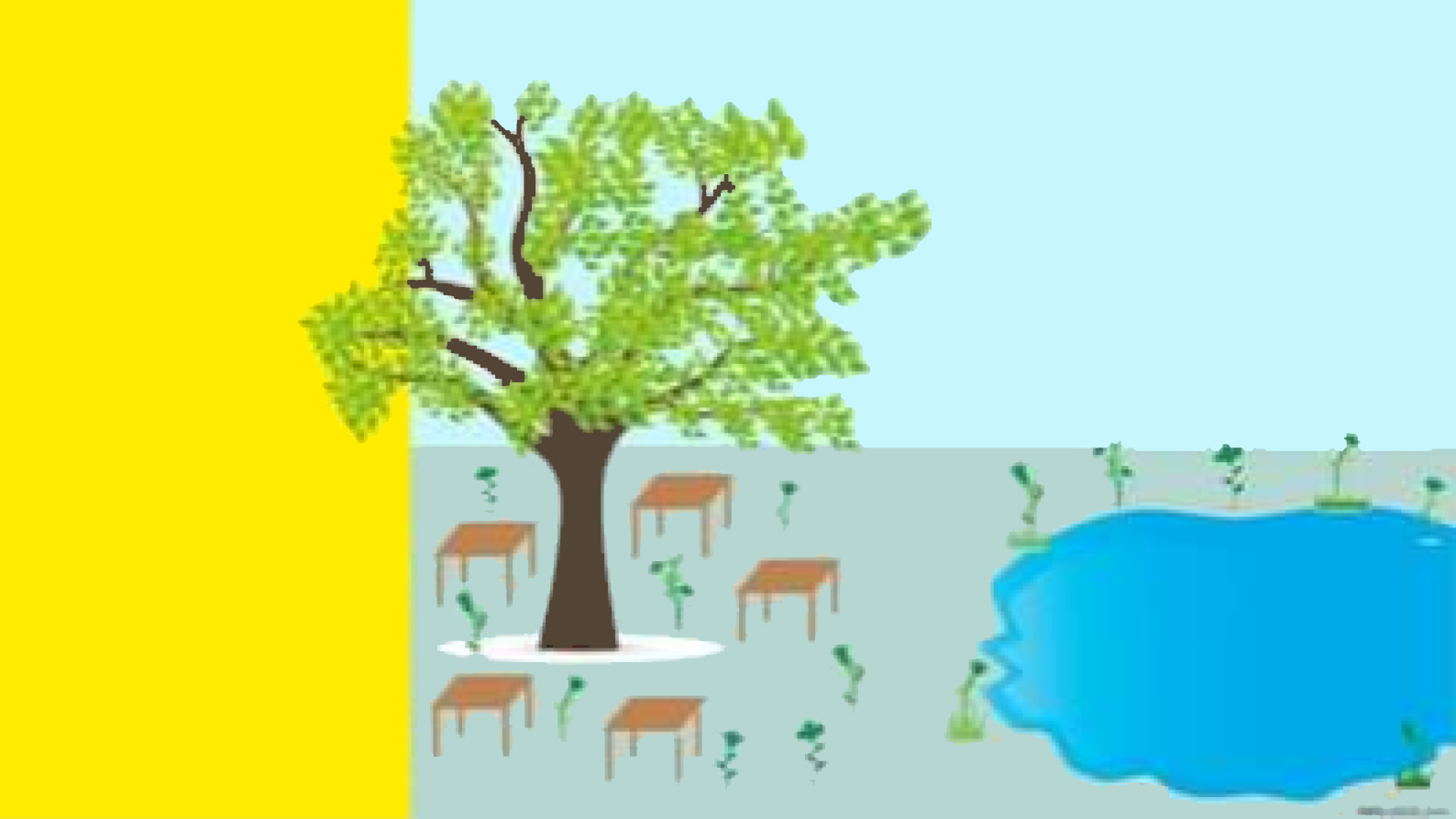
- Flag
- Etymology: Derived from the Tupi phrase ipu-obi, meaning green well or spring
- Location of Ipubi in Pernambuco

- Location within Brazil Location within South America
- Coordinates: 7°39′7″S 40°8′56″W
- Country: Brazil
- Region: Northeast
- State: Pernambuco
- Founded: 1 March 1962

Government
  - Mayor: João Marcos Siqueira Torres (PSD) (2025-2028)
  - Vice Mayor: Glauber Robson Gomes (PSD) (2025-2028)

Area
  - Total: 693.914 km^{2} (267.922 sq mi)
- Elevation: 535 m (1,755 ft)

Population (2022 Census)
  - Total: 29,009
  - Estimate (2025): 30,720
  - Density: 41.8/km^{2} (108/sq mi)
- Demonym: Ipubiense (Brazilian Portuguese)
- Time zone: UTC-03:00 (Brasília Time)
- Postal code: 56260-000, 56265-000, 56270-000
- HDI (2010): 0.550 – medium
- Website: ipubi.pe.gov.br

Ipubi (Central northeastern portuguese pronunciation: [ipuˈbi]) is a city in the state of Pernambuco, Brazil. The population in 2020, according with IBGE was 30,720 inhabitants and the total area is 693.91 km².

== Geography ==
- State - Pernambuco
- Region - Sertão Pernambucano
- Boundaries - Ceará state (N); Ouricuri (S); Bodocó (E); Araripina and Trindade (W).
- Area - 665.62 km²
- Elevation - 535 m
- Hydrography - Brigida River
- Vegetation - Caatinga
- Climate - semi arid - (Sertão) hot
- Annual average temperature - 24.8 c
- Distance to Recife - 665.8 km

== Economy ==
The main economic activities in Ipubi are based in industry and agribusiness, especially creation of cattle, sheep, pigss, goats, horses, chickens; and plantations of manioc (over 35,000 tons).

=== Economic indicators ===
Population	GDP x(1000 R$).	GDP pc (R$)	PE
27.353	79.446	3.089	0.132%

Economy by sector 2006

Primary sector	Secondary sector	Service sector
9.19%	16.43%	74.38%

=== Health indicators ===
HDI (2000)	Hospitals (2007)	Hospitals beds (2007)	Children's Mortality every 1000 (2005)
0.600	2	47	30.0

== See also ==
- List of municipalities in Pernambuco
