= Ouricuri River =

Coordinates: 9°01′S 41°02′W

Location
- Country: Brazil

Physical characteristics
- Source
  - location: Pernambuco state

The Ouricuri River is a river of Pernambuco state in Northeast Brazil.

== See also ==
- List of rivers of Pernambuco
