= Araripina Airport =

Comte. Mairson C. Bezerra Airport Aeroporto Comte. Mairson C. Bezerra
- IATA: JAW; ICAO: SNAB; LID: PE0009

Summary
- Airport type: Public
- Operator: GRU Airport (2025–Present)
- Serves: Araripina
- Time zone: BRT (UTC−03:00)
- Elevation AMSL: 740 m (2,430 ft)
- Coordinates: 07°35′11″S 040°32′07″W

Map
- Location in Brazil

Runways
Direction	Length		Surface
Direction	m	ft	Surface
13/31	1,247	4,091	Asphalt
- Sources: ANAC, DECEA

Comte. Mairson C. Bezerra Airport (IATA: JAW, ICAO: SNAB) is the airport serving Araripina, Brazil.

It is managed by GRU Airport.

== History ==
On November 27, 2025 GRU Airport won the concession to operate the airport.

== Airlines and destinations ==
Airlines	Destinations
Azul Conecta	Recife

== Access ==
The airport is located 6 km (4 mi) from downtown Araripina.

== See also ==
- List of airports in Brazil
