= Municipal Chamber of Araripina =

Municipal Chamber of Araripina Câmara Municipal de Araripina

Type
- Type: Unicameral

Structure
- Political groups: PSL (7); MDB (3); SD (3); Avante (1); PP (1)

Meeting place
- Casa Joaquim Pereira Lima, Araripina, Pernambuco

Website
- www.araripina.pe.leg.br

The Municipal Chamber of Araripina is the legislative body of the government of Araripina in the state of Pernambuco in Brazil.

It is unicameral and is composed of 15 councilors.

== Elections timeline ==
The first election was in 1947. It was followed by an election every four years through 1963. There was a five-year gap before the next election in 1968. Elections followed every four years through 1976. There was a six-year gap before the next election in 1982 and another before the election in 1988. Since 1988, elections have occurred every four years.

== 2021-2024 legislature ==
These councilors were elected in 2020 for the legislature of 2021 to 2024.

Number	Name	Party	Number of votes
17000	Kaligia Mateus	PSL	2447
17444	Camilla Sampaio	PSL	1654
17900	Roseilton	PSL	1453
15000	Aurismar Pinho	PSL	1.365
15678	Joao Doutor	MDB	1178
17999	Rodrigo Cobrinha	PSL	1139
70222	Silvanio Do Morais	Avante	1131
77777	Luciano Capitão	SD	1076
77888	João Dias	SD	1068
11111	Francisco Edivaldo	PP	1049
15555	Camila Modesto	MDB	978
17111	Doval da Saude	PSL	953
15444	Evandro Delmondes	MDB	945
77777	Divona	SD	737
20555	Luciano Belo	PSL	593
