= Moreilândia =

Municipality of Pernambuco, Brazil

- Municipality of Pernambuco, Brazil
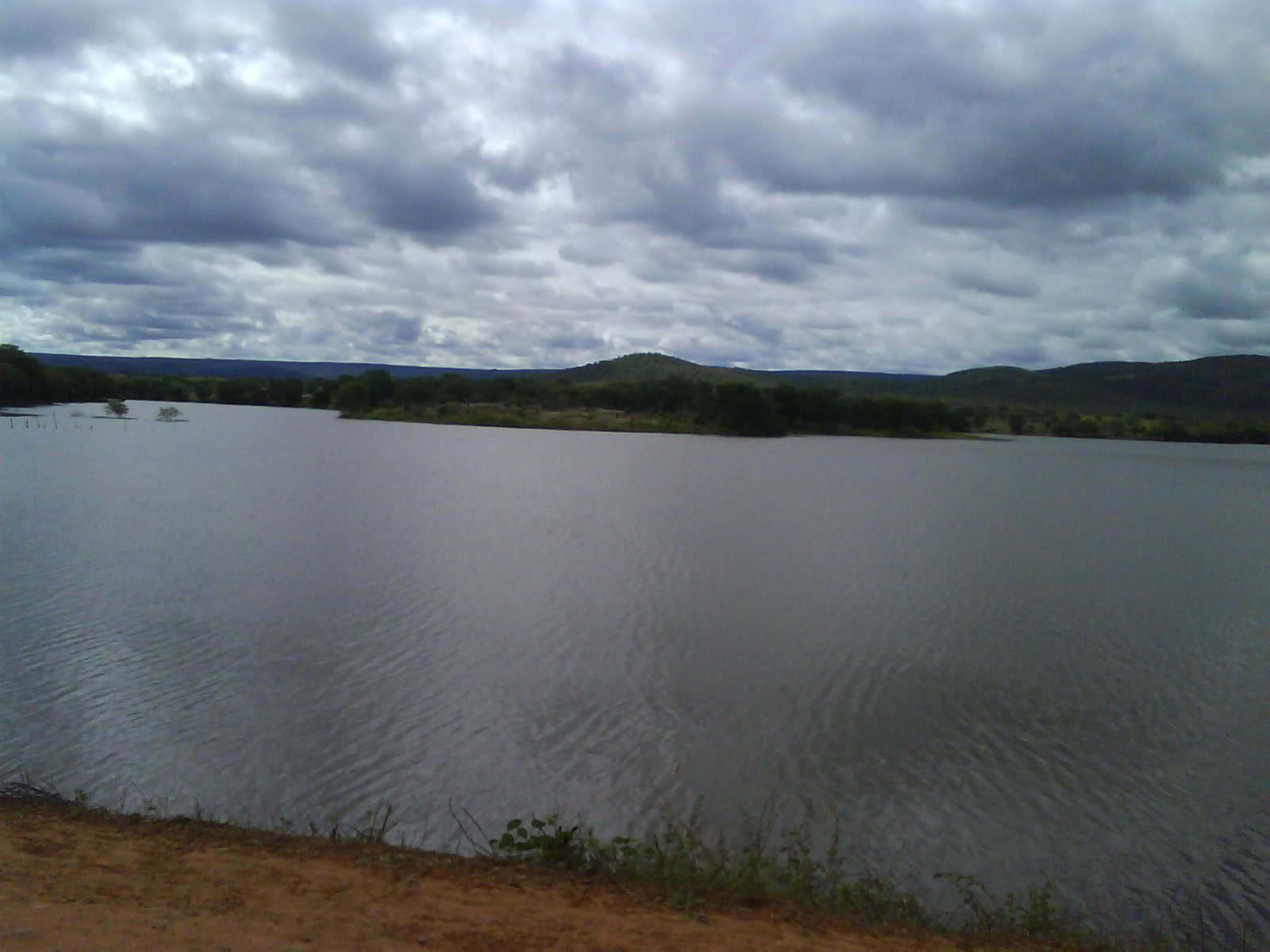
- Reservoir in Moreilândia

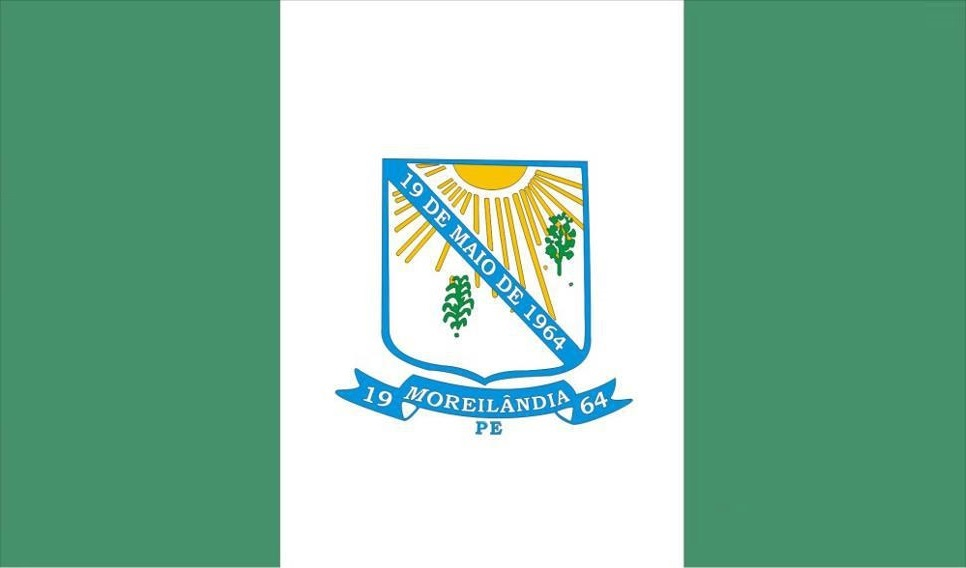
- Flag
- Etymology: Named after the Moreira family, who owned a farm in the area
- Location of Moreilândia in Pernambuco

- Location within Brazil Location within South America
- Coordinates: 7°37′51″S 39°33′3″W
- Country: Brazil
- Region: Northeast
- State: Pernambuco
- Founded: 19 May 1964

Government
  - Mayor: Vicente Teixeira Sampaio Neto (PSDB) (2025-2028)
  - Vice Mayor: Augusto Alves Peixoto Alencar (Republicanos) (2025-2028)

Area
  - Total: 404.287 km^{2} (156.096 sq mi)
- Elevation: 502 m (1,647 ft)

Population (2022 Census)
  - Total: 10,540
  - Estimate (2025): 10,839
  - Density: 26.07/km^{2} (67.5/sq mi)
- Demonym: Moreirense (Brazilian Portuguese)
- Time zone: UTC-03:00 (Brasília Time)
- Postal code: 56150-000, 56155-000
- HDI (2010): 0.600 – medium
- Website: moreilandia.pe.gov.br

Moreilândia (Central northeastern portuguese pronunciation: [moɾeˈlɐ̃djɐ]) is a city in the state of Pernambuco, Brazil. The population in 2020, according to IBGE was 10,839 inhabitants and the total area is 404.3 square kilometres (156.1 sq mi).

== Geography ==
- State - Pernambuco
- Region - Sertão Pernambucano
- Boundaries - Ceará state (N); Granito (S); Exu (W); Serrita (E)
- Area - 404.3 square kilometres (156.1 sq mi)
- Elevation - 502 m
- Hydrography - Brigida river
- Vegetation - Subperenifólia forest.
- Climate - semi-arid- hot and dry
- Annual average temperature - 24.7 °C
- Distance to Recife - 577 km

== Economy ==
The main economic activities in Moreilândia are based on agribusiness, especially livestock (e.g. cattle, sheep, pigs and goats raising); and crops such as corn and beans.

=== Economic Indicators ===
| Population | GDP x(1000 R$). | GDP pc (R$) | PE |
|---|---|---|---|
| 10.584 | 32.683 | 3.135 | 0.055% |

Economy by Sector 2006

| Primary sector | Secondary sector | Service sector |
|---|---|---|
| 14.29% | 7.75% | 77.96% |

=== Health Indicators ===
| HDI (2000) | Hospitals (2007) | Hospitals beds (2007) | Child Mortality per mille (2005) |
|---|---|---|---|
| 0.616 | 1 | 20 | 35.1 |

== See also ==
- List of municipalities in Pernambuco
