= Gurjaú River =

Location
- Country: Brazil

Physical characteristics
- Source
  - location: Pernambuco

The Gurjaú River is a river in the state of Pernambuco on the Atlantic coast of Brazil.

== See also ==
- List of rivers of Pernambuco
