= Pitanga =

Pitanga may refer to:

== People ==
- Antônio Pitanga (born 1939), Brazilian actor
- Camila Pitanga (born 1977), Brazilian actress

== Other ==
- Pitanga (album), an album by Mallu Magalhaes
- Pitanga, Paraná, a town in Brazil
- Eugenia uniflora, or pitanga, a plant in the family Myrtaceae, native to tropical America

== See also ==
- Pitanga River (disambiguation)
- Pitango, an Israeli venture capital fund
