= List of rivers of Pernambuco =

List of rivers in Pernambuco (Brazilian State).

The list is arranged by drainage basin from north to south, with respective tributaries indented under each larger stream's name and ordered from downstream to upstream. All rivers in Pernambuco drain to the Atlantic Ocean.

== By Drainage Basin ==
- Goiana River
  - Pitanga River
    - Siriji River
  - Orobó River
  - Tracunhaém River
- Zumbi River
- Paratibe River
- Beberibe River
- Capibaribe River
  - Tapacurã River
  - Goiatá River
- Tejipió River
- Jaboatão River
  - Pirapama River
  - Gurjaú River
- Ipojuca River
- Sirinhaém River
  - Tapirucu River
- Una River
  - Jacuípe River
  - Preto River
  - Palmares River
    - Piranji River
- Persinunga River
- Mundaú River
  - Inhumas River
- Paraíba River
- São Francisco River
  - Traipu River
  - Ipanema River
  - Moxotó River
  - Do Navio River
  - Pajeú River
  - Ouricuri River
  - Terra Nova River
  - Brigida River
    - São Pedro River
      - São João River
    - Gravatá River
  - Garça River
  - Pontal River

== Alphabetically ==
- Beberibe River
- Brigida River
- Capibaribe River
- Garça River
- Goiana River
- Goiatá River
- Gravatá River
- Gurjaú River
- Inhumas River
- Ipanema River
- Ipojuca River
- Jaboatão River
- Jacuípe River
- Moxotó River
- Mundaú River
- Do Navio River
- Orobó River
- Ouricuri River
- Pajeú River
- Palmares River
- Paraíba River
- Paratibe River
- Persinuga River
- Piranji River
- Pirapama River
- Pitanga River
- Pontal River
- Preto River
- São Francisco River
- São João River
- São Pedro River
- Siriji River
- Sirinhaém River
- Tapacurã River
- Tapirucu River
- Terra Nova River
- Tijipió River
- Tracunhaém River
- Traipu River
- Una River
- Zumbi River
