= Tejipió River =

Location
- Country: Brazil

Physical characteristics
- Source
  - location: Pernambuco state

The Tejipió River is a river of Pernambuco state in Brazil. The river forms the boundary between Recife and Jaboatão dos Guararapes.

== See also ==
- List of rivers of Pernambuco
