= Santa Filomena, Pernambuco =

Municipality of Pernambuco, Brazil

Santa Filomena
- Municipality of Pernambuco, Brazil
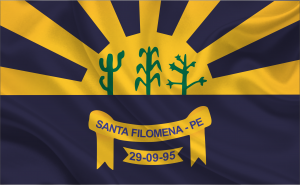
- Flag

- Location of Santa Filomena in Pernambuco

- Location within Brazil Location within South America
- Coordinates: 8°9′46″S 40°36′57″W
- Country: Brazil
- Region: Northeast
- State: Pernambuco
- Founded: 29 September 1995

Government
  - Mayor: Pedro Gildevan Coelho Melo (PSD) (2025-2028)
  - Vice Mayor: Rivaldino Reis de Barros (PSDB) (2025-2028)

Area
  - Total: 1,005.341 km^{2} (388.164 sq mi)
- Elevation: 630 m (2,070 ft)

Population (2022 Census)
  - Total: 12,106
  - Estimate (2025): 12,360
  - Density: 12.04/km^{2} (31.2/sq mi)
- Demonym: Filomense (Brazilian Portuguese)
- Time zone: UTC-03:00 (Brasília Time)
- Postal code: 56210-000
- HDI (2010): 0.533 – low
- Website: santafilomena.pe.gov.br

Santa Filomena (Central northeastern portuguese pronunciation: [ˈsɐ̃tɐ filɔˈmẽnɐ]) is a city in the state of Pernambuco, Brazil. The population in 2025, according with IBGE was 12,360 inhabitants and the total area is 1004.561 km².

== Geography ==
- State - Pernambuco
- Region - Sertão Pernambucano
- Boundaries - Ouricuri (N); Dormentes (S); Santa Cruz (E); Betânia do Piauí, Piauí state (W)
- Area - 1005.06 km²
- Elevation - 630 m
- Hydrography - Brigida and Garças rivers
- Vegetation - Caatinga
- Climate - semi arid- hot and dry
- Annual average temperature - 23.9 c
- Distance to Recife - 717 km

== Economy ==
The main economic activity in Santa Filomena is agribusiness, especially farming of cattle, sheep, pigs, goats, donkeys, chickens; and plantations of manioc and beans.

=== Economic Indicators ===
Population	GDP x(1000 R$).	GDP pc (R$)	PE
14.694	32.214	2.341	0.058%

Economy by Sector 2006

Primary sector	Secondary sector	Service sector
15.11%	7.69%	77.20%

=== Health Indicators ===
HDI (2000)	Hospitals (2007)	Hospitals beds (2007)	Children's Mortality every 1000 (2005)
0.582	---	---	27.9

== See also ==
- List of municipalities in Pernambuco
