= Dormentes =

City in Pernambuco, Brazil

- Municipality of Pernambuco, Brazil
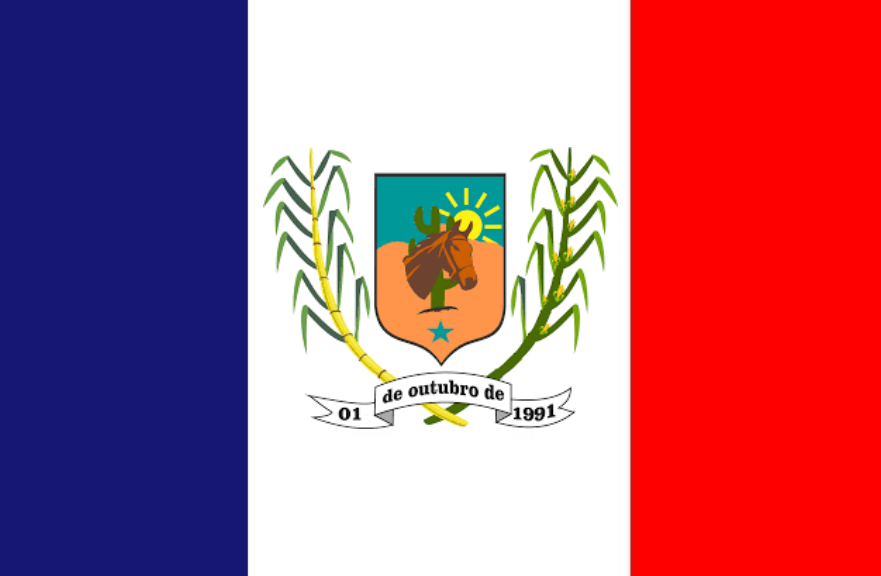
- Flag

- Location of Dormentes in Pernambuco

- Location within Brazil Location within South America
- Coordinates: 8°26′49″S 40°46′15″W
- Country: Brazil
- Region: Northeast
- State: Pernambuco
- Founded: 1 October 1991

Government
  - Mayor: Maria do Socorro Coelho de Sousa (PSB) (2025-2028)
  - Vice Mayor: Jurandir Ribeiro Torres (MDB) (2025-2028)

Area
  - Total: 1,539.052 km^{2} (594.231 sq mi)
- Elevation: 492 m (1,614 ft)

Population (2022 Census)
  - Total: 17,188
  - Estimate (2025): 17,850
  - Density: 11.17/km^{2} (28.9/sq mi)
- Demonym: Dormentense (Brazilian Portuguese)
- Time zone: UTC-03:00 (Brasília Time)
- Postal code: 56355-000
- HDI (2010): 0.589 – medium
- Website: dormentes.pe.gov.br

Dormentes (Central northeastern portuguese pronunciation: [dɔɦˈmẽti]) is a city in the Brazilian state of Pernambuco, 750 km away from the state's capital, Recife. The population in 2025, according with IBGE was 17,850 inhabitants and the area is 1543.7 km².

== Geography ==
- State - Pernambuco
- Region - São Francisco Pernambucano
- Boundaries - Santa Filomena (N); Petrolina (S); Santa Cruz and Lagoa Grande (E); Afrânio and Piauí state (W).
- Area - 1537.59 km²
- Elevation - 492 m
- Hydrography - Garças and Pontal rivers
- Vegetation - Caatinga
- Climate - Semi arid ( Sertão)
- Annual average temperature - 25.1 c
- Distance to Recife - 750 km

== Economy ==
The main economic activities in Dormentes are based in general commerce and agribusiness, especially creation of sheep (over 82,000 heads), goats (over 35,000), pigs, cattle, donkeys and mules; and plantations of beans, corn and sorgo.

=== Economic Indicators ===
Population	GDP x(1000 R$).	GDP pc (R$)	PE
16.462	51.985	3.333	0.084%

Economy by Sector 2006

Primary sector	Secondary sector	Service sector
12.52%	9.39%	78.09%

=== Health Indicators ===
HDI (2000)	Hospitals (2007)	Hospitals beds (2007)	Children's Mortality every 1000 (2005)
0.600	1	13	28.7

== See also ==
- List of municipalities in Pernambuco
