= Jaboatão River =

River in Brazil

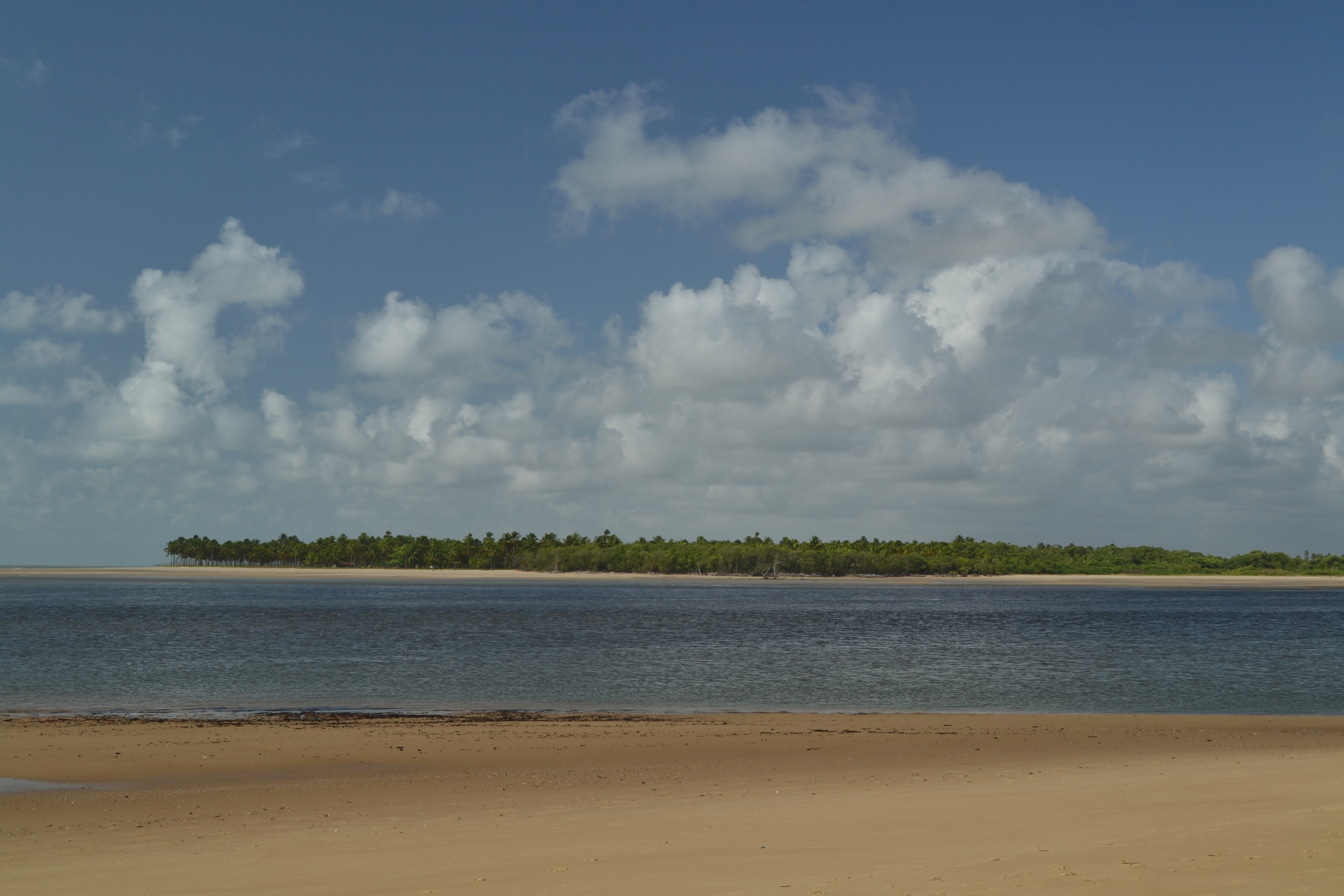

- Location of mouth

Location
- Country: Brazil
- State: Pernambuco

Physical characteristics
- Source
  - location: Pernambuco state
- Mouth
  - location: Atlantic Ocean
  - coordinates: 8°13′31″S 34°55′35″W
  - elevation: 0 m (0 ft)

The Jaboatão River is a river of Pernambuco state in western Brazil.

== See also ==
- List of rivers of Pernambuco
