= Palmares River =

River in Brazil

Location
- Country: Brazil

Physical characteristics
- Source
  - location: Pernambuco state

The Palmares River is a river of Pernambuco state in eastern Brazil.

== See also ==
- List of rivers of Pernambuco
