= Terra Nova, Pernambuco =

Municipality of Pernambuco, Brazil

Terra Nova
- Municipality
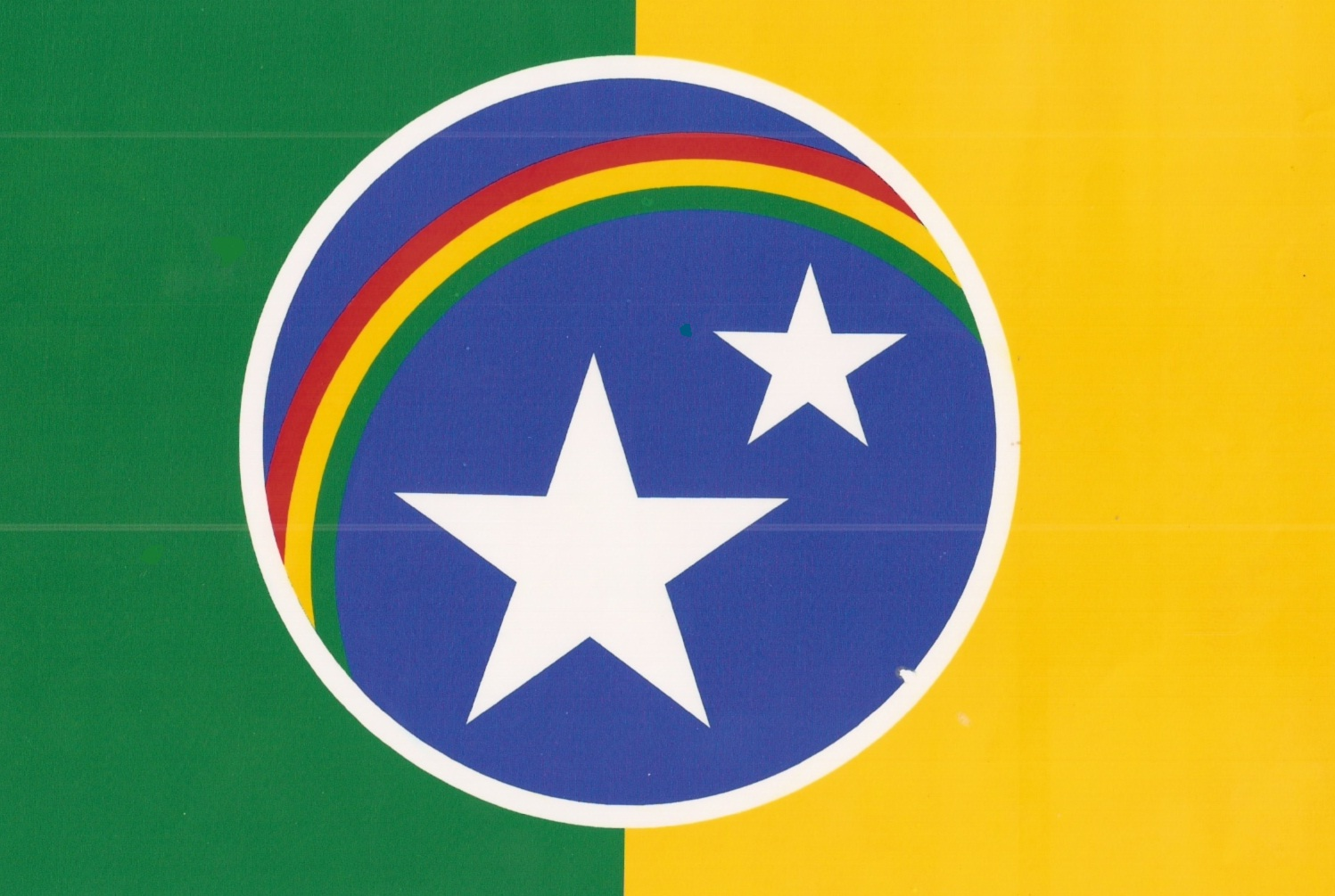
- Flag

- Location in Pernambuco

- Location in Brazil
- Coordinates: 8°13′48″S 39°22′33″W
- Country: Brazil
- Region: Northeast
- State: Pernambuco
- Creation of municipality: 1958

Government
  - Mayor: Aline Cleanne Filgueira Freire de Carvalho (Avante)

Area
  - Total: 318.71 km^{2} (123.05 sq mi)

Population (2022 Census)
  - Total: 8,920
  - Estimate (2025): 9,231
  - Density: 28.0/km^{2} (72.5/sq mi)
- Demonym: terra-novense
- Time zone: UTC−3 (BRT)

Terra Nova (Central northeastern portuguese pronunciation: [ˈtɛhɐ ˈnɔvɐ] or [ˈtɛhɐ ˈnɔhɐ]) (lit. 'new land') is a municipality in the Brazilian state of Pernambuco. 578.5 km from the state's capital, Recife, it is located in the semi-arid Sertão. The estimated population in 2025, according to the IBGE was 9,231 inhabitants and the total area is 318.709 km^{2}. The municipality was created in 1958 by state law.

Its current mayor (Brazilian Portuguese: prefeita) is Aline Freire of Avante, elected in 2020.

== Geography ==
- State - Pernambuco
- Region - São Francisco Pernambucano
- Boundaries - Serrita (North); Cabrobó (South); Salgueiro (East); Parnamirim (West)
- Area - 318.71 km^{2}
- Elevation - 363 m
- Drainage Basin - Terra Nova River
- Vegetation - Caatinga (xeric shrubland)
- Climate - Semi arid (Sertão) Köppen: BSh
- Annual average temperature - 26.0 °C
- Distance to Recife - 578.5 km

== Economy ==
The main economic activities in are agribusiness, especially the raising of goats, sheep, cattle, pigs, chickens and plantations of onions, tomatoes and rice.

=== Economic Indicators ===
Population (2010)	GDP in thousands of Reais (R$) (2013)	GDP per capita (R$) (2013)	Percent of Pernambuco GDP (2013)
9,278	53,136	5,359	0.05%

Economy by Sector (as of 2013)

Primary sector	Secondary sector	Service sector
9.03%	3.59%	87.38%

=== Health Indicators ===
HDI (2010)	Hospitals (2015)	Hospitals beds (2015)	Infant mortality rate per 1000 live births (2013)
0.599 (low)	1	11	13.42

== See also ==
- List of municipalities in Pernambuco
