= Siriji River =

Coordinates: 7°33′S 34°58′W

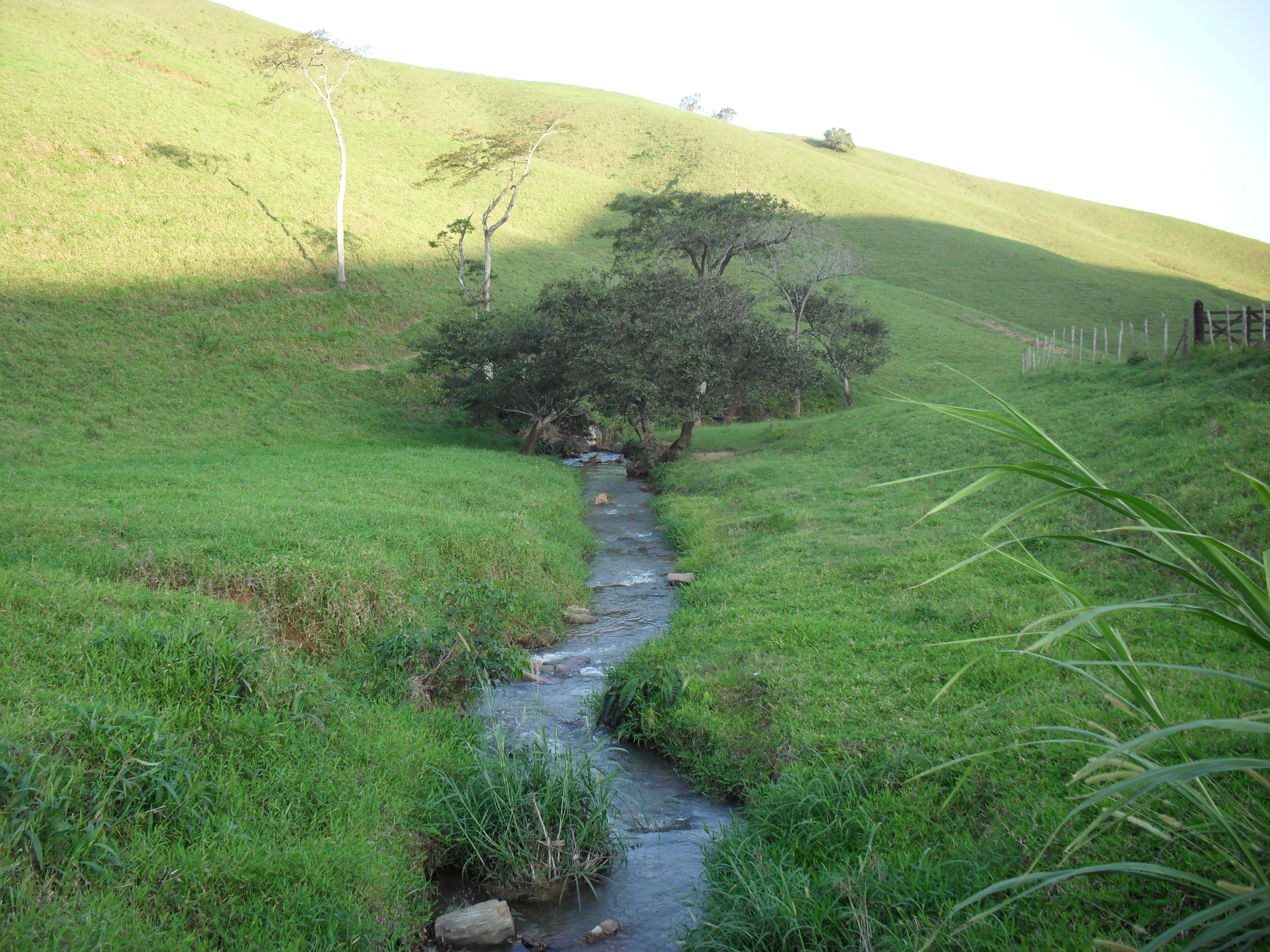

Location
- Country: Brazil

Physical characteristics
- Source
  - location: Pernambuco state

The Siriji River is a river of Pernambuco state in eastern Brazil.

== See also ==
- List of rivers of Pernambuco
