= Pirapama River =

River in Pernambuco, Brazil

Location
- Country: Brazil

Physical characteristics
- Source
  - location: Pernambuco state

The Pirapama River is a river of Pernambuco state in eastern Brazil. It passes through the city of Cabo de Santo Agostinho before reaching the ocean just south of Jaboatão dos Guararapes.

== See also ==
- List of rivers of Pernambuco
