= Tapacurá River =

Location
- Country: Brazil
- State: Pernambuco

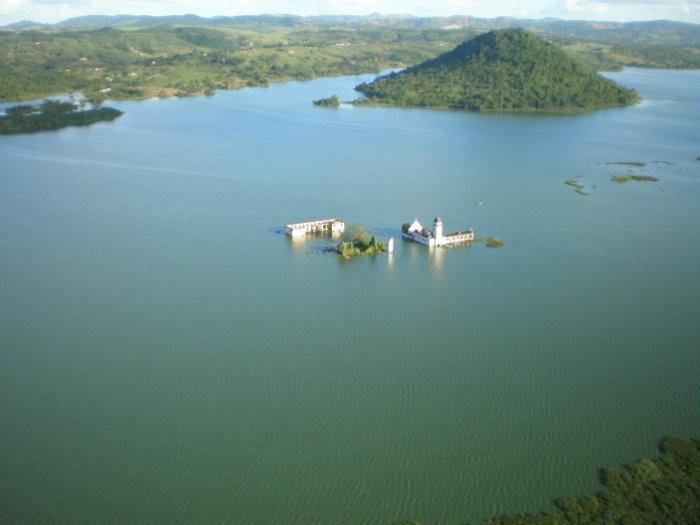

The Tapacurá River is a river of Pernambuco state in eastern Brazil.

== See also ==
- List of rivers of Pernambuco
