= Garça River =

Location
- Country: Brazil

Physical characteristics
- Source
  - location: Pernambuco state

The Garça River is a river of Pernambuco state in western Brazil.

== See also ==
- List of rivers of Pernambuco
