= Orocó =

Municipality of Pernambuco, Brazil

- City
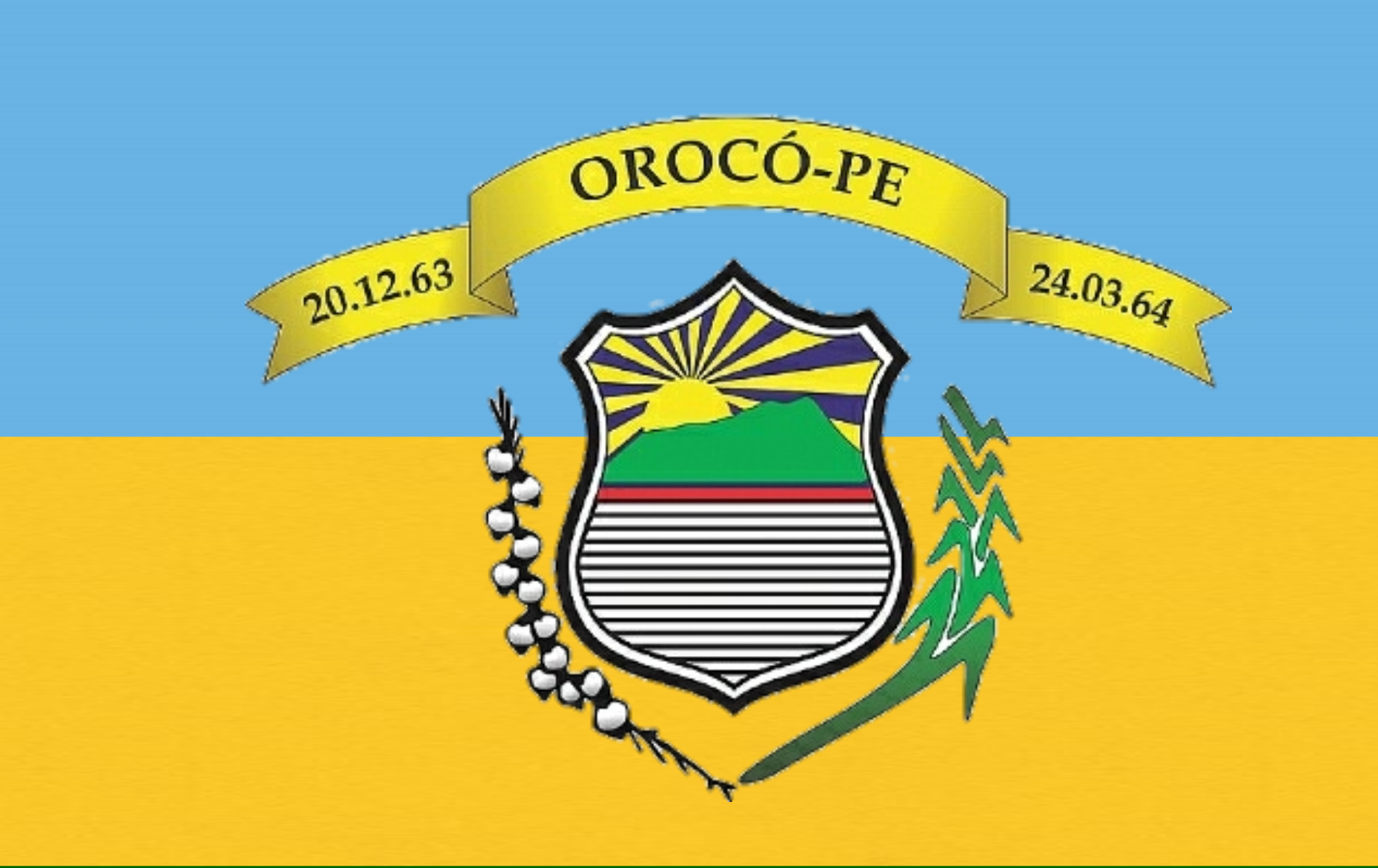
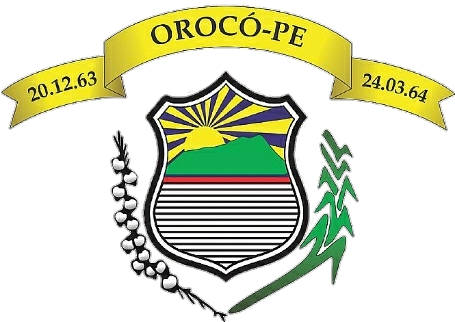
- Flag Coat of arms

- Orocó located in Brazil Map
- Coordinates: 08°37′12″S 39°36′07″W
- Country: Brazil
- State: Pernambuco
- Region: São Francisco Pernambuco

Area
  - Total: 554.75 km^{2} (214.19 sq mi)
- Elevation: 349 m (1,145 ft)

Population (2022 Census)
  - Total: 13,613
  - Estimate (2025): 14,129
- Time zone: UTC−3 (BRT)
- Average Temperature: 26.1 C

Orocó (Central northeastern portuguese pronunciation: [ɔɾɔˈkɔ]) is a city in the state of Pernambuco, Brazil. Its population in 2025, according with IBGE, is 14,129 and its area is 554.75 km^{2}.

== Geography ==
- State - Pernambuco
- Region - São Francisco Pernambucano
- Boundaries - Parnamirim (N); Bahia state (S); Cabrobó (E); Santa Maria da Boa Vista (W)
- Area - 554.75 km^{2}
- Elevation - 349 m
- Hydrography - Brigida River
- Vegetation - Caatinga hiperxerófila.
- Climate - Semi arid (Sertão) hot and dry
- Annual average temperature - 26.1 C
- Distance to Recife - 576 km

== Economy ==
The main economic activities in Orocó are based in general on commerce and agribusiness, especially farming of goats, sheep, cattle, donkeys and pigs; and plantations of onions, melons and bananas.

=== Economic Indicators ===
| Population | GDP x(1000 R$). | GDP pc (R$) | PE |
|---|---|---|---|
| 14.279 | 60.503 | 4.595 | 0.10% |

Economy by Sector (2006)

| Primary sector | Secondary sector | Service sector |
|---|---|---|
| 32.10% | 11.81% | 56.09% |

=== Health Indicators ===
| HDI (2000) | Hospitals (2007) | Hospitals beds (2007) | Children's Mortality every 1000 (2005) |
|---|---|---|---|
| 0.667 | 1 | 11 | 41.9 |

== See also ==
- List of municipalities in Pernambuco
