= Cabrobó =

Municipality of Pernambuco, Brazil

- Municipality
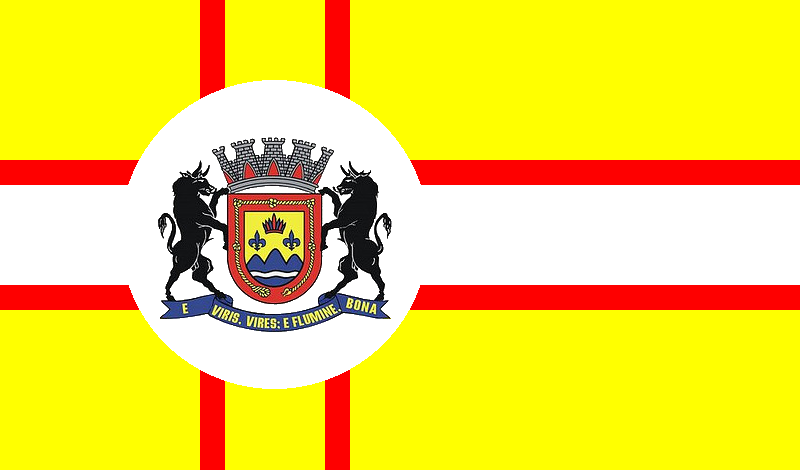
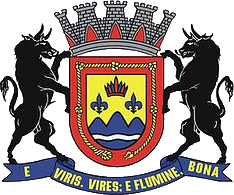
- Flag Coat of arms

- Location in Pernambuco

- Location in Brazil
- Coordinates: 08°30′51″S 38°16′36″W
- Country: Brazil
- Region: Southeast
- State: Pernambuco
- Mesoregion: São Francisco Pernambucano
- Microregion: Petrolina
- Incorporated (municipality): September 11, 1928

Government
  - Mayor: Marcilio Rodrigues Cavalcante

Area
  - Total: 1,657.706 km^{2} (640.044 sq mi)
- Elevation: 325 m (1,066 ft)

Population (2022 Census)
  - Total: 30,294
  - Estimate (2025): 31,762
  - Density: 8.71/km^{2} (22.6/sq mi)
- Demonym: Cabroboense
- Time zone: UTC−3 (BRT)
- CEP postal code: 56180-000
- Area code: 87
- HDI (2010): 0.623
- Website: cabrobo.pe.gov.br

Cabrobó (Central northeastern portuguese pronunciation: [kɐbɾɔˈbɔ]) is a city in the Brazilian state of Pernambuco, 536 km away from the state's capital, Recife. The city is located just to the north of a section of the São Francisco River that contains many archipelagos.

== History ==
The Truká people had historically occupied the Ilha da Assunção archipelago of the São Francisco River in Cabrobó municipality.

== Geography ==
- State - Pernambuco
- Region - Pernambucan San Francisco
- Boundaries - Terra Nova (N); Bahia state (S); Salgueiro and Belém de São Francisco (E); Orocó (W)
- Area - 1658.08 km^{2}
- Elevation - 325 m
- Hydrography - Terra Nova River
- Vegetation - Caatinga hiperxerófila.
- Climate - Semi arid (Sertão) hot and dry
- Annual average temperature - 26.2 c
- Distance to Recife - 536 km

== Economy ==
The main economic activities in Cabrobó are based in general commerce and agribusiness, especially farming of goats, sheep, cattle, pigs; and plantations of onions, cannabis, water melons and rice.

=== Economic Indicators ===
Population	GDP x(1000 R$).	GDP pc (R$)	PE
31,762	122.201	4.236	0.20%

Economy by Sector 2006

Primary sector	Secondary sector	Service sector
14.77%	12.86%	72.37%

=== Health Indicators ===
HDI (2000)	Hospitals (2007)	Hospitals beds (2007)	Children's Mortality every 1000 (2005)
0.677	1	45	32.3

== See also ==
- List of municipalities in Pernambuco
