= Lagoa Grande, Pernambuco =

Municipality of Pernambuco, Brazil

Lagoa Grande
- Municipality of Pernambuco, Brazil
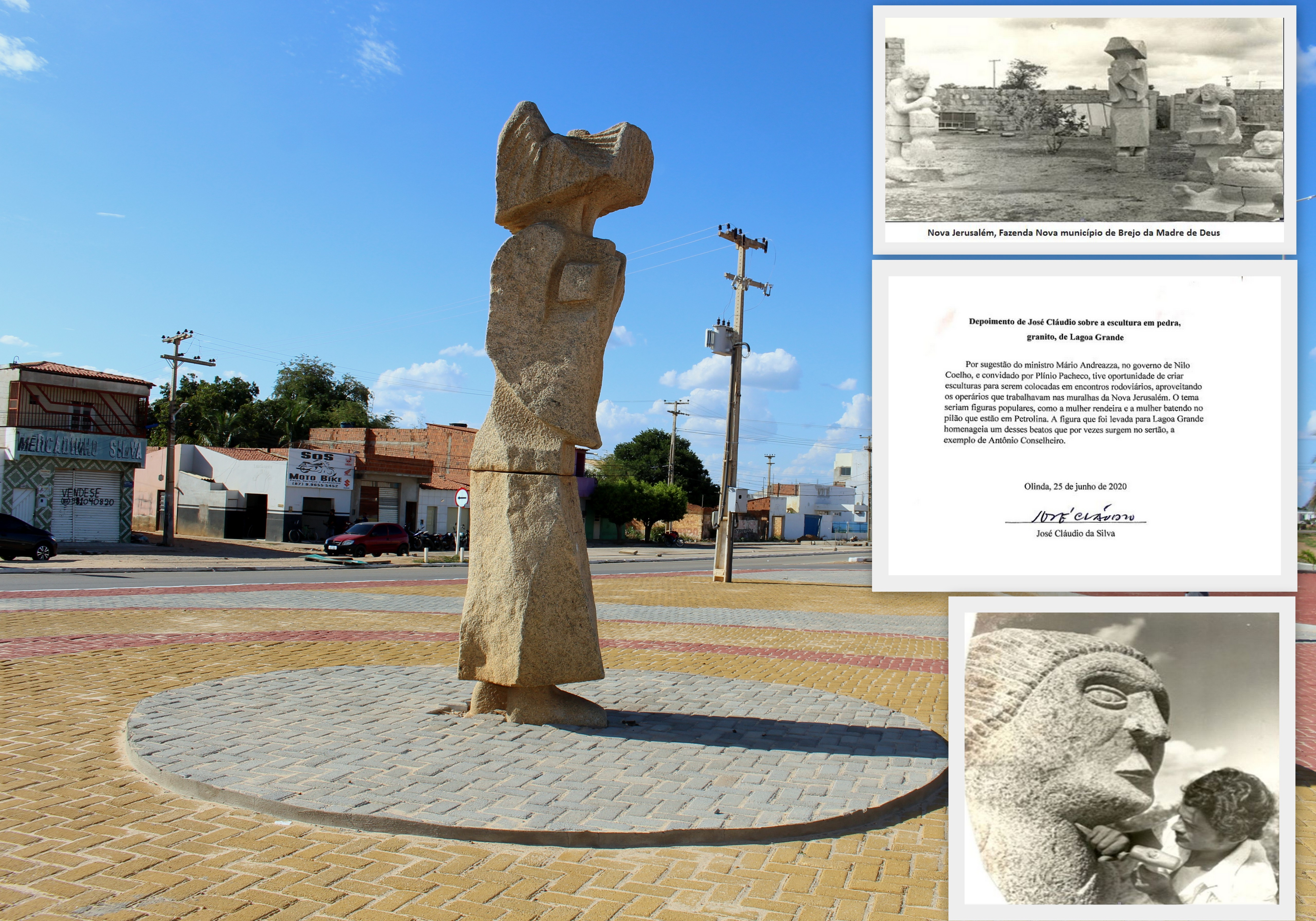
- Statue of the Blessed of the Roundabout in Lagoa Grande

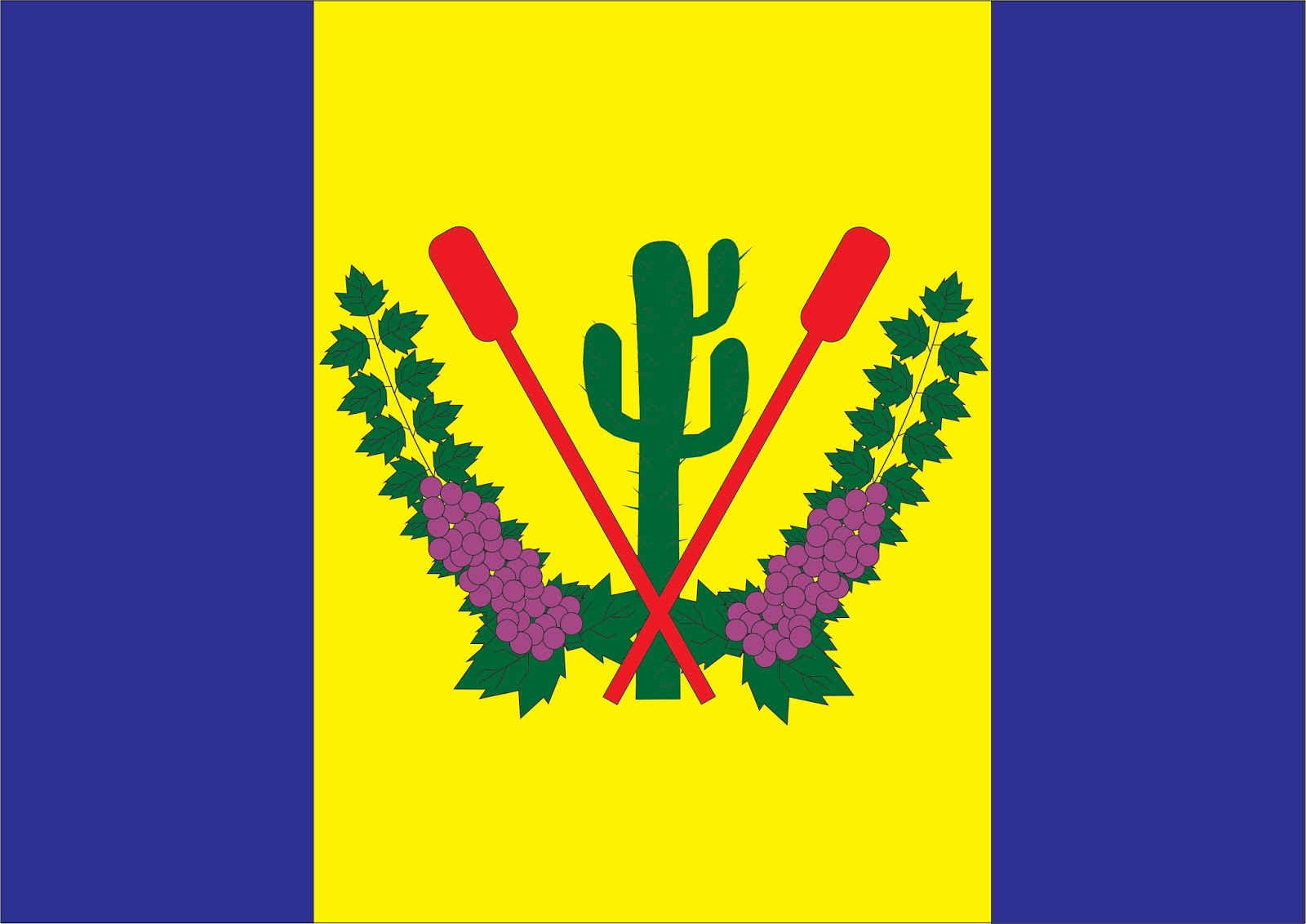
- Flag

- Location of Lagoa Grande in Pernambuco

- Location within Brazil Location within South America
- Coordinates: 8°59′49″S 40°16′19″W
- Country: Brazil
- Region: Northeast
- State: Pernambuco
- Founded: 16 June 1995

Government
  - Mayor: Ana Catharina Garziera Moreno (PSB) (2025-2028)
  - Vice Mayor: Olavo Marques de Sá (PSD) (2025-2028)

Area
  - Total: 1,850.070 km^{2} (714.316 sq mi)
- Elevation: 345 m (1,132 ft)

Population (2022 Census)
  - Total: 24,088
  - Estimate (2025): 24,951
  - Density: 13.02/km^{2} (33.7/sq mi)
- Demonym: Lagoa-grandense (Brazilian Portuguese)
- Time zone: UTC-03:00 (Brasília Time)
- Postal code: 56395-000, 56396-000
- HDI (2010): 0.597 – medium
- Website: lagoagrande.pe.gov.br

Lagoa Grande (Central northeastern portuguese pronunciation: [lɐˈɡoɐ ˈɡɾɐ̃di]) is a city in the Brazilian state of Pernambuco, 665 km away from the state's capital, Recife. The population in 2025, according to IBGE was 24,951 inhabitants, and the total area is 1844.5 km^{2}.

== Geography ==
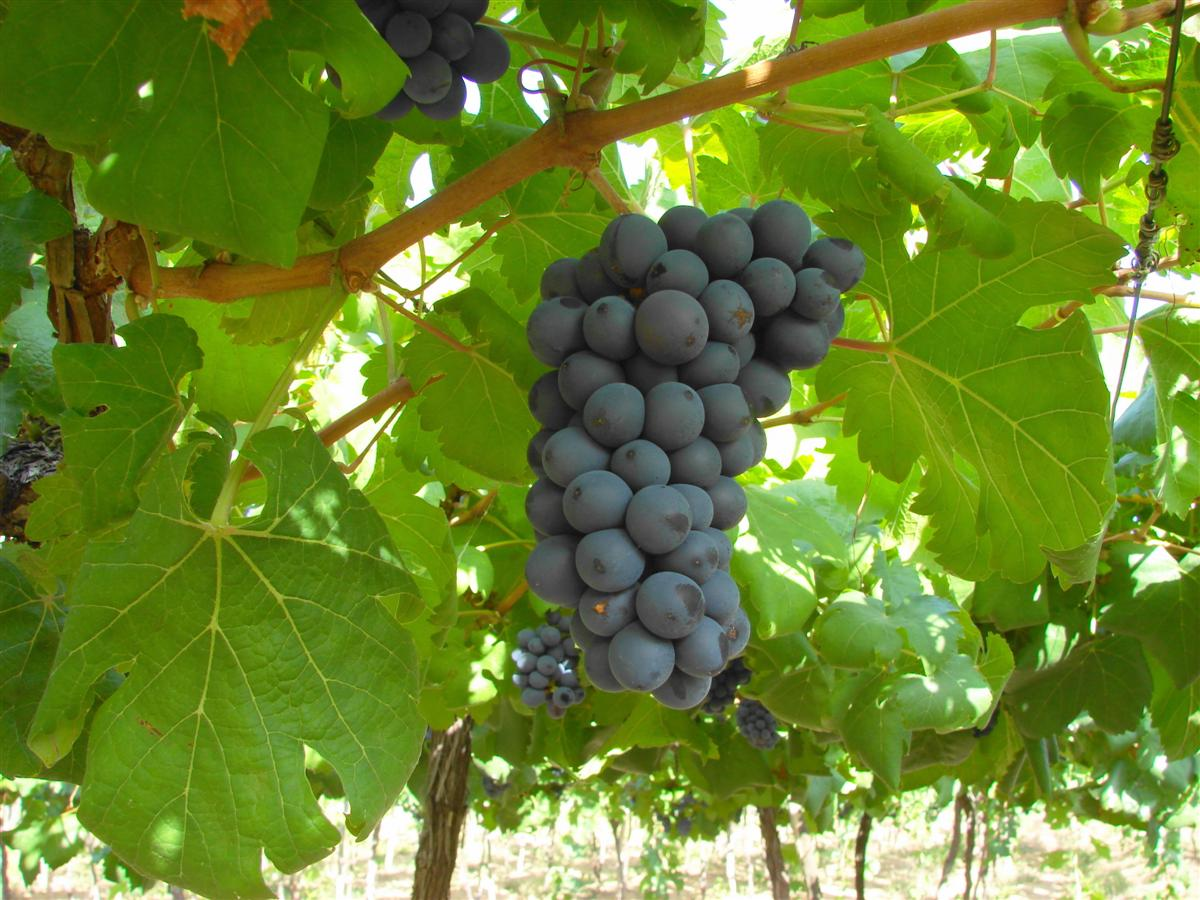
Grapes in São Francisco Valley, between Lagoa Grande, Petrolina and Juazeiro

- State – Pernambuco
- Region – São Francisco Pernambucano
- Boundaries – Santa Cruz (N); Bahia state (S); Santa Maria da Boa Vista (E); Petrolina and Dormentes (W)
- Area – 1852.19 km^{2}
- Elevation – 300 m
- Hydrography – Garças and Pontal rivers
- Vegetation – Caatinga
- Climate – Semi arid (Sertão) hot
- Distance to Recife – 665.8 km

== Economy ==
The main economic activities in Lagoa Grande are based on commerce and agribusiness, especially farming of goats, sheep, cattle, pigs, donkeys; and plantations of grapes (more than 32400 tons), tomatoes, onions, guava, and mangoes.

=== Economic indicators ===
Population	GDP x(1000 R$).	GDP pc (R$)	PE
22.408	163.859	7.757	0.27%

Economy by Sector 2006

Primary sector	Secondary sector	Service sector
48.85%	7.05%	44.10%

=== Health Indicators ===
HDI (2000)	Hospitals (2007)	Hospitals beds (2007)	Children's Mortality every 1000 (2005)
0.627	1	18	29.1

== See also ==
- List of municipalities in Pernambuco
