= Santa Cruz, Pernambuco =

Municipality of Pernambuco, Brazil

Santa Cruz
- Municipality of Pernambuco, Brazil
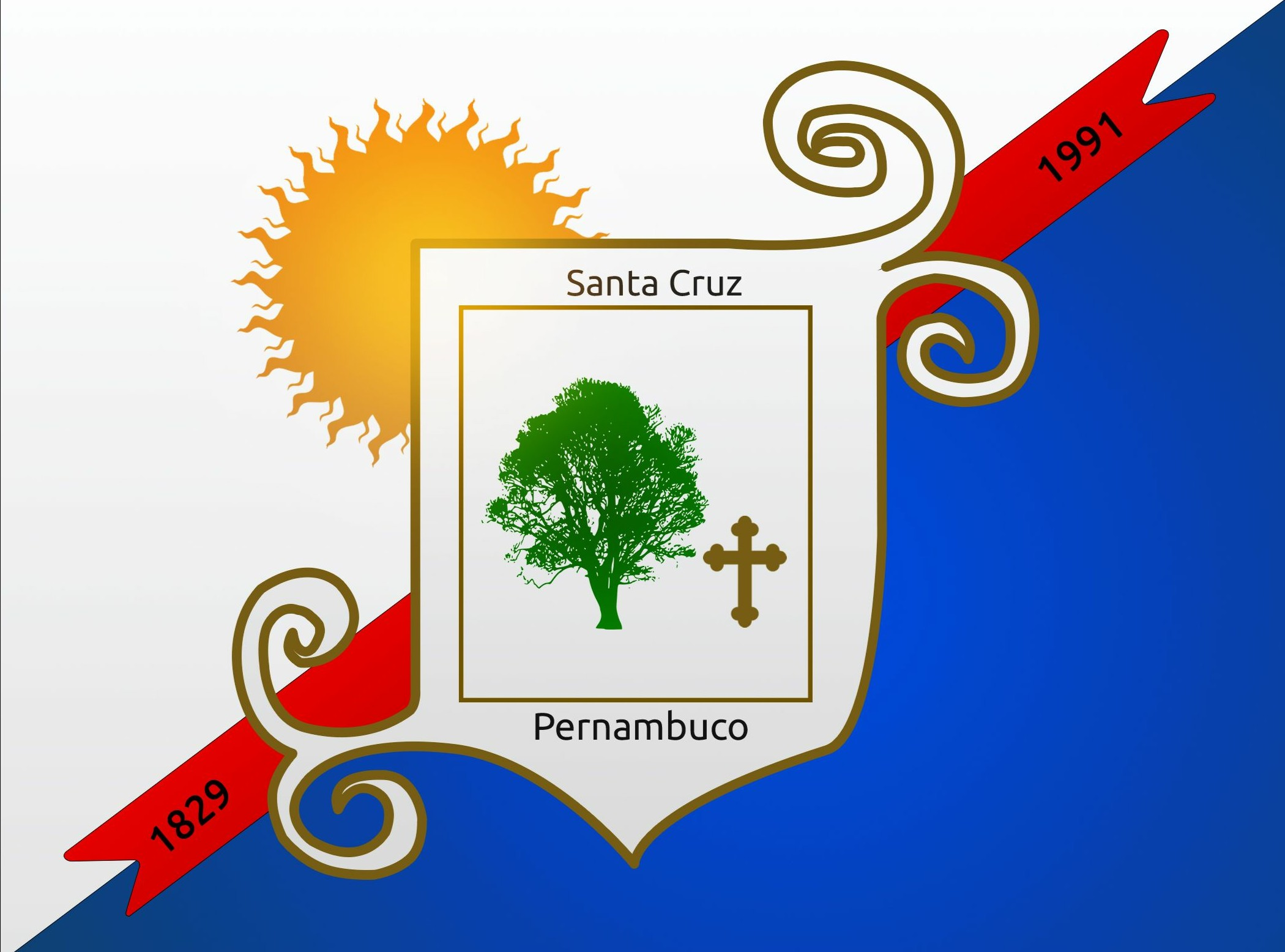
- Flag

- Location of Santa Cruz in Pernambuco

- Location within Brazil Location within South America
- Coordinates: 8°14′24″S 40°20′9″W
- Country: Brazil
- Region: Northeast
- State: Pernambuco
- Founded: 10 January 1991

Government
  - Mayor: Adegildo Guimaraes Soares (Avante) (2025-2028)
  - Vice Mayor: Eracildo Barbosa Teixeira (Avante) (2025-2028)

Area
  - Total: 1,245.983 km^{2} (481.077 sq mi)
- Elevation: 515 m (1,690 ft)

Population (2022 Census)
  - Total: 13,841
  - Estimate (2025): 14,342
  - Density: 11.11/km^{2} (28.8/sq mi)
- Demonym: Santacruzense (Brazilian Portuguese)
- Time zone: UTC-03:00 (Brasília Time)
- Postal code: 56215-000
- HDI (2010): 0.549 – low
- Website: santacruz.pe.gov.br

Santa Cruz (Central northeastern portuguese pronunciation: [ˈsɐ̃tɐ ˈkɾujs]) is a city in the state of Pernambuco, Brazil. The population in 2025, according with IBGE was 14,342 and the area is 1,246.181 km^{2} (481.153 sq mi).

== Geography ==
- State - Pernambuco
- Region - Sertão Pernambucano
- Boundaries - Ouricuri(N); Lagoa Grande(S); Parnamirim and Santa Maria da Boa Vista(E); Dormentes and Santa Filomena(W)
- Area - 1255.9 km^{2}
- Elevation - 515 m
- Hydrography - Brigida and Garças rivers
- Vegetation - Caatinga Hiperxerófila
- Climate - semi arid
- Annual average temperature - 25.0 c
- Distance to Recife - 731 km

== Economy ==
The main economic activities in Santa Cruz are based in agribusiness, especially creation of goats, cattle, sheep, and plantations of tomatoes and manioc.

=== Economic Indicators ===
Population	GDP x(1000 R$).	GDP pc (R$)	PE
12.942	35.331	2.589	0.06%

Economy by Sector 2006

Primary sector	Secondary sector	Service sector
18.22%	7.44%	74.34%

=== Health Indicators ===
HDI (2000)	Hospitals (2007)	Hospitals beds (2007)	Children's Mortality every 1000 (2005)
0.579	1	8	43.6

== See also ==
- List of municipalities in Pernambuco
