= Ouricuri =

Municipality of Pernambuco, Brazil

- Municipality of Pernambuco, Brazil
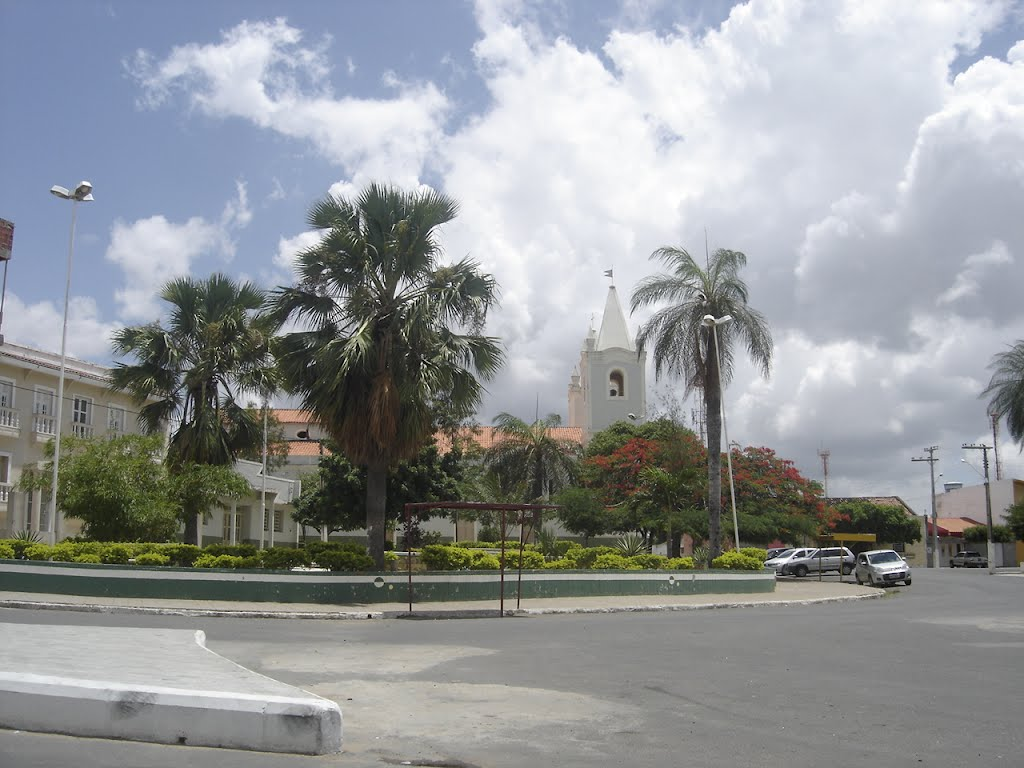
- Church of San Sebastian in Ouricuri

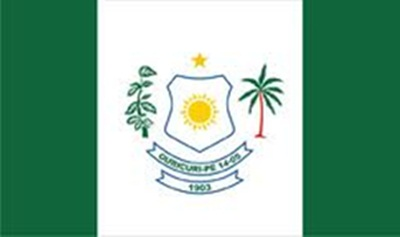
- Flag Coat of arms

- Location of Ouricuri in Pernambuco

- Location within Brazil Location within South America
- Coordinates: 7°52′58″S 40°4′55″W
- Country: Brazil
- Region: Northeast
- State: Pernambuco
- Founded: 14 May 1903

Government
  - Mayor: Francisco Victor Ramos Coelho (Republicanos) (2025-2028)
  - Vice Mayor: Francisco Assis de Matos Alencar (PT) (2025-2028)

Area
  - Total: 2,381.570 km^{2} (919.529 sq mi)
- Elevation: 451 m (1,480 ft)

Population (2022 Census)
  - Total: 65,245
  - Estimate (2025): 68,489
  - Density: 27.4/km^{2} (71/sq mi)
- Demonym: Ouricuriense (Brazilian Portuguese)
- Time zone: UTC-03:00 (Brasília Time)
- Postal code: 56200-000, 56203-000, 56205-000
- HDI (2010): 0.572 – medium
- Website: ouricuri.pe.gov.br

Ouricuri (Central northeastern portuguese pronunciation: [oɾikuˈɾi]) is a city in the state of Pernambuco, Brazil. It is located in the mesoregion of Sertão Pernambucano. According to the IBGE, in 2025, Ouricuri has a total area of 2,381 square kilometers and had an estimated population of 68,489 inhabitants .

== Geography ==
- State - Pernambuco
- Region - Sertão Pernambucano
- Boundaries - Araripina, Trindade and Ipubi (N), Santa Cruz and Santa Filomena (S), Parnamirim and Bodocó (E), Piauí state (W)
- Area - 2,423 km^{2}
- Elevation - 451 m
- Hydrography - Brigida River
- Vegetation - Caatinga
- Climate - Semi-arid (Sertao) hot and dry
- Annual average temperature - 25.5 c
- Main road - BR 232 and BR 316
- Distance to Recife - 621 km

=== Climate ===
Climate data for Ouricuri (1981–2010)
Month	Jan	Feb	Mar	Apr	May	Jun	Jul	Aug	Sep	Oct	Nov	Dec	Year
Mean daily maximum °C (°F)	31.9 (89.4)	31.2 (88.2)	31.1 (88.0)	30.3 (86.5)	30.4 (86.7)	29.6 (85.3)	29.6 (85.3)	30.8 (87.4)	32.8 (91.0)	34.4 (93.9)	34.6 (94.3)	33.4 (92.1)	31.7 (89.1)
Daily mean °C (°F)	26.1 (79.0)	25.9 (78.6)	25.6 (78.1)	25.1 (77.2)	24.9 (76.8)	23.9 (75.0)	23.6 (74.5)	24.5 (76.1)	26.2 (79.2)	28.0 (82.4)	28.2 (82.8)	27.7 (81.9)	25.8 (78.4)
Mean daily minimum °C (°F)	21.9 (71.4)	21.7 (71.1)	21.7 (71.1)	21.2 (70.2)	20.6 (69.1)	19.5 (67.1)	18.9 (66.0)	19.2 (66.6)	20.4 (68.7)	22.1 (71.8)	22.9 (73.2)	22.9 (73.2)	21.1 (70.0)
Average precipitation mm (inches)	105.3 (4.15)	104.7 (4.12)	156.5 (6.16)	105.3 (4.15)	37.7 (1.48)	8.2 (0.32)	11.3 (0.44)	4.1 (0.16)	3.2 (0.13)	13.3 (0.52)	29.5 (1.16)	86.7 (3.41)	665.8 (26.21)
Average precipitation days (≥ 1.0 mm)	6.5	6.5	9.3	6.8	4.4	2.5	3.0	1.0	0.4	0.9	2.8	4.7	48.8
Average relative humidity (%)	67.9	73.2	75.4	76.2	70.3	66.0	63.0	56.2	49.3	48.2	51.7	57.9	62.9
Average dew point °C (°F)	19.7 (67.5)	20.4 (68.7)	21.0 (69.8)	20.8 (69.4)	19.7 (67.5)	18.0 (64.4)	16.8 (62.2)	16.0 (60.8)	15.8 (60.4)	16.8 (62.2)	17.8 (64.0)	18.8 (65.8)	18.5 (65.3)
Mean monthly sunshine hours	215.3	183.7	208.6	204.8	199.4	191.4	204.9	255.3	264.7	286.8	258.2	249.0	2,722.1
Source 1: NOAA (precipitation and sun 1991–2020)
Source 2: Instituto Nacional de Meteorologia

== Economy ==
The main economic activities in Ouricuri are based in extraction of gypsum and no metallic minerals, and primary sector especially creation of goats, donkeys, pigs and farms with beans, manioc and corn. Ouricuri is located in the micro region of Araripina which contains 95% of the Brazilian reserves of Gypsum.

=== Economic Indicators ===
Population	GDP x(1000 R$).	GDP pc (R$)	PE
66.978	200.880	3.186	0.33%

Economy by Sector 2006

Primary sector	Secondary sector	Service sector
6.51%	17.42%	76.07%

=== Health Indicators ===
HDI (2000)	Hospitals (2007)	Hospitals beds (2007)	Children's Mortality every 1000 (2005)
0.614	2	165	27.4

The institutions that is responsible for public healthcare in Ouricuri and region of the Araripe are; Municipal Health Secretary of Ouricuri (SMSO), Intermunicipal Health Consortium of Pernambuco (CIAPE)

== See also ==
- List of municipalities in Pernambuco
