= Pontal River =

Coordinates: 9°03′37″S 40°12′30″W

Location
- Country: Brazil

Physical characteristics
- Source
  - location: Pernambuco state

The Pontal River is a river of Pernambuco state in western Brazil.

== See also ==
- List of rivers of Pernambuco
