= Terra Nova River =

Coordinates: 48°40′18″N 54°00′05″W

The Terra Nova River is a river in the province of Newfoundland and Labrador, Canada.

It drains an area in the centre of the island of Newfoundland, discharging into Bonavista Bay at Glovertown.

The Terra Nova River passes through the northern end of Terra Nova National Park, which derives its name from the river. The river also has a healthy run of Atlantic Salmon.

== See also ==
- List of rivers of Newfoundland and Labrador
