= Brigida River =

Location
- Country: Brazil

Physical characteristics
- Source
  - location: Pernambuco state
- Mouth: São Francisco River
  - location: East of Orocó
  - coordinates: 8°35′07″S 39°32′39″W

The Brigida River is a river of Pernambuco state in western Brazil.

== See also ==
- List of rivers of Pernambuco
