= Itapetim =

Municipality of Pernambuco, Brazil

- Municipality
- The Municipality of Itapetim
- Flag Coat of arms

- Location within Brazil
- Coordinates: 07°22′40″S 37°11′24″W
- Country: Brazil
- Region: Northeast
- State: Pernambuco
- Founded: March 1, 1893

Government
  - Mayor: Aline Karina (PSB)

Area
  - Total: 411.9 km^{2} (159.0 sq mi)
- Elevation: 637 m (2,090 ft)

Population (2022 Census)
  - Total: 13,791
  - Estimate (2025): 14,236
  - Density: 33.47/km^{2} (86.7/sq mi)
- Time zone: UTC−3 (BRT)
- HDI (2000): 0.620 – medium

Itapetim (Central northeastern portuguese pronunciation: [itɐpeˈtĩ]) is the northernmost city in the Brazilian state of Pernambuco. The population in 2025, according with IBGE was 14,236 inhabitants and the total area is 411.87 km^{2}.

== Geography ==
Itapetim is located in the Sertão sub-region, and has the northenmost point in the mainland Pernambuco: The village of Lagoa de Dentro, also called Fava de Cheiro (2010 IBGE census) or Tombador (2022 IBGE census). The municipality of Itapetim is formed by three main districts: the headquarters district, São Vicente and Piedade do Ouro. (Note: Piedade do Ouro is classified as a district by the Itapetim Municipal Prefecture, but it is not by IBGE)

Itapetim borders Paraíba state (N and E); São José do Egito (S); São José do Egito and Brejinho (W). According to the 2022 IBGE census, its area is 411.9 km². Itapetim also has an elevation of 637 meters and is crossed by the Pajeú River. It has a semi-arid and its biome is the Caatinga (xeric shrublands).

Itapetim

Climate chart (precipitation, max. and min. temperature)
J	F	M	A	M	J	J	A	S	O	N	D
64 31 20	58 30 20	87 31 21	64 30 20	36 29 20	24 28 19	13 28 18	7 29 18	2 31 18	6 32 19	7 32 20	21 32 20
- █ Average max. and min. temperatures in °C
- █ Precipitation totals in mm
- Source: Climatempo and Meteoblue
Imperial conversion
J	F	M	A	M	J	J	A	S	O	N	D
2.5 88 68	2.3 86 68	3.4 88 70	2.5 86 68	1.4 84 68	0.9 82 66	0.5 82 64	0.3 84 64	0.1 88 64	0.2 90 66	0.3 90 68	0.8 90 68
- █ Average max. and min. temperatures in °F
- █ Precipitation totals in inches

== Economy ==
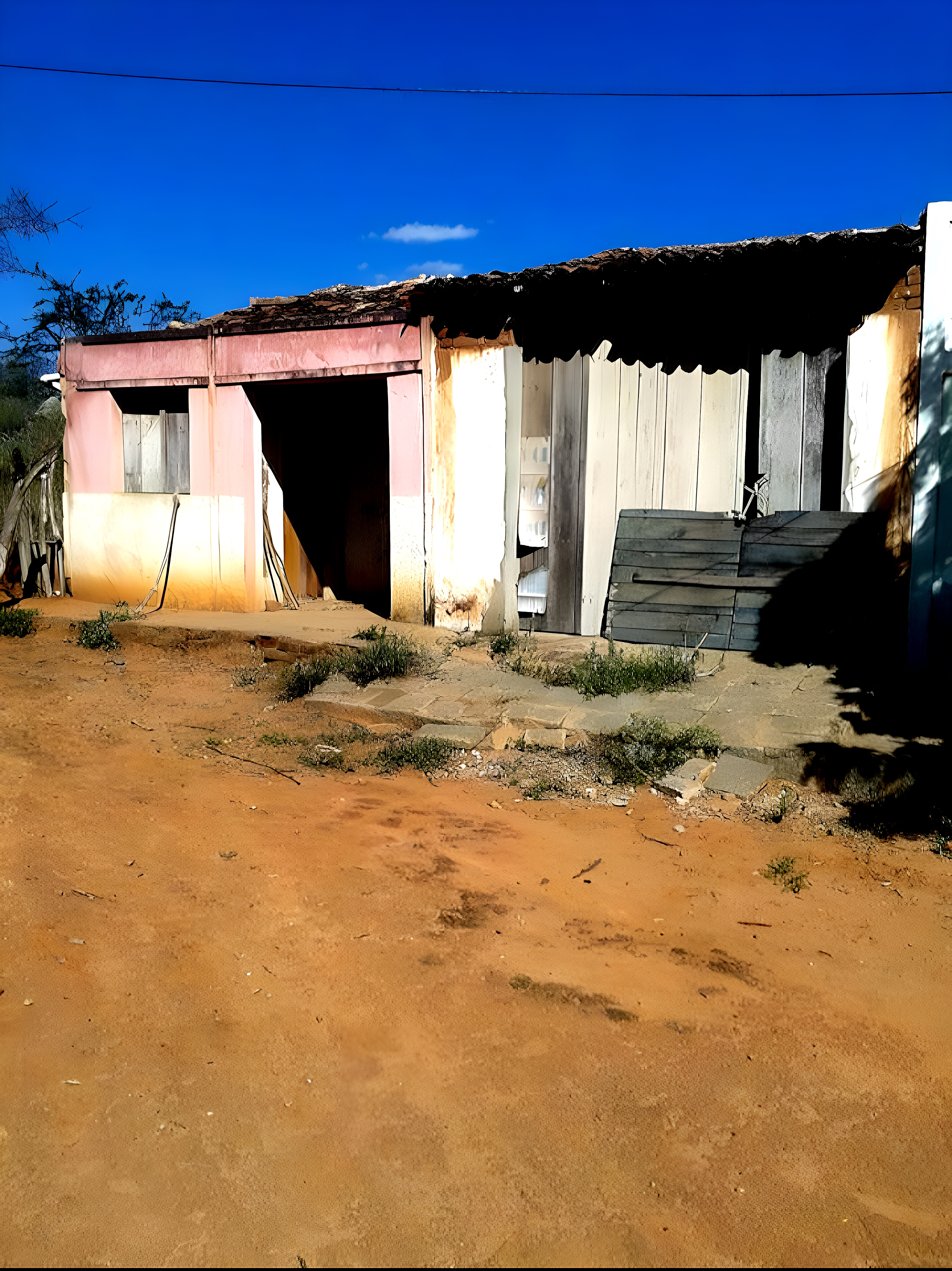
Group of abandoned houses on an old small farm in Piedade district, Itapetim municipality.

Main economic activity in Itapetim is agribusiness, especially farming of goats, cattle, sheep, pigs, chickens; and plantations of corn, and beans.

=== Economic Indicators ===
Population	GDP x(1000 R$).	GDP pc (R$)	PE
14.063	40.092	2.953	0.07%

Economy by Sector 2006

Primary sector	Secondary sector	Service sector
15.47%	9.03%	75.50%

=== Health Indicators ===
HDI (2000)	Hospitals (2007)	Hospitals beds (2007)	Children's Mortality every 1000 (2005)
0.620	1	25	31.1

== See also ==
- List of municipalities in Pernambuco
