= Tuparetama =

Municipality in Pernambuco, Brazil

- Municipality of Pernambuco, Brazil
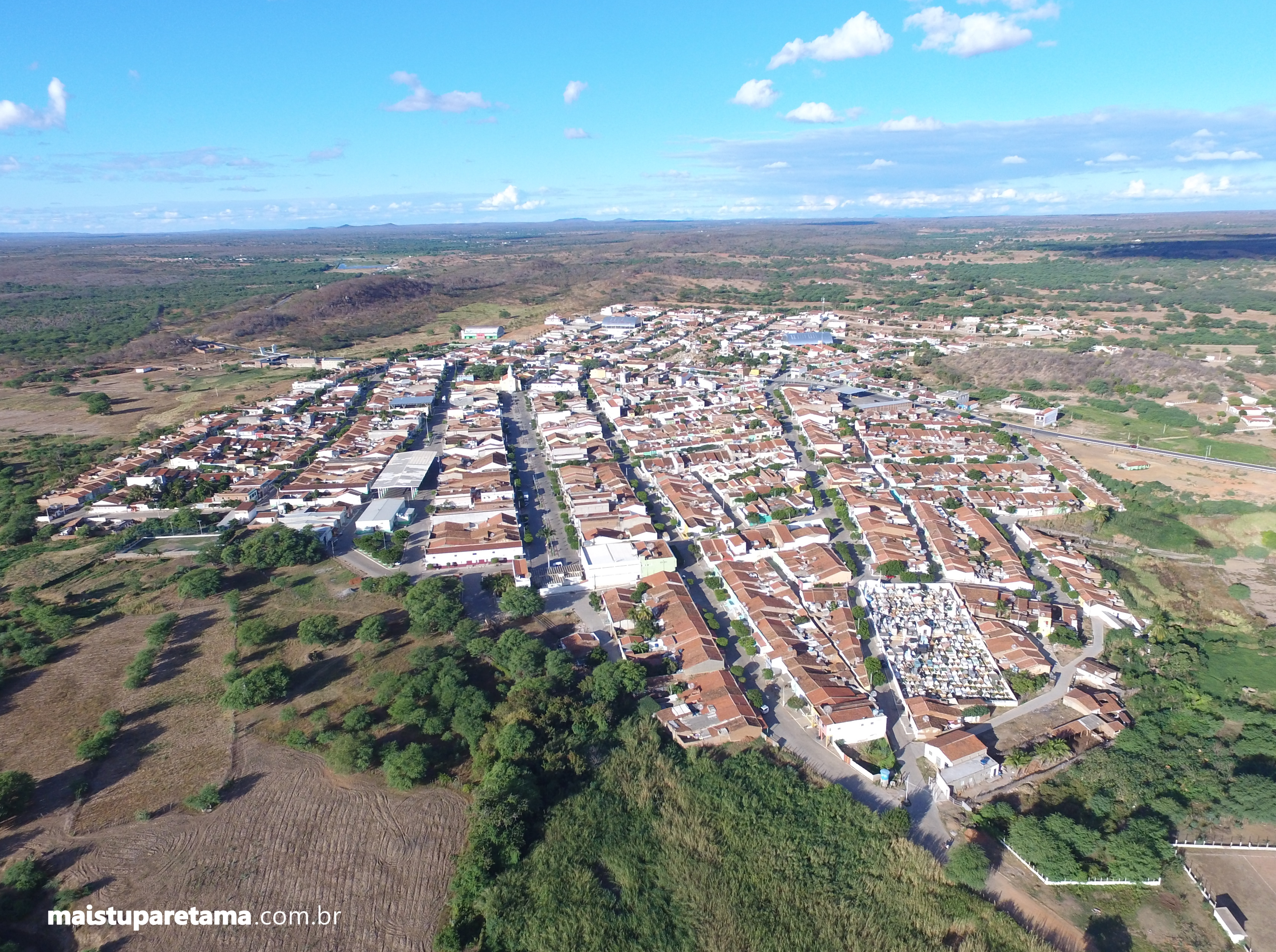
- Aerial view of Tuparetama

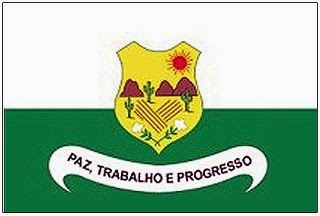
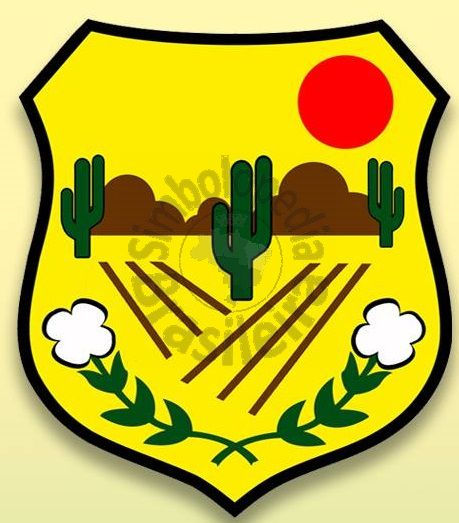
- Flag Coat of arms
- Etymology: Derived from the Tupi–Guarani language, Tupã meaning "God" and retama meaning "region", "country", "place", or "house"
- Motto: Brazilian Portuguese: Paz, trabalho e progresso English: Peace, work, and progress
- Location of Tuparetama in Pernambuco

- Location within Brazil Location within South America
- Coordinates: 7°36′7″S 37°18′39″W
- Country: Brazil
- Region: Northeast
- State: Pernambuco
- Founded: 11 April 1962

Government
  - Mayor: Diógenes Torres da Costa Patriota (PSDB) (2025-2028)
  - Vice Mayor: Maria Luciana Lima Pessôa (PODE) (2025-2028)

Area
  - Total: 188.428 km^{2} (72.752 sq mi)
- Elevation: 560 m (1,840 ft)

Population (2022 Census)
  - Total: 8,005
  - Estimate (2025): 8,261
  - Density: 42.24/km^{2} (109.4/sq mi)
- Demonym: Tuparetamense (Brazilian Portuguese)
- Time zone: UTC-03:00 (Brasília Time)
- Postal code: 56760-000, 56770-000
- HDI (2010): 0.634 – medium
- Website: tuparetama.pe.gov.br

Tuparetama (Central northeastern portuguese pronunciation: [tupɐɾɛˈtɐ̃mɐ]) is a city in the state of Pernambuco, Brazil. The population in 2025, according with IBGE was 8,261 inhabitants and the total area is 188.428 km^{2}.

== Geography ==
- State - Pernambuco
- Region - Sertão Pernambucano
- Boundaries - São José do Egito (N); Iguaraci (S); Paraíba state (E); Ingazeira and Iguaraci (W).
- Area - 185.54 km^{2}
- Elevation - 560 m
- Hydrography - Pajeú River
- Vegetation - Caatinga hiperxerófila
- Climate - semi arid - (Sertão) hot
- Annual average temperature - 23.5 c
- Distance to Recife - 377.4 km

== Economy ==
The main economic activities in Tuparetama are based in commerce and agribusiness, especially creation of sheep, cattle, pigss, goats, chickens; and plantations of beans and corn.

=== Economic Indicators ===
| Population | GDP x(1000 R$). | GDP pc (R$) | PE |
|---|---|---|---|
| 8.678 | 29.862 | 3.617 | 0.048% |

Economy by Sector 2006

| Primary sector | Secondary sector | Service sector |
|---|---|---|
| 13.31% | 10.16% | 76.53% |

=== Health Indicators ===
| HDI (2000) | Hospitals (2007) | Hospitals beds (2007) | Children's Mortality every 1000 (2005) |
|---|---|---|---|
| 0.662 | 1 | 39 | 19.4 |

== Gallery ==
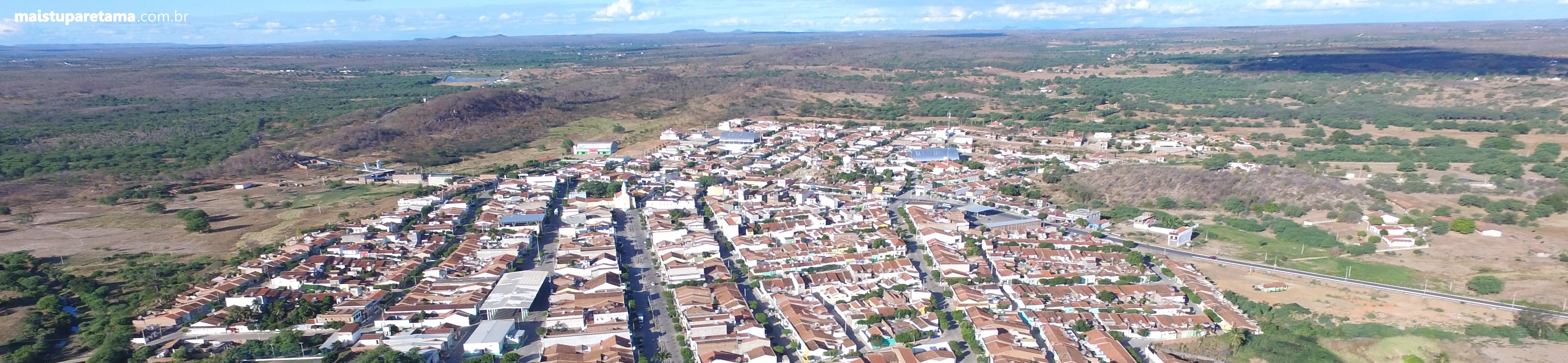
Aerial view of Tuparetama

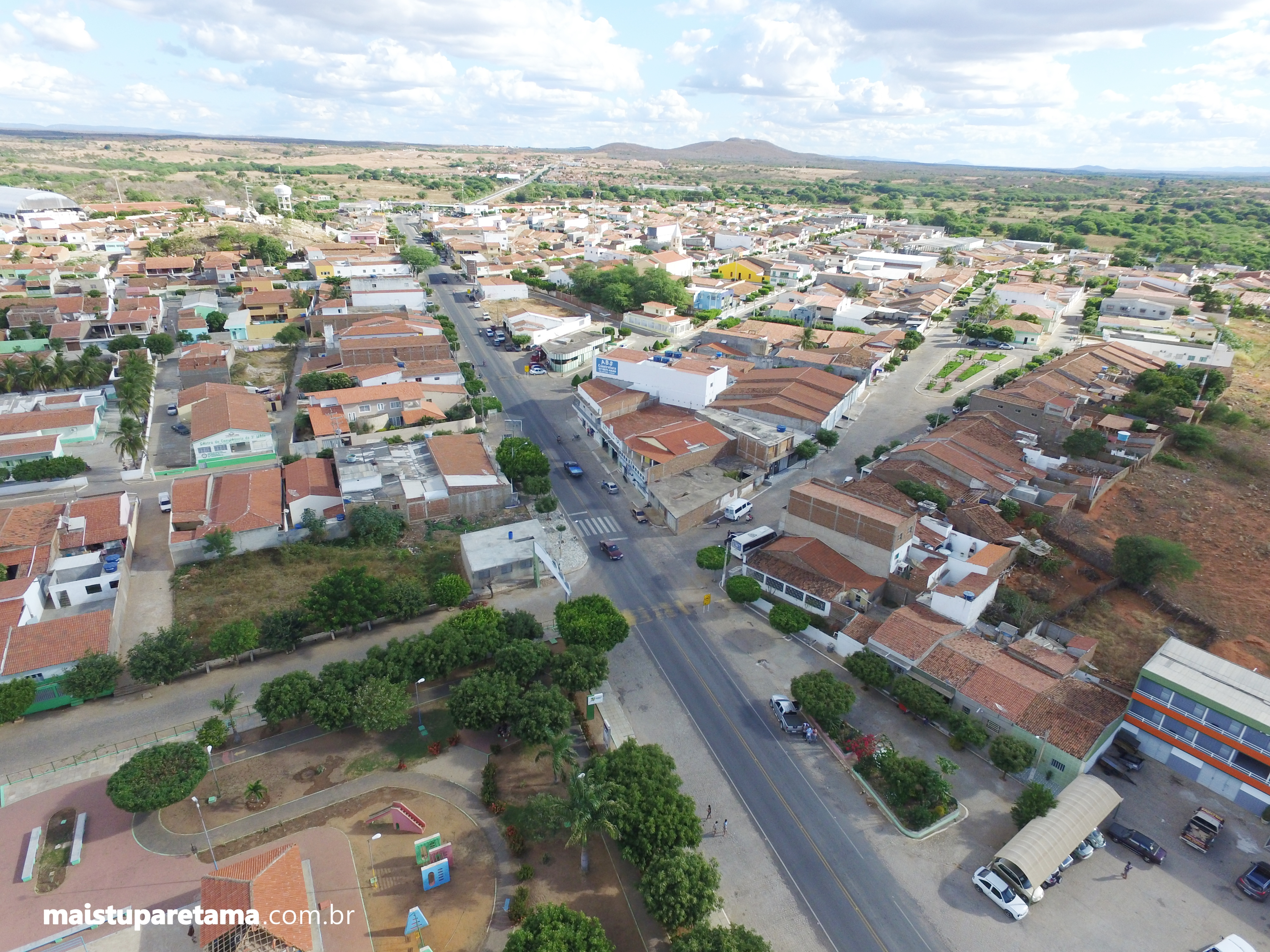
Aerial view of Tuparetama

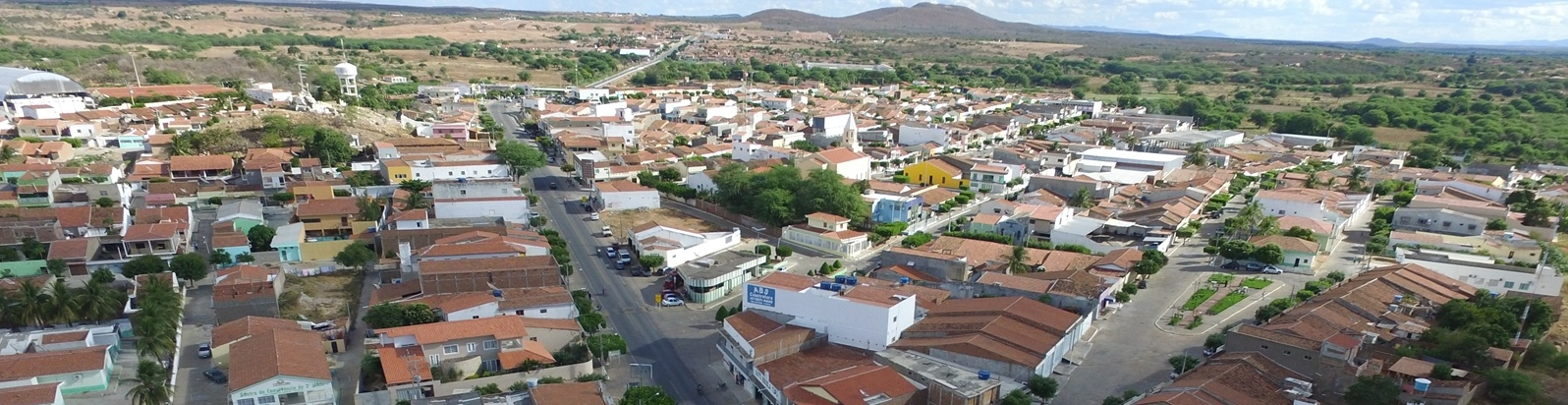
Aerial view of Tuparetama

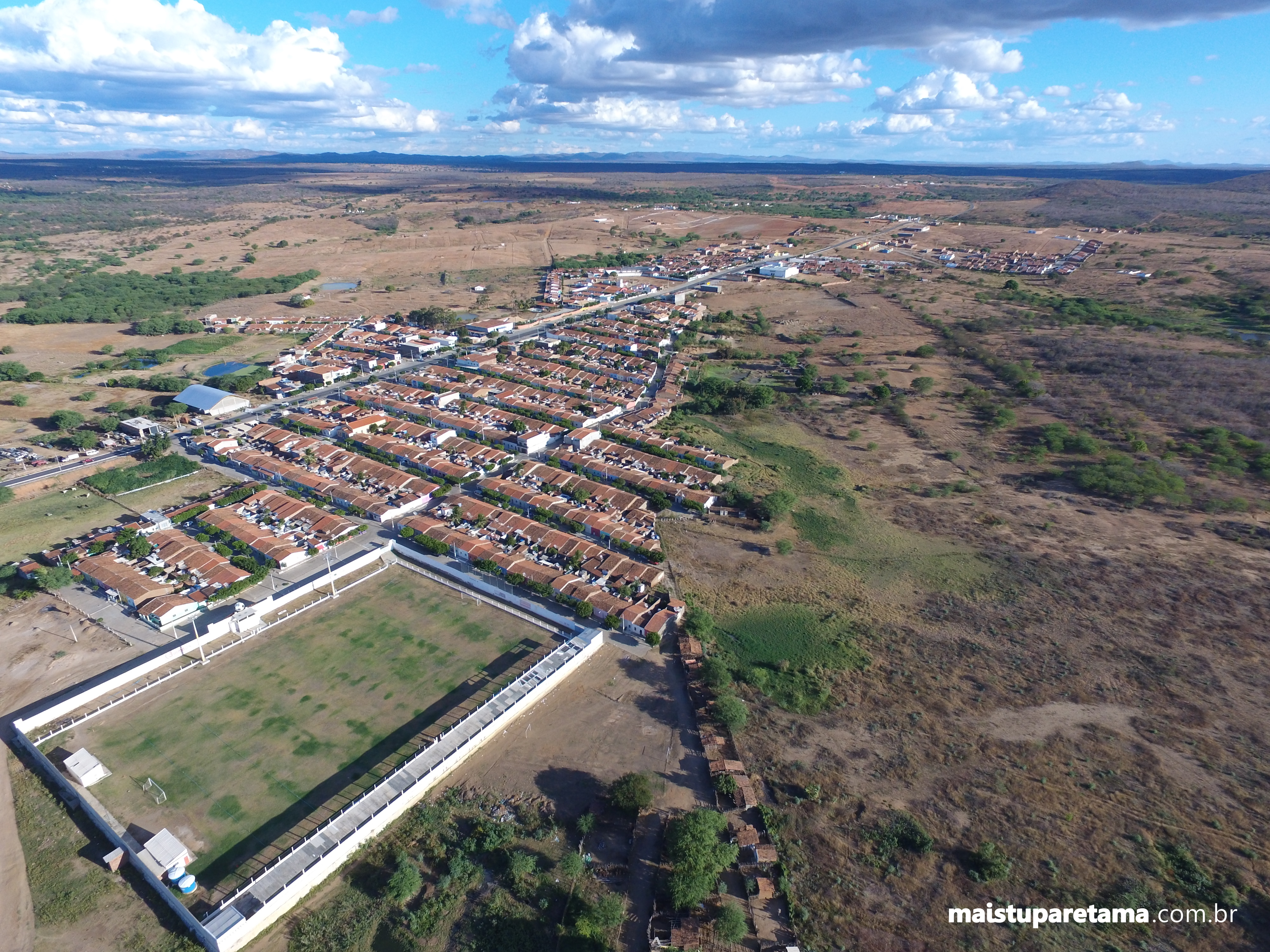
Aerial view of Tuparetama with the Lucena Chalega Stadium

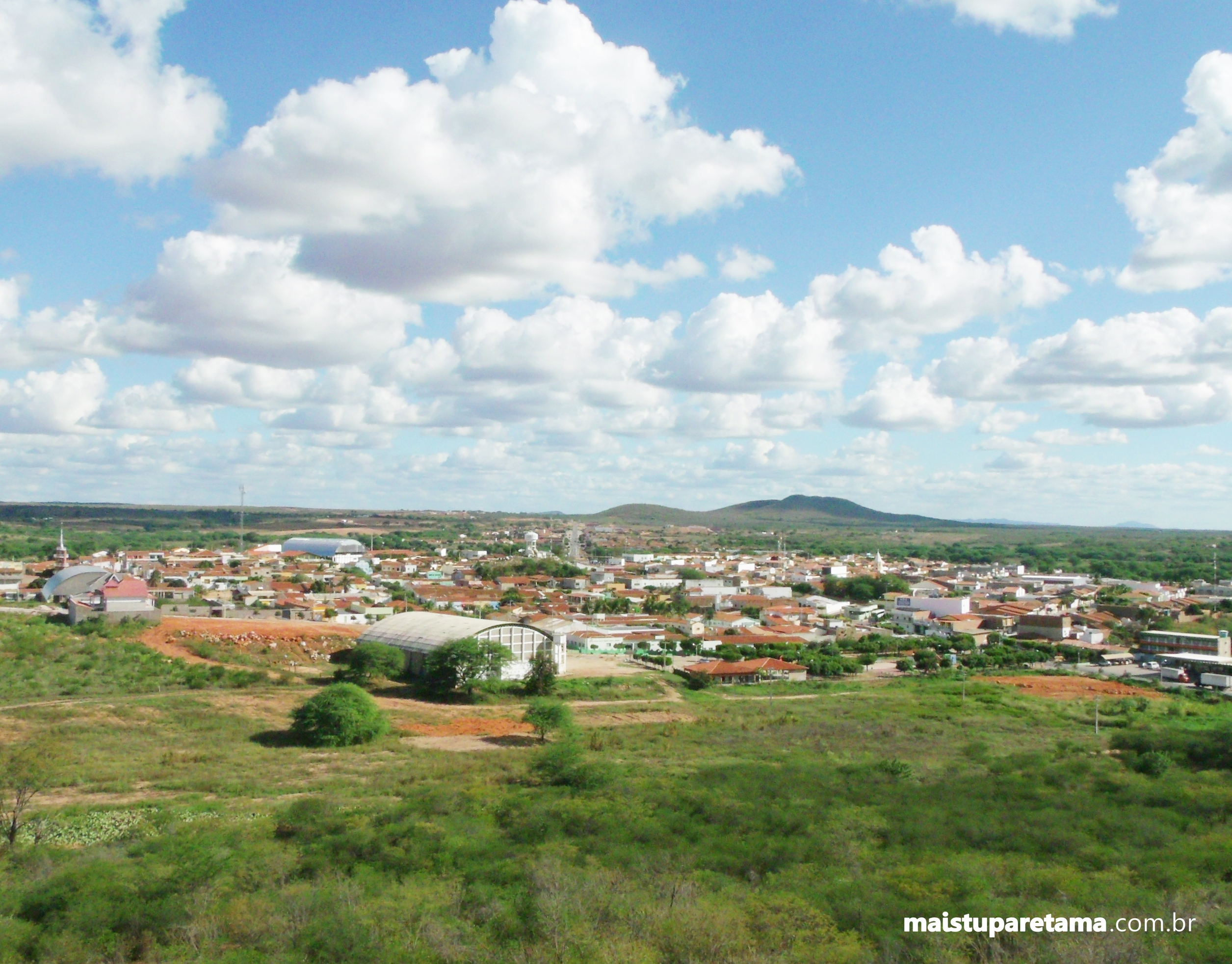
View of Tuparetama

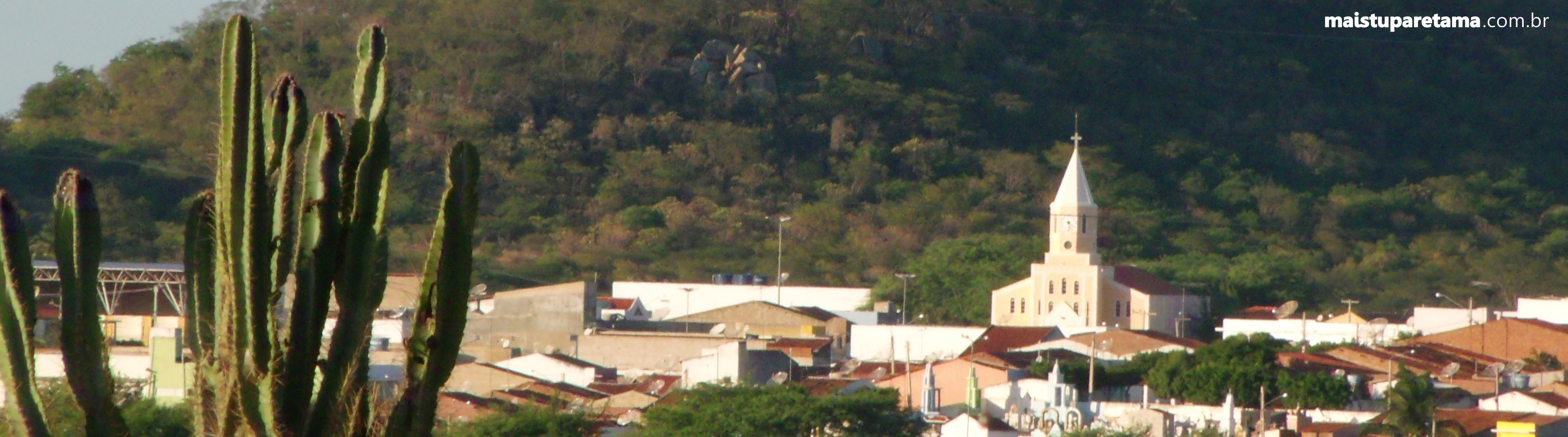
View of Tuparetama

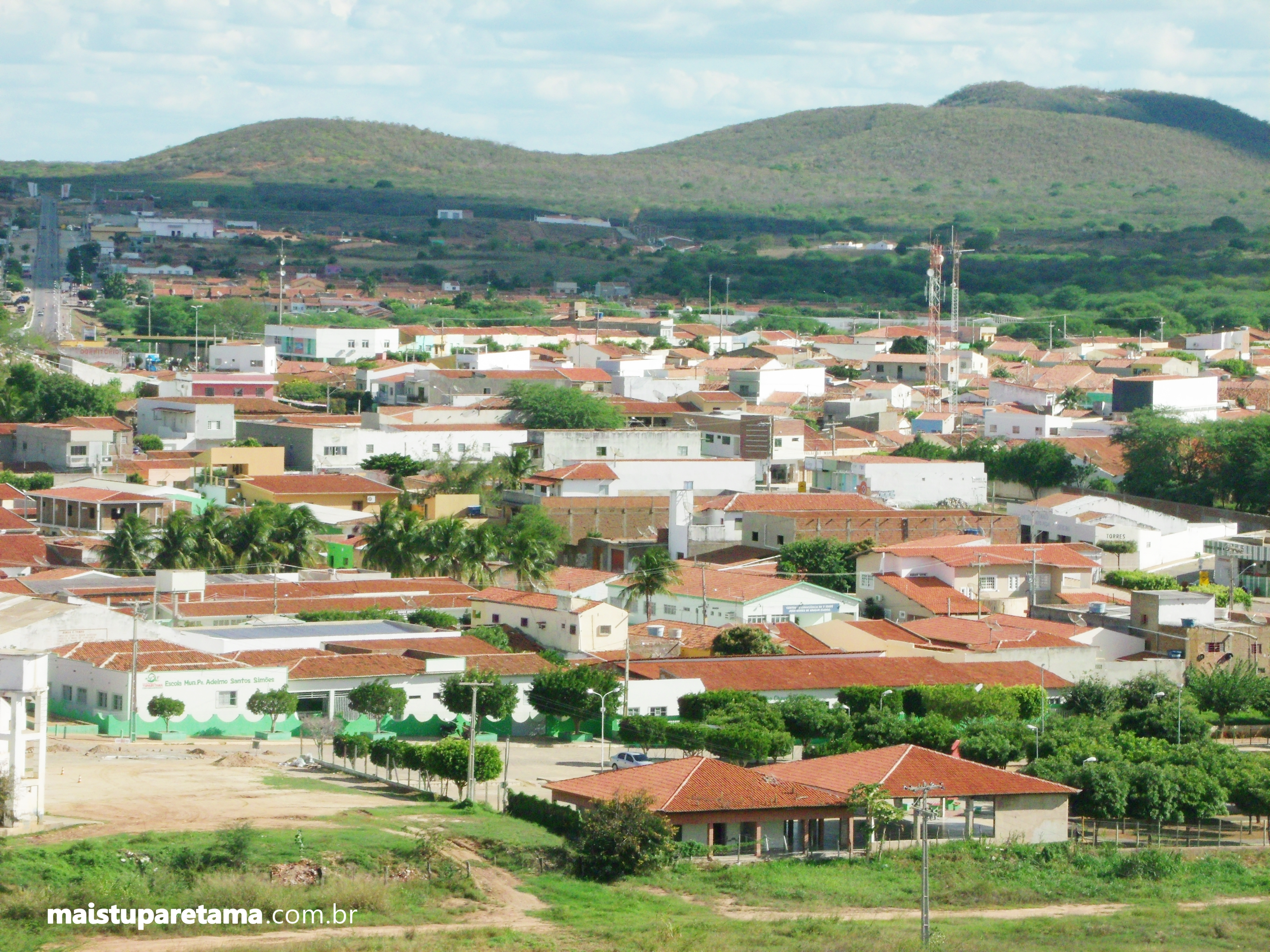
View of Tuparetama

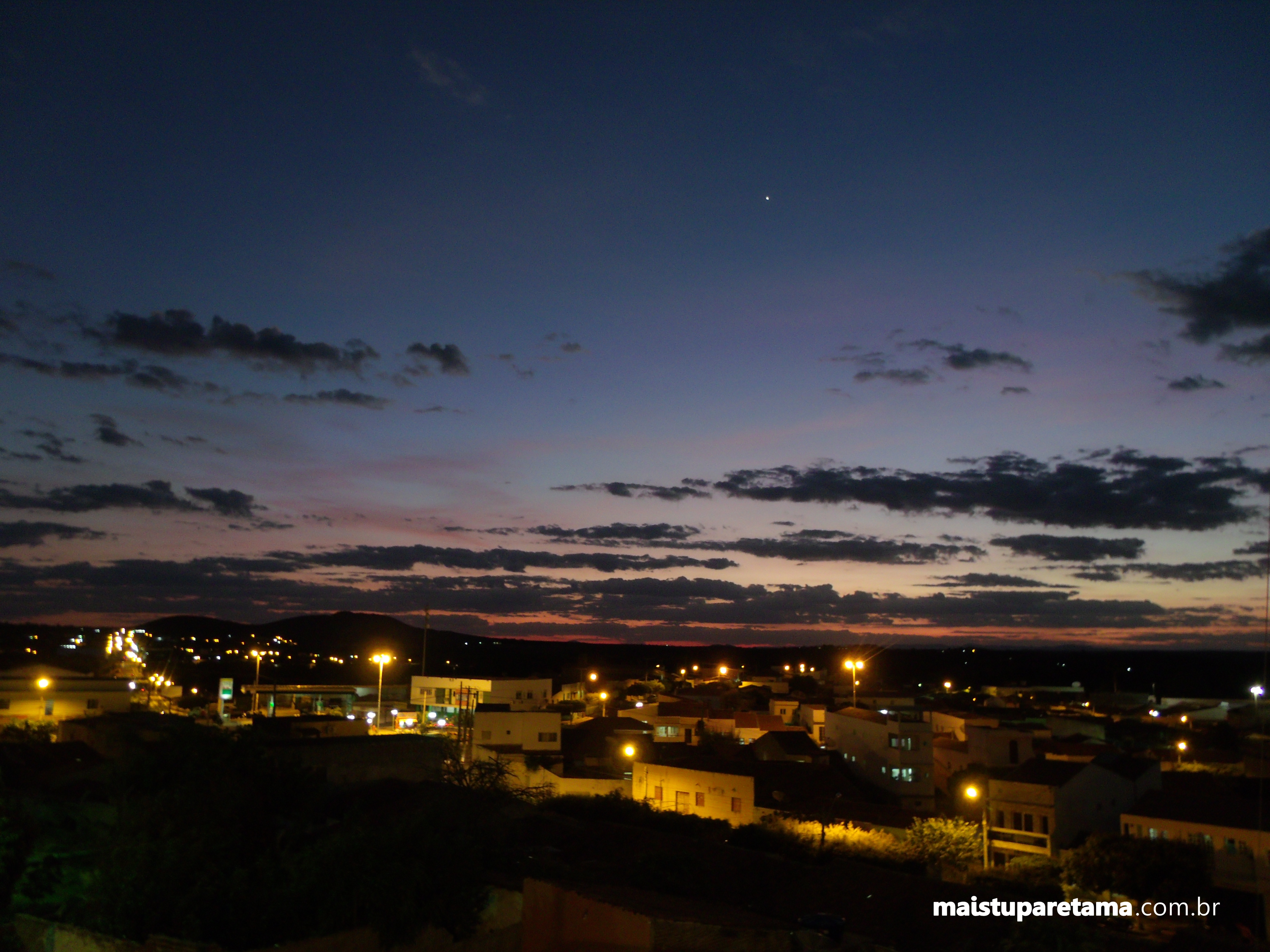
View of Tuparetama at night

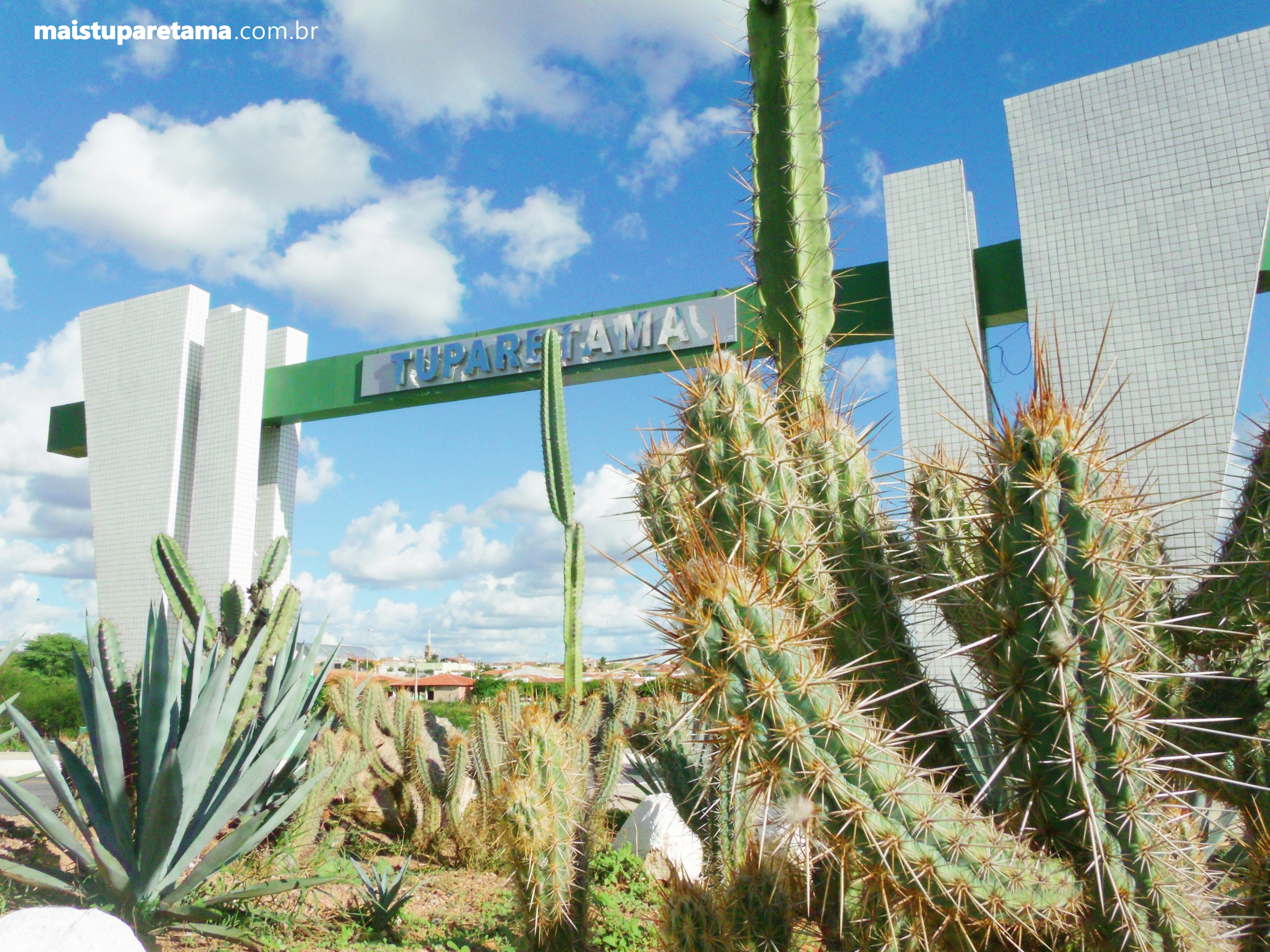
Entrance to Tuparetama

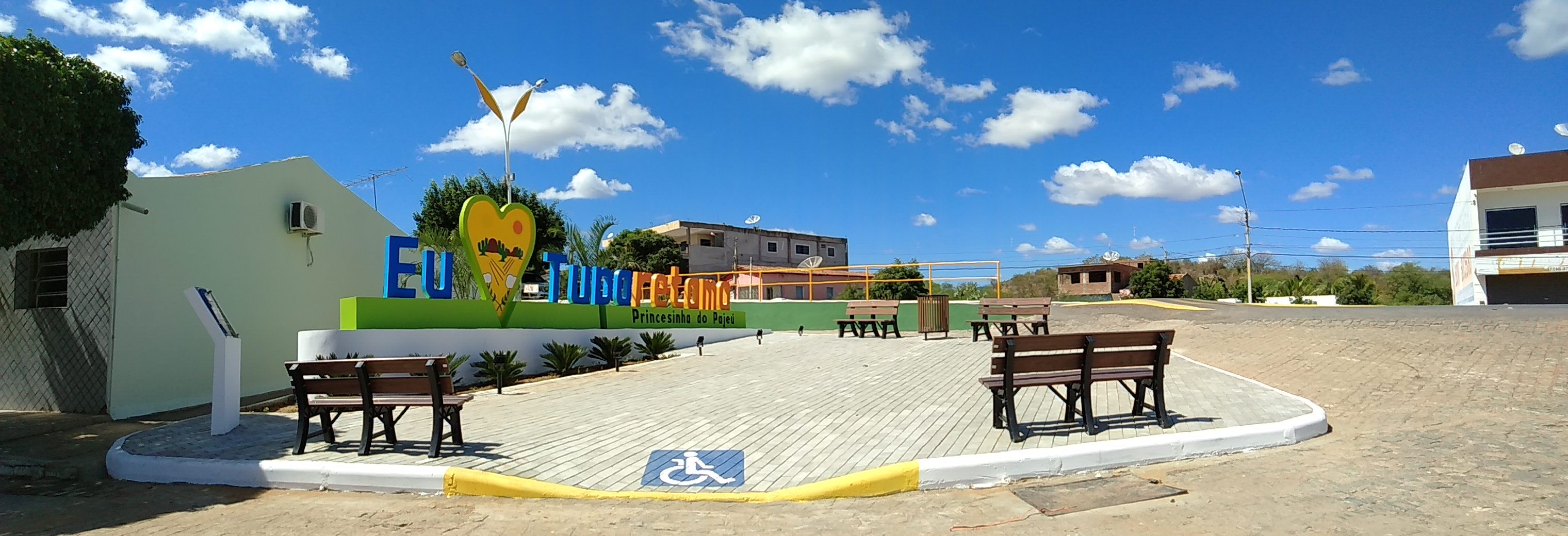
Alonso Rodrigues Plaza

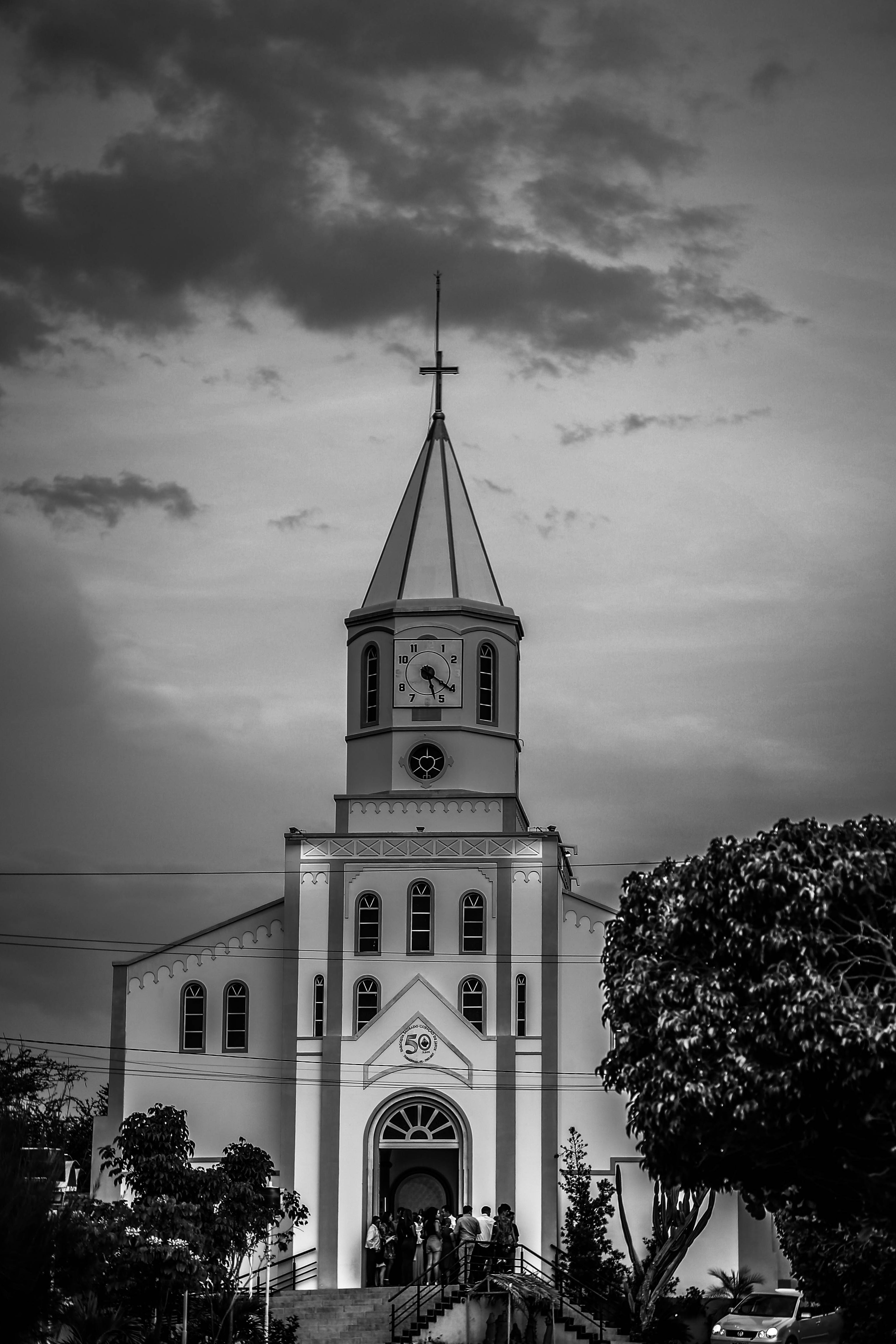
Parish of the Sacred Heart of Jesus of Tuparetama church

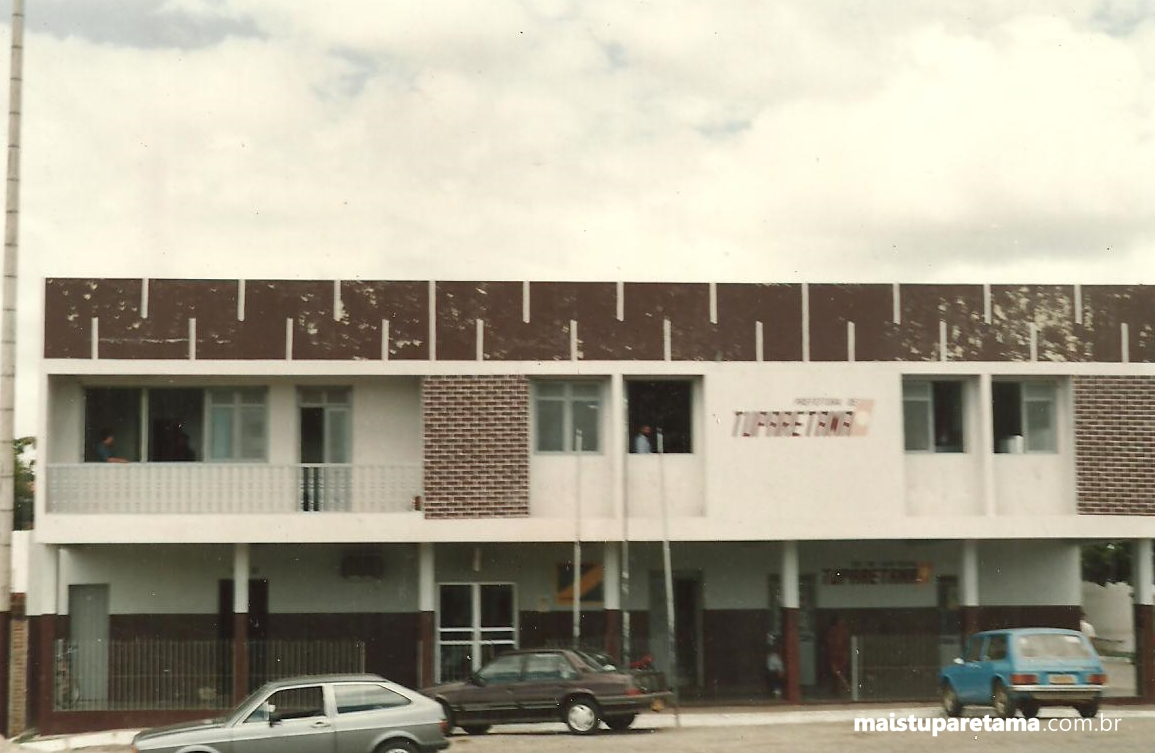
City hall of Tuparetama, photo taken between 1992 to 1996

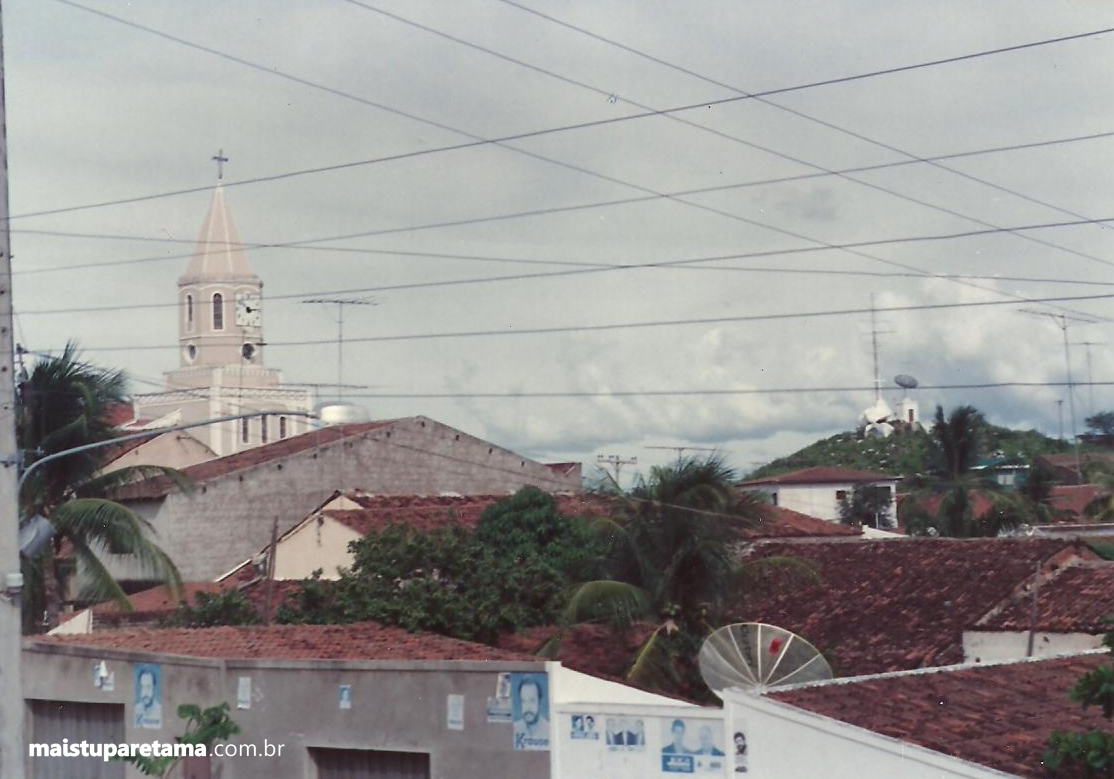
Parish of the Sacred Heart of Jesus of Tuparetama church

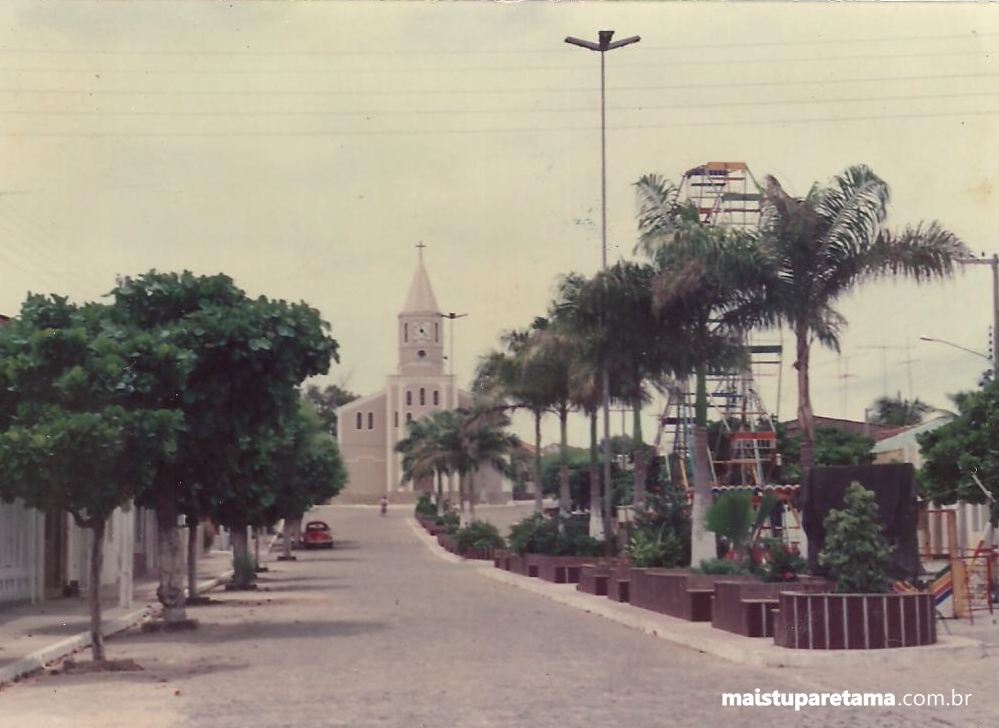
Parish of the Sacred Heart of Jesus of Tuparetama church

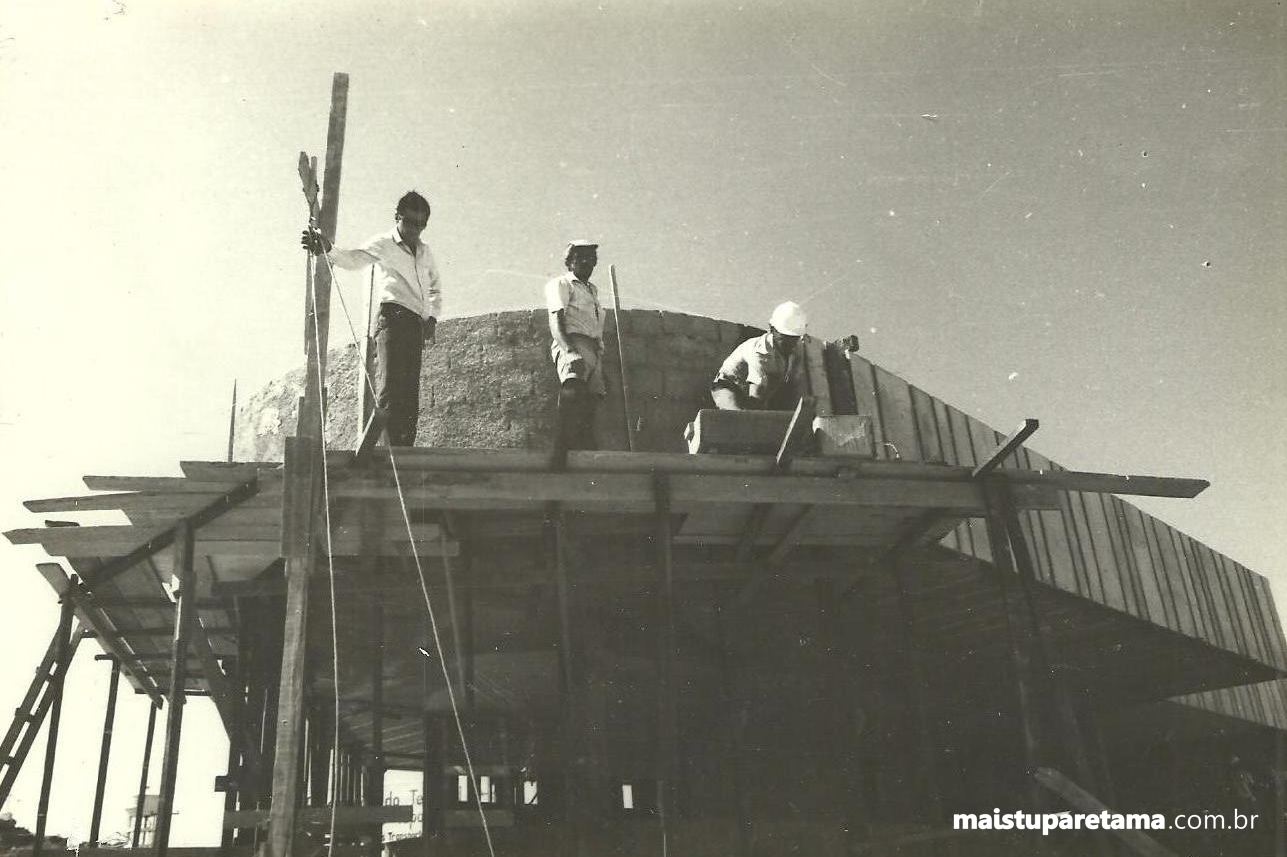
Construction of the bus station in Tuparetama

== See also ==
- List of municipalities in Pernambuco
