= Iguaraci =

City in Pernambuco, Brazil

- Municipality of Pernambuco, Brazil
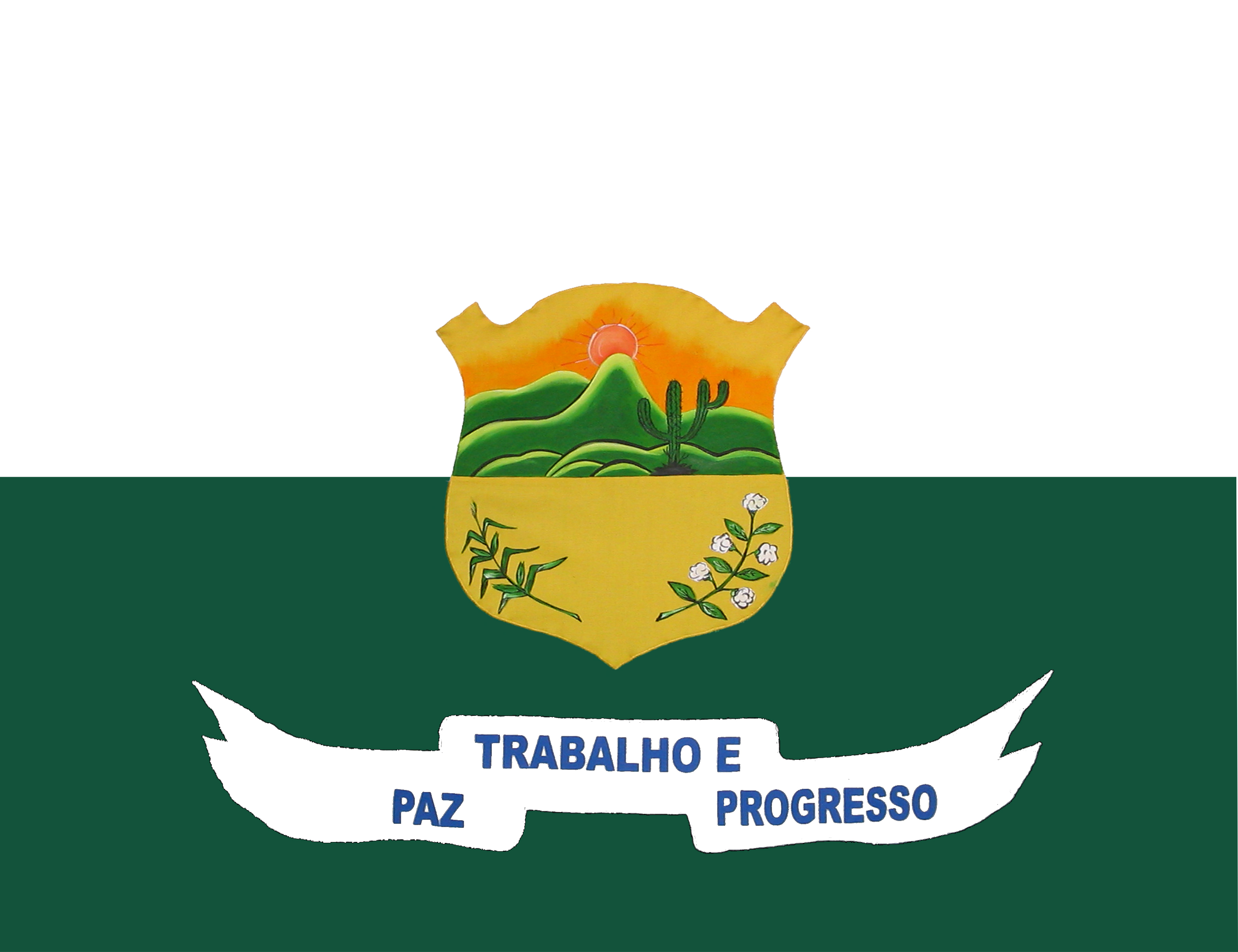
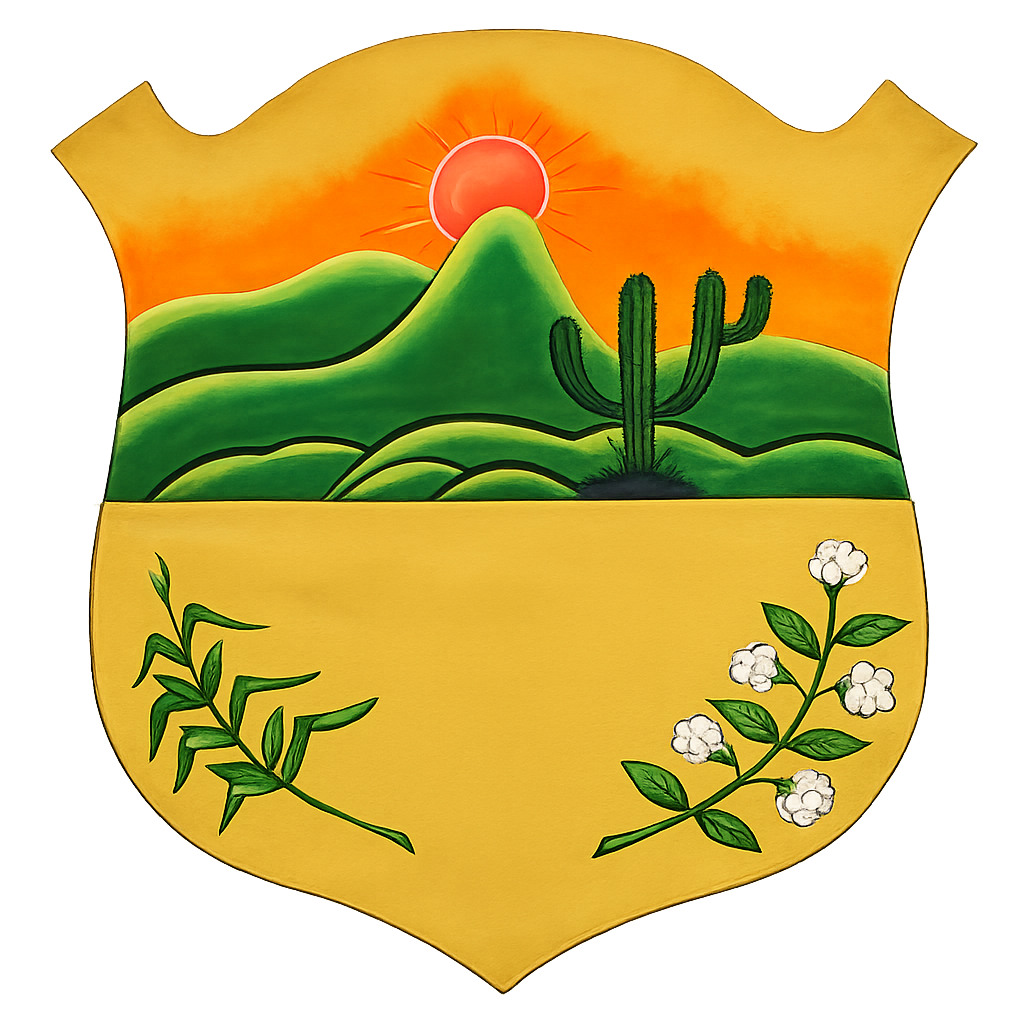
- Flag Coat of arms
- Motto(s): Brazilian Portuguese: Paz, trabalho e progresso English: Peace, work, and progress
- Location of Iguaraci in Pernambuco

- Location within Brazil Location within South America
- Coordinates: 7°50′6″S 37°30′54″W
- Country: Brazil
- Region: Northeast
- State: Pernambuco
- Founded: 20 December 1963

Government
  - Mayor: Pedro Alves de Oliveira Neto (PSDB) (2025-2028)
  - Vice Mayor: Marcos Henrique da Silva Jeronimo (PSDB) (2025-2028)

Area
  - Total: 836.046 km^{2} (322.799 sq mi)
- Elevation: 558 m (1,831 ft)

Population (2022)
  - Total: 11,081
  - Density: 13.22/km^{2} (34.2/sq mi)
- Demonym: Iguaraciense (Brazilian Portuguese)
- Time zone: UTC-03:00 (Brasília Time)
- Postal code: 56840-000, 56845-000, 56848-000
- HDI (2010): 0.598 – medium
- Website: iguaracy.pe.gov.br

Iguaraci (Central northeastern portuguese pronunciation: [iɡ͡wɐɾɐˈsi]) is a city in the state of Pernambuco, Brazil. The population in 2020, according with IBGE was 12,247 inhabitants and the total area is 838.12 km^{2}. The municipality, has one of the best children's mortality rate (5.7) of all state and, one of the best in Brazil.

== Geography ==
- State - Pernambuco
- Region - Sertão Pernambucano
- Boundaries - Ingazeira, Tuparetama and Tabira (N); Custódia and Sertânia (S); Tuparetama and Paraíba state (E); Afogados da Ingazeira (W)
- Area - 838.12 km^{2}
- Elevation - 571 m
- Hydrography - Pajeú and Moxotó Rivers
- Vegetation - Caatinga Hiperxerófila
- Climate - Hot tropical
- Annual average temperature - 23.8 c
- Distance to Recife - 356 km

== Economy ==
The main economic activities in Iguaraci are based in commerce and agribusiness, especially creation of goats, cattle, sheep, pigs, chickens; and plantations of corn and beans.

=== Economic Indicators ===
| Population | GDP x(1000 R$). | GDP pc (R$) | PE |
|---|---|---|---|
| 11.387 | 35.334 | 2.974 | 0.06% |

Economy by Sector 2006

| Primary sector | Secondary sector | Service sector |
|---|---|---|
| 19.42% | 8.43% | 72.15% |

=== Health Indicators ===
| HDI (2000) | Hospitals (2007) | Hospitals beds (2007) | Children's Mortality every 1000 (2005) |
|---|---|---|---|
| 0.604 | 1 | 16 | 5.7 |

== See also ==
- List of municipalities in Pernambuco
