= Brejinho =

Municipality in Pernambuco state, Brazil

- Municipality
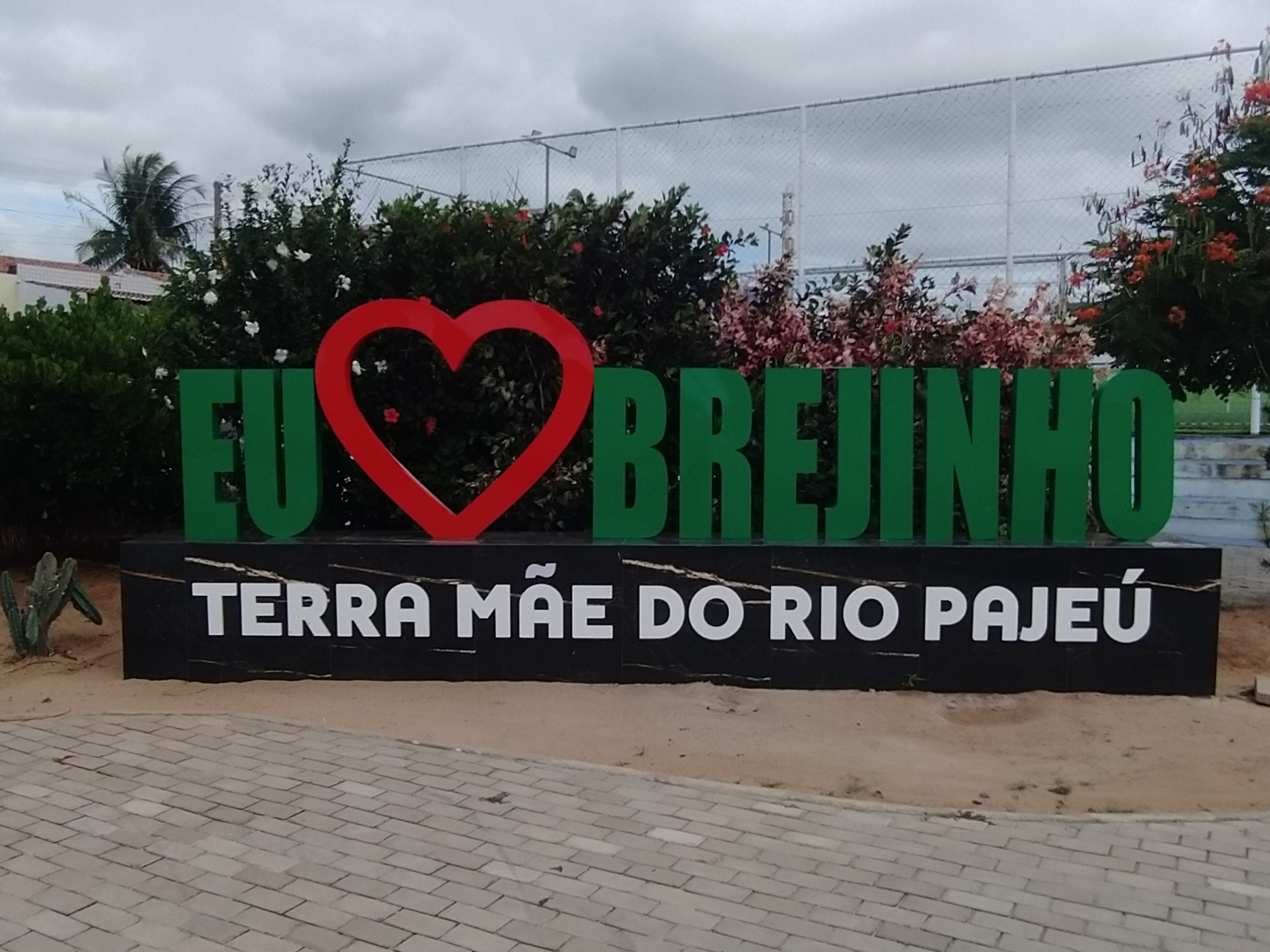

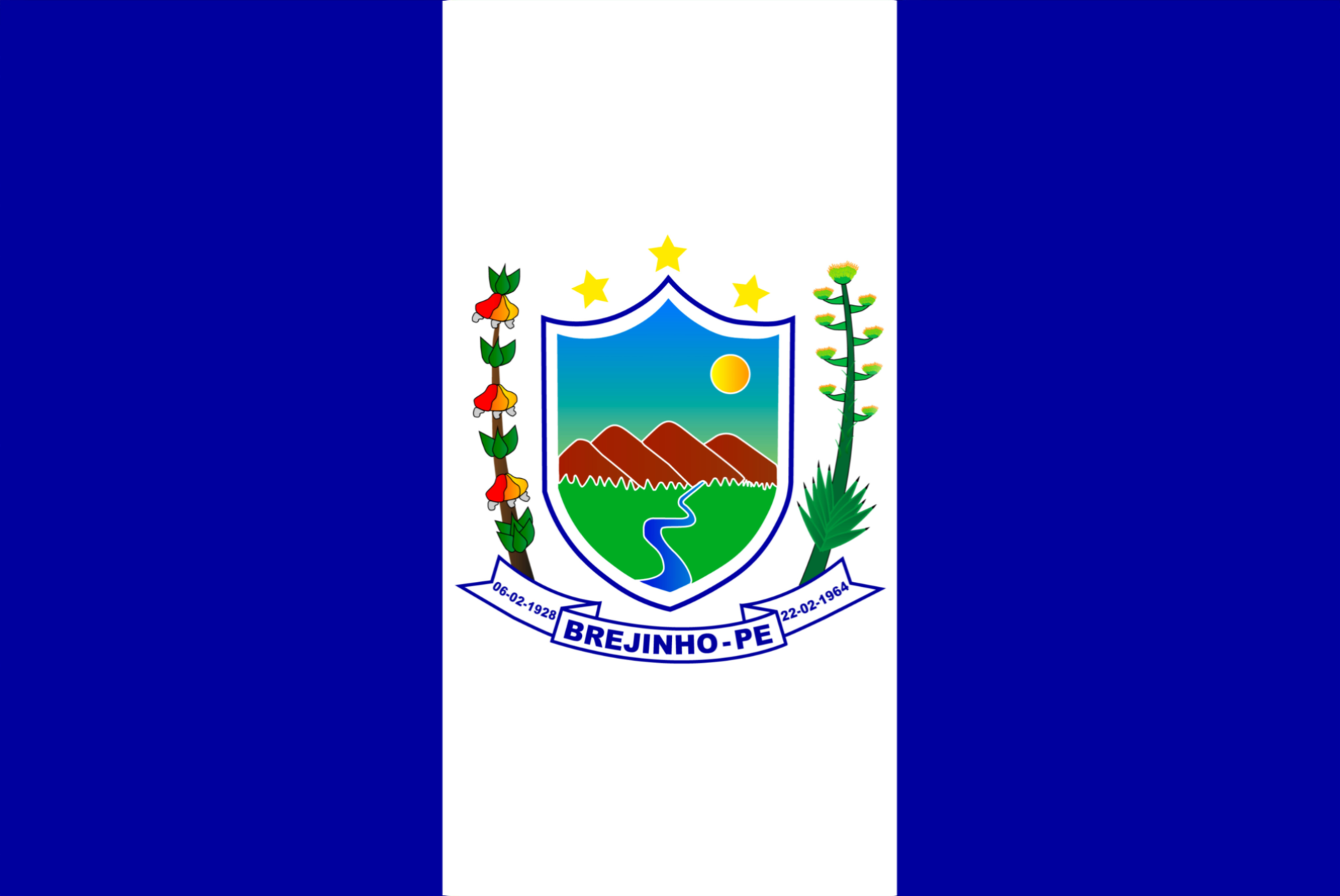
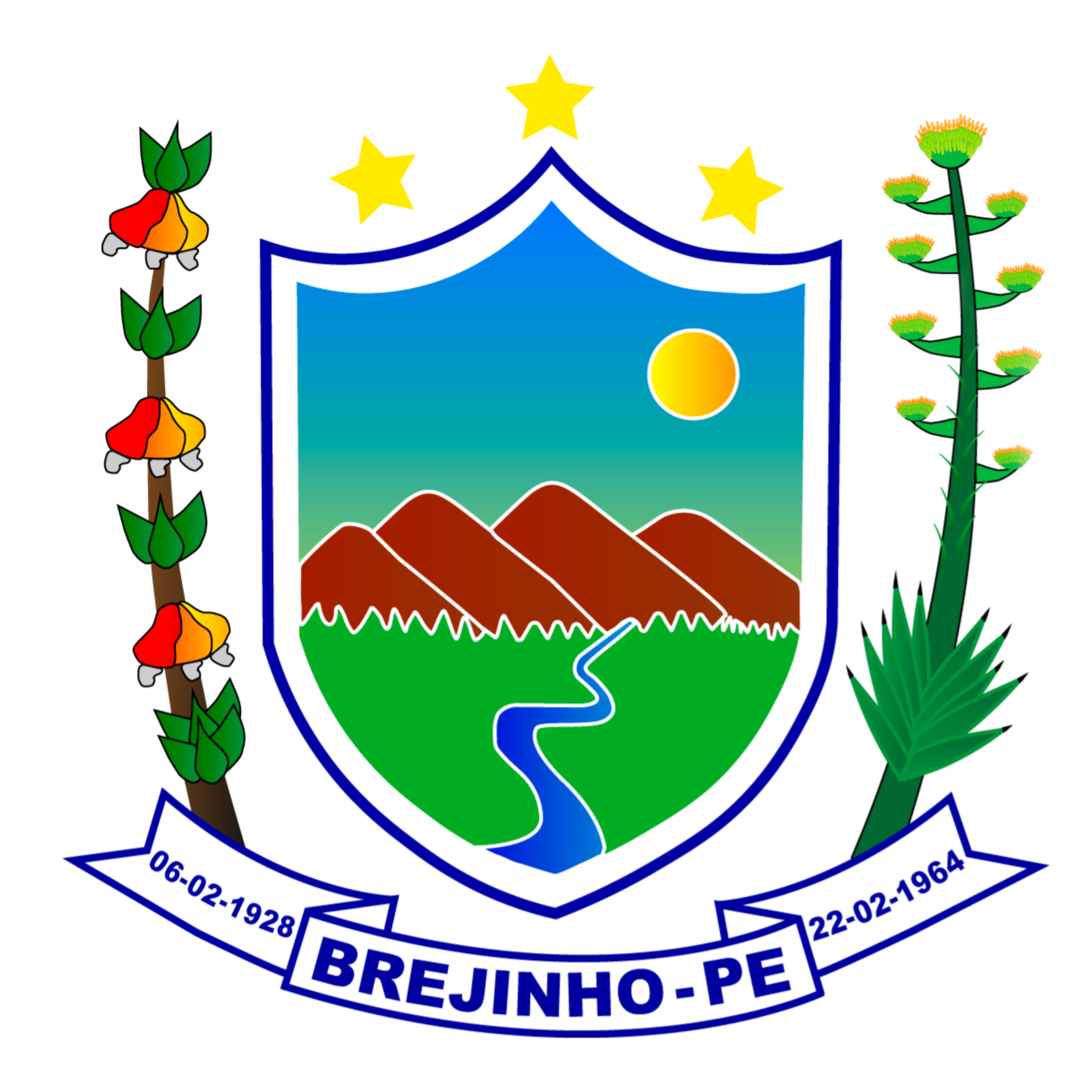
- Flag Coat of arms

- Location of Brejinho in Pernambuco

- Location within Brazil Location within South America
- Coordinates: 7°20′50″S 37°17′13″W
- Country: Brazil
- Region: Northeast
- State: Pernambuco
- Founded: 20 December 1963

Government
  - Mayor: Gilsomar Bento da Costa (Republicanos) (2025-2028)
  - Vice Mayor: Josinaldo Alves da Costa (PODE) (2025-2028)

Area
  - Total: 106.039 km^{2} (40.942 sq mi)
- Elevation: 737 m (2,418 ft)

Population (2022 Census)
  - Total: 7,720
  - Estimate (2025): 8,033
  - Density: 72.8/km^{2} (189/sq mi)
- Demonym: Breijinhense (Brazilian Portuguese)
- Time zone: UTC-03:00 (Brasília Time)
- Postal code: 56740-000
- HDI (2010): 0.574 – medium
- Website: brejinho.pe.gov.br

Brejinho (Central northeastern portuguese pronunciation: [bɾɛˈʒĩj̃u]) (Little Swamp) is a city in the state of Pernambuco, Brazil. The population in 2025, according to IBGE was 8,033 and the area is 106.066 km^{2}.

== Geography ==
- State - Pernambuco
- Region - Sertão Pernambucano
- Boundaries - Paraíba state (N and W); São José do Egito and Terezinha (S); Itapetim (E).
- Area - 106.3 km²
- Elevation - 737 m
- Hydrography - Pajeú River
- Vegetation - Caatinga hiperxerófila
- Climate - semi arid - hot and dry
- Annual average temperature - 22.5 c
- Distance to Recife - 410 km

== Economy ==
The main economic activity in Brejinho is agribusiness, especially the breeding of cattle, goats, sheep, pigs, chickens; and planting of corn and beans.

=== Economic Indicators ===
Population	GDP x(1000 R$).	GDP pc (R$)	PE
7.369	21.814	3.047	0.035%

Economy by Sector 2006

Primary sector	Secondary sector	Service sector
14.01%	9.13%	76.86%

=== Health Indicators ===
HDI (2000)	Hospitals (2007)	Hospitals beds (2007)	Children's Mortality every 1000 (2005)
0.586	1	7	--

== See also ==
- List of municipalities in Pernambuco
