= Tabira, Pernambuco =

Municipality of Pernambuco, Brazil

Tabira
- Municipality of Pernambuco, Brazil
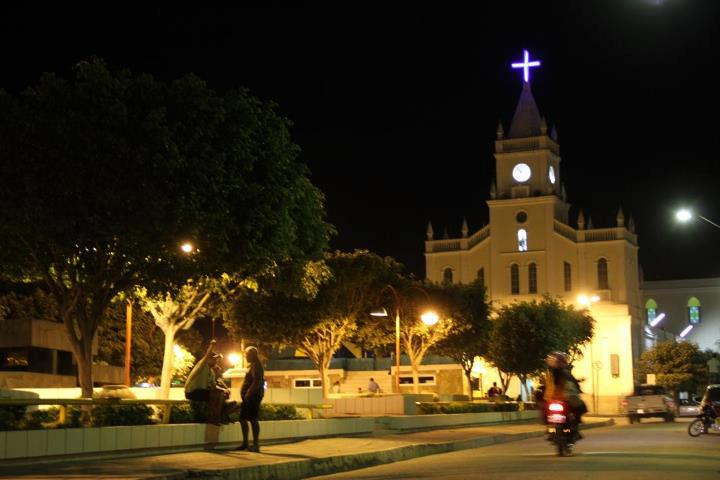
- Gonçalo Gomes Plaza and Tabira Parish Church in Tabira

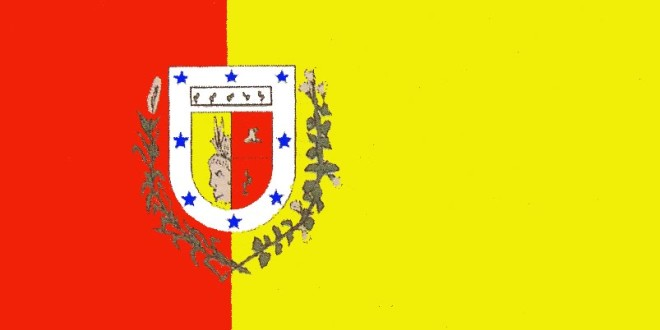
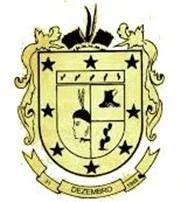
- Flag Coat of arms
- Etymology: Named after an indigenous warrior
- Location of Tabira in Pernambuco

- Location within Brazil Location within South America
- Coordinates: 7°35′27″S 37°32′22″W
- Country: Brazil
- Region: Northeast
- State: Pernambuco
- Founded: 31 December 1948

Government
  - Mayor: Flávio Ferreira Marques (PT) (2025-2028)
  - Vice Mayor: Marcos Antônio da Silva (PSB) (2025-2028)

Area
  - Total: 388.459 km^{2} (149.985 sq mi)
- Elevation: 588 m (1,929 ft)

Population (2022 Census)
  - Total: 27,681
  - Estimate (2025): 29,180
  - Density: 70.9/km^{2} (184/sq mi)
- Demonym: Tabirense (Brazilian Portuguese)
- Time zone: UTC-03:00 (Brasília Time)
- Postal code: 56780-000
- HDI (2010): 0.605 – medium
- Website: tabira.pe.gov.br

Tabira (Central northeastern portuguese pronunciation: [tɐˈbiɾɐ]) is a city in the state of Pernambuco, Brazil. The population in 2025, according to the Brazilian Institute of Geography and Statistics, was 29,180 inhabitants and its land area was 388 km^{2}.

== Geography ==
- State - Pernambuco
- Region - Sertão Pernambucano
- Boundaries - Santa Terezinha and Paraíba state (N); Ingazeira and Iguaraci (S); Santa Terezinha and São José do Egito (E); Afogados da Ingazeira and Solidão (W).
- Area - 388 km^{2}
- Elevation - 558 m
- Hydrography - Pajeú River
- Vegetation - Caatinga hiperxerófila
- Climate - semi-arid hot and tropical hot
- Annual average temperature - 27.0 c
- Distance to Recife - 398 km

== Economy ==
The main economic activities in Tabira are based in the food and beverage industry, commerce and agribusiness, especially the raising of cattle, sheep, pigs, goats; and plantations of corn and beans.

=== Economic indicators ===
| Population | GDP x(1000 R$). | GDP pc (R$) | PE |
|---|---|---|---|
| 27.219 | 79.835 | 3.090 | 0.132% |

Economy by sector 2006

| Primary sector | Secondary sector | Service sector |
|---|---|---|
| 11.45% | 10.54% | 78.01% |

=== Health indicators ===
| HDI (2000) | Hospitals (2007) | Hospitals beds (2007) | Children's mortality every 1000 (2005) |
|---|---|---|---|
| 0.630 | 1 | 66 | na |

== See also ==
- List of municipalities in Pernambuco
