= Solidão =

Municipality of Pernambuco, Brazil

- Municipality of Pernambuco, Brazil
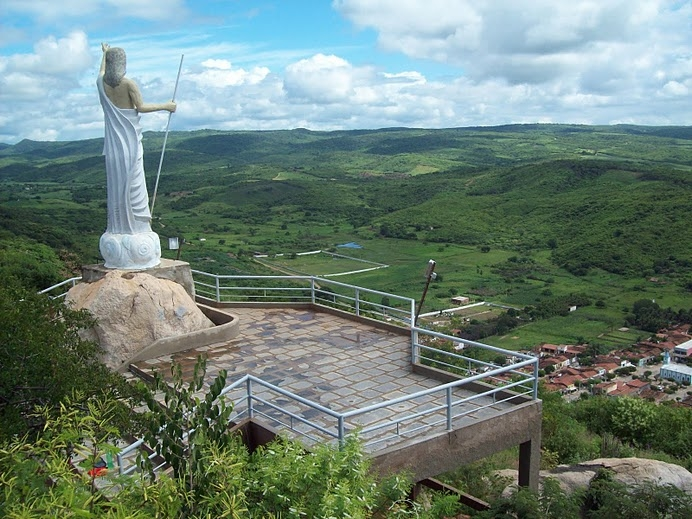
- Statue of the Resurrected Christ in Solidão

- Flag Coat of arms

- Location of Solidão in Pernambuco

- Location within Brazil Location within South America
- Coordinates: 7°36′0″S 37°39′7″W
- Country: Brazil
- Region: Northeast
- State: Pernambuco
- Founded: 20 December 1963

Government
  - Mayor: Mayco Pablo Santos Araujo (PSB) (2025-2028)
  - Vice Mayor: Antonio Marinheiro de Lima (PSB) (2025-2028)

Area
  - Total: 138.599 km^{2} (53.513 sq mi)
- Elevation: 586 m (1,923 ft)

Population (2022 Census)
  - Total: 5,210
  - Estimate (2025): 5,386
  - Density: 37.65/km^{2} (97.5/sq mi)
- Demonym: Solidanense (Brazilian Portuguese)
- Time zone: UTC-03:00 (Brasília Time)
- Postal code: 56795-000
- HDI (2010): 0.585 – medium
- Website: solidao.pe.gov.br

Solidão (Central northeastern portuguese pronunciation: [sɔliˈdɐ̃w]) is a city in the state of Pernambuco, Brazil. The population in 2025 was 5,306 inhabitants according to the IBGE, and the total area is 138.6 km^{2} (53.5 sq mi).

== Geography ==
- State - Pernambuco
- Region - Sertão Pernambucano
- Boundaries - Paraíba state (North and West); Afogados da Ingazeira and Carnaíba (South); Tabira (East).
- Area - 138.4 km^{2} (53.4 sq mi)
- Elevation - 586 m (1,923 ft)
- Hydrography - Pajeú River
- Vegetation - Caatinga hiperxerófila
- Climate - semi arid - (Sertão) hot
- Annual average temperature - 27.0 °C (80.6 °F)
- Distance to Recife - 403.6 km (250.8 mi)

== Economy ==
The main economic activities in Solidão are based in agribusiness, especially creation of goats, cattle, chickens; and plantations of corn and beans.

=== Economic Indicators ===
Population	GDP x(1000 R$).	GDP pc (R$)	PE
6.123	17.139	2.936	0.03%

Economy by Sector 2006

Primary sector	Secondary sector	Service sector
11.76%	7.26%	80.98%

=== Health Indicators ===
HDI (2000)	Hospitals (2007)	Hospital beds (2007)	Children's Mortality every 1000 (2005)
0.581	1	5	35.4

== See also ==
- List of municipalities in Pernambuco
