= Peddie =

Peddie may refer to:

Surname:

- Dr Alexander Peddie, Scottish physician
- Bruce Peddie, American college baseball coach
- Jack Peddie (1876–1928), Scottish football player who played for various clubs in both England and Scotland
- James Peddie, Baron Peddie, MBE (1905–1978), British businessman and politician
- John Dick Peddie (1824–1891), Scottish architect and Liberal MP for Kilmarnock Burghs
- John More Dick Peddie (1853–1921), Scottish architect
- John Ronald Peddie (1887–1979) Scottish administrator
- Richard Peddie, President and CEO of Maple Leafs Sports and Entertainment
- Thomas Baldwin Peddie (1808–1889), American Republican politician
- Timm Peddie, retired professional track and road bicycle racer from the United States
- William Peddie (1861–1946), Scottish physicist

Geography:

- Peddie, Eastern Cape, town in South Africa
- Mount Peddie, isolated mountain north of Webster Bluff at the north end of the Ford Ranges in Marie Byrd Land

Other:

- First Baptist Peddie Memorial Church, historic church at Broad and Fulton Streets in Newark, New Jersey
- Peddie School, college preparatory school in Hightstown, New Jersey, United States

== See also ==
- Peddiea
- Pedetidae
- Piedade (disambiguation)

Media related to Peddie at Wikimedia Commons
