= Folha Egipciense =

Brazilian newspaper

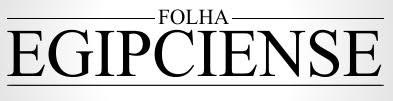
- Folha Egipciense logo

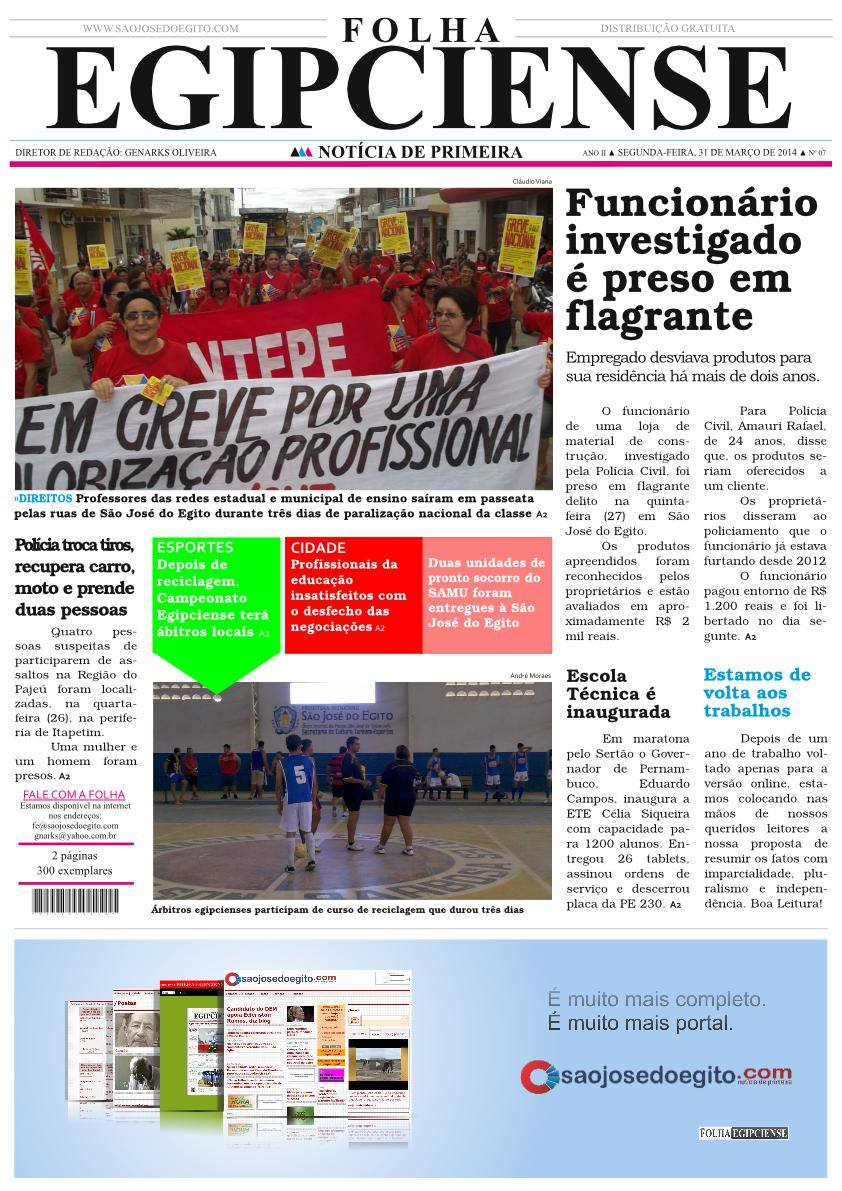
- Folha Egipciense publicada em 31 de Março de 2014
- Type: weekly newspaper
- Format: A3
- Owner: Grupo Egipciense de Comunicacao
- Founder: Genarks Oliveira
- Editor: Genarks Oliveira
- Founded: 20 February 2001; 24 years ago
- Political alignment: Pluralism; Nonpartisanism
- Language: Portuguese
- Headquarters: São José do Egito, PE 56.700-000
- Country: Brasil
- Circulation: 1.200
- Website: geacomunicacao.com.br

Folha Egipciense is a Brazilian newspaper published in the city of São José do Egito, Pernambuco. The average weekly circulation in 2012 was 1,200 copies.

Founded and led by journalist Genarks Oliveira on February 20, 2001, Folha Egipciense was created with the aim of recording historical moments related to the municipality and the Alto Pajeú Region, Sertão of the State of Pernambuco.
