= Cathedral of the Lord Good Jesus of the Remedies =

- Catedral do Senhor Bom Jesus dos Remédios
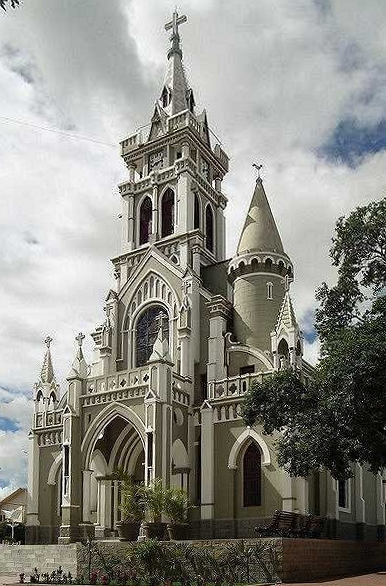
- Cathedral of the Lord Good Jesus of the Remedies
- Location: Afogados da Ingazeira
- Country: Brazil
- Denomination: Roman Catholic Church

The Cathedral of the Lord Good Jesus of the Remedies (Portuguese: Catedral do Senhor Bom Jesus dos Remédios) (Note: The cathedral is also known as Cathedral of the Lord of the Remedies or Cathedral of Afogados da Ingazeira.) is a religious building affiliated to the Catholic Church located in the city of Afogados da Ingazeira, in the state of Pernambuco in the Northeast region of Brazil.

The cathedral follows the Roman or Latin rite and serves as the mother church or main church of the Roman Catholic Diocese of Afogados da Ingazeira (Dioecesis Afogadensis de Ingazeira) that was created in 1956 through the bull "Qui volente Deo" of Pope Pius XII.

It is under the pastoral responsibility of Bishop Egidio Bisol. With the help of the municipal authorities, a 24-point lighting system using LED technology was installed in the cathedral in 2015.

== See also ==
- Catholic Church in Brazil
