= Diocese of Afogados da Ingazeira =

Catholic ecclesiastical territory

Coordinates: 7.7497°S 37.6377°W

Diocese of Afogados da Ingazeira Dioecesis Afogadensis de Ingazeira

Catholic
- Cathedral of Afogados da Ingazeira

Location
- Country: Brazil
- Ecclesiastical province: Olinda e Recife

Statistics
- Area: 11,034 km^{2} (4,260 sq mi)
- Population: Total; Catholics: (as of 2004); 342,207; 318,059 (92.9%)

Information
- Rite: Latin Rite
- Established: 2 July 1956 (70 years ago)
- Cathedral: Catedral Senhor Bom Jesus dos Remédios

Current leadership
- Pope: Leo XIV
- Bishop: Egidio Bisol
- Metropolitan Archbishop: Fernando Antônio Saburido, O.S.B.

The Roman Catholic Diocese of Afogados da Ingazeira (Latin: Dioecesis Afogadensis de Ingazeira) is a diocese located in the city of Afogados da Ingazeira in the ecclesiastical province of Olinda e Recife in Brazil.

== History ==
- July 2, 1956: Established as Diocese of Afogados da Ingazeira from the Diocese of Pesqueira

== Leadership ==
- Bishops of Afogados da Ingazeira (Latin Rite)
  - João José da Mota e Albuquerque (4 Jan 1957 – 28 Feb 1961), appointed Bishop of Sobral, Ceara
  - Francisco Austregésilo de Mesquita Filho (25 May 1961 – 13 Jun 2001)
  - Luis Gonzaga Silva Pepeu, O.F.M. Cap. (13 Jun 2001 – 11 Jun 2008), appointed Archbishop of Vitória da Conquista, Bahia
  - Egidio Bisol (7 Oct 2009–present)
