= Afogados da Ingazeira =

Municipality of Pernambuco, Brazil

Afogados da Ingazeira Município de Afogados da Ingazeira
- Municipality
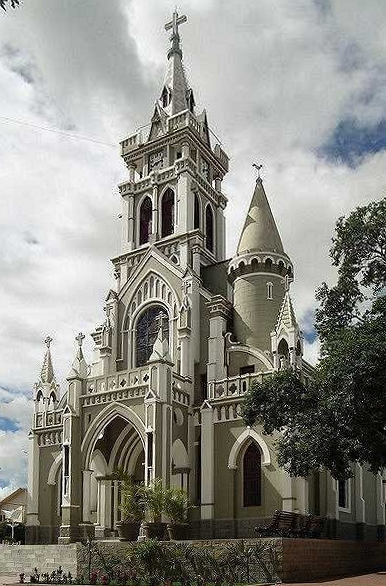
- Cathedral of Senhor Bom Jesus dos Remédios

- Flag Coat of arms
- Nickname: Princesa do Pajeú
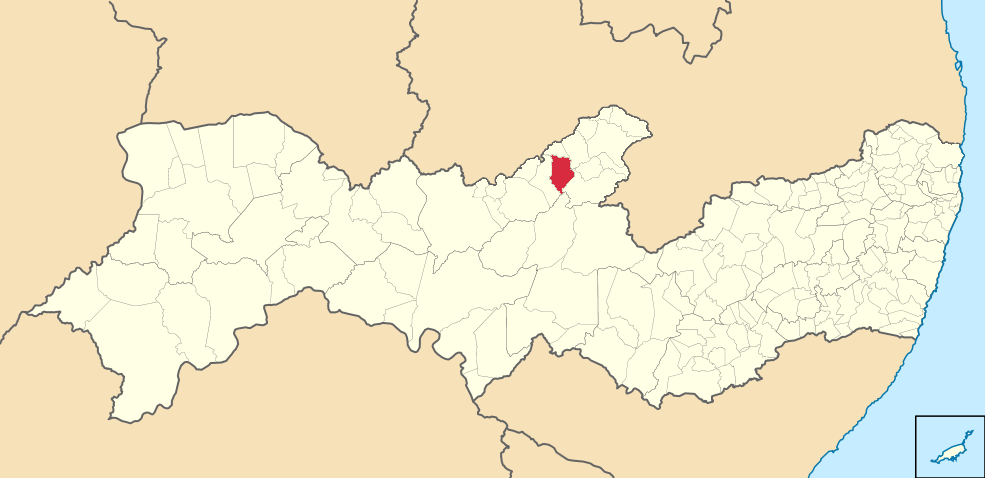
- Location of Afogados da Ingazeira in Pernambuco

- Location of Afogados da Ingazeira in Brazil
- Coordinates: 7°45′3″S 37°38′20″W
- Country: Brazil
- Region: Northeast
- State: Pernambuco
- Founded: July 1, 1909

Government
  - Mayor: Alessandro Palmeira de Vasconcelos Leite (PSB, 2021-2024)

Area
  - Total: 377.696 km^{2} (145.829 sq mi)
- Elevation: 525 m (1,722 ft)

Population (2022 Census)
  - Total: 40,241
  - Estimate (2025): 42,672
  - Density: 106.54/km^{2} (275.95/sq mi)
- Demonym: Afogadense
- Time zone: UTC−3 (BRT)
- Website: afogadosdaingazeira.pe.gov.br

Afogados da Ingazeira (Central northeastern portuguese pronunciation: [ɐfɔˈɡadu(s) dɐ ĩɡɐˈzeɾɐ]) is a Brazilian municipality in the state of Pernambuco. The estimated population in 2025 according to the IBGE was 42,672, and the total area is 378.031 square kilometres (145.959 mi^{2}). It has a population density of 97 inhabitants per square kilometer. In 2000, Afogados da Ingazeira had the second highest Human Development Index (HDI) in the Alto do Pajeú sertão region of Pernambuco state. Nonetheless, its score (0.683) was still below the state (0.718) and national (0.789) averages. The city is the seat of the Roman Catholic Diocese of Afogados da Ingazeira.

Afogados da ingazeira have one sister city

- Tabira, Brazil

== Geography ==
- State - Pernambuco
- Region - Sertão Pernambucano
- Boundaries - Solidão (N); Tabira and Iguaraci (E); Carnaíba (S and W);
- Area - 377.70 square kilometres (145.83 mi^{2})
- Elevation - 525 metres (1,722 ft)
- Hydrography - Pajeú River
- Vegetation - Caatinga hiperxerófila.
- Climate - Semi arid ( Sertão) - hot and dry
- Annual average temperature - 24.1 °C (43 °F)
- Distance to Recife - 380 kilometres (240 mi)

== Economy ==
The main economic activities in Afogados da Ingazeira are industry, commerce and agribusiness, especially farming of cattle, goats, sheep, chickens; and plantations of beans, corn and manioc.

=== Economic indicators ===
Population	GDP x(1000 R$).	GDP pc (R$)	PE
35.528	140.504	4.127	0.24%

Economy by Sector 2006

Primary sector	Secondary sector	Service sector
6.34%	17.44%	76.22%

=== Health indicators ===
HDI (2000)	Hospitals (2007)	Hospitals beds (2007)	Children's Mortality every 1000 (2005)
0.683	2	192	15.2

== See also ==
- List of municipalities in Pernambuco
