= São José do Egito =

Municipality in Pernambuco state, Brazil

- Municipality of Pernambuco, Brazil
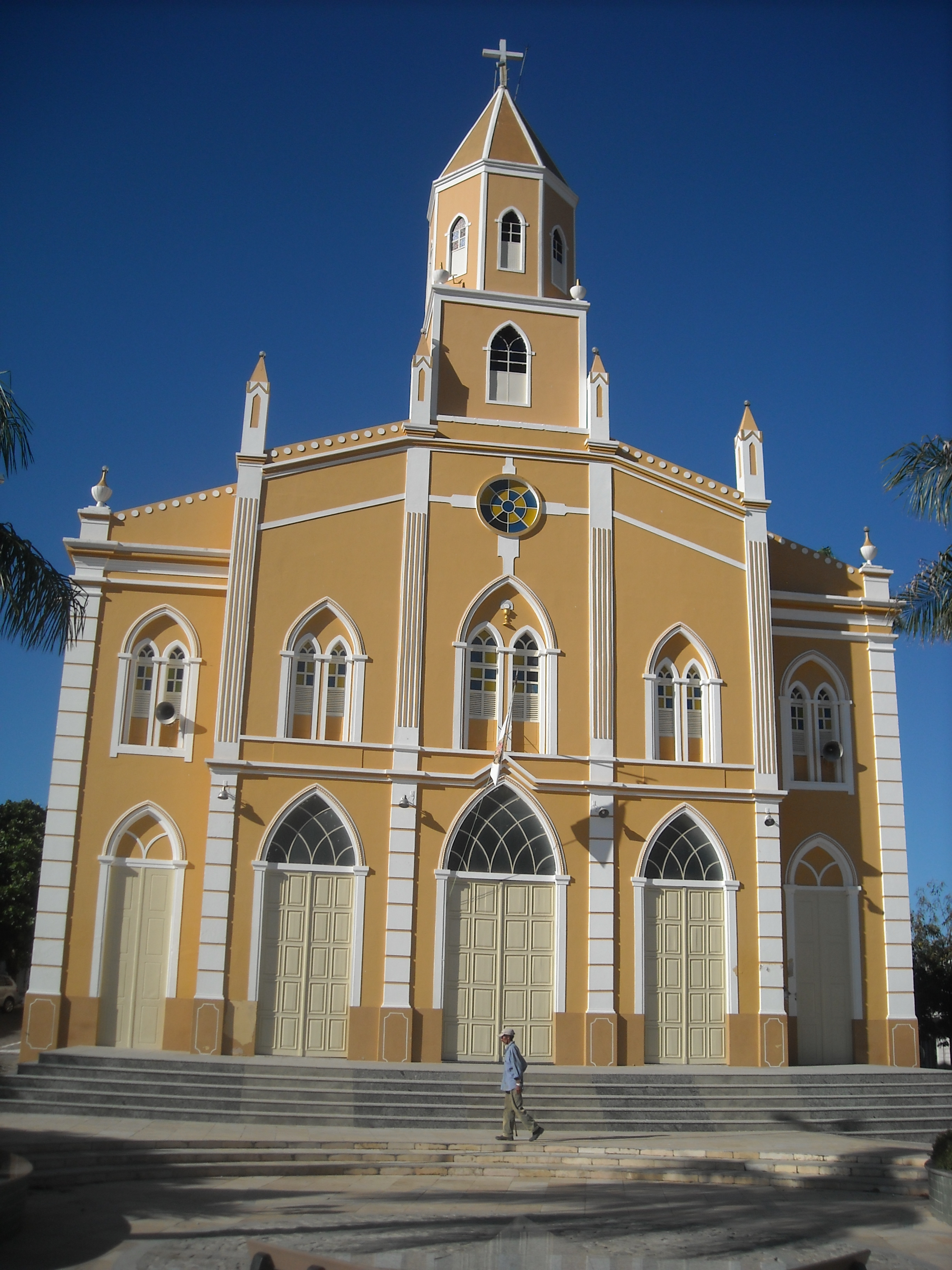
- St. Joseph's parish church in São José do Egito

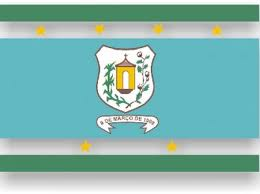
- Flag Coat of arms

- Location of São José do Egito in Pernambuco

- Location within Brazil Location within South America
- Coordinates: 7°28′44″S 37°16′28″W
- Country: Brazil
- Region: Northeast
- State: Pernambuco
- Founded: 9 March 1909

Government
  - Mayor: Fredson Henrique de Oliveira Brito (Republicanos) (2025-2028)
  - Vice Mayor: Jose Marcos de Lima (PODE) (2025-2028)

Area
  - Total: 774.037 km^{2} (298.857 sq mi)
- Elevation: 585 m (1,919 ft)

Population (2022 Census)
  - Total: 31,004
  - Estimate (2025): 32,508
  - Density: 40.05/km^{2} (103.7/sq mi)
- Demonym: Egipsiense (Brazilian Portuguese)
- Time zone: UTC-03:00 (Brasília Time)
- Postal code: 56700-000, 56705-000, 56710-000
- HDI (2010): 0.635 – medium
- Website: saojosedoegito.pe.gov.br

São José do Egito (Central northeastern portuguese pronunciation: [ˈsɐ̃w ʒuˈzɛ dŭ eˈʒitu]) is a city in the state of Pernambuco, Brazil. The population in 2025, according with IBGE was 32,508 and the area is 774.037 km².

== Geography ==
- State - Pernambuco
- Region - Sertão Pernambucano
- Districts - São José do Egito, Bonfim and Riacho do Meio
- Boundaries - Brejinho and Itapetim (N); Tuparetama and Ingazeira (S); Paraíba state (E); Santa Terezinha and Tabira (W)
- Area - 791.9 km²
- Elevation - 585 m
- Hydrography - Pajeú River
- Vegetation - Caatinga hiperxerófila
- Climate - semi arid - hot and dry
- Annual average temperature - 23.2 c
- Distance to Recife - 394 km

== Economy ==
The main economic activities in São José do Egito are commerce and agribusiness, especially farming of goats, cattle, sheep, pigs, chickens; and plantations of corn, beans and tomatoes.

=== Economic Indicators ===
Population	GDP x(1000 R$).	GDP pc (R$)	PE
31,792	119.315	3,916	0.20%

Economy by Sector 2006

Primary sector	Secondary sector	Service sector
16.45%	9.32%	74.23%

=== Health Indicators ===
HDI (2000)	Hospitals (2007)	Hospitals beds (2007)	Children's Mortality every 1000 (2005)
0.657	2	317	24.2

== See also ==
- List of municipalities in Pernambuco
