= Ingazeira =

Municipality of Pernambuco, Brazil

- Municipality of Pernambuco, Brazil
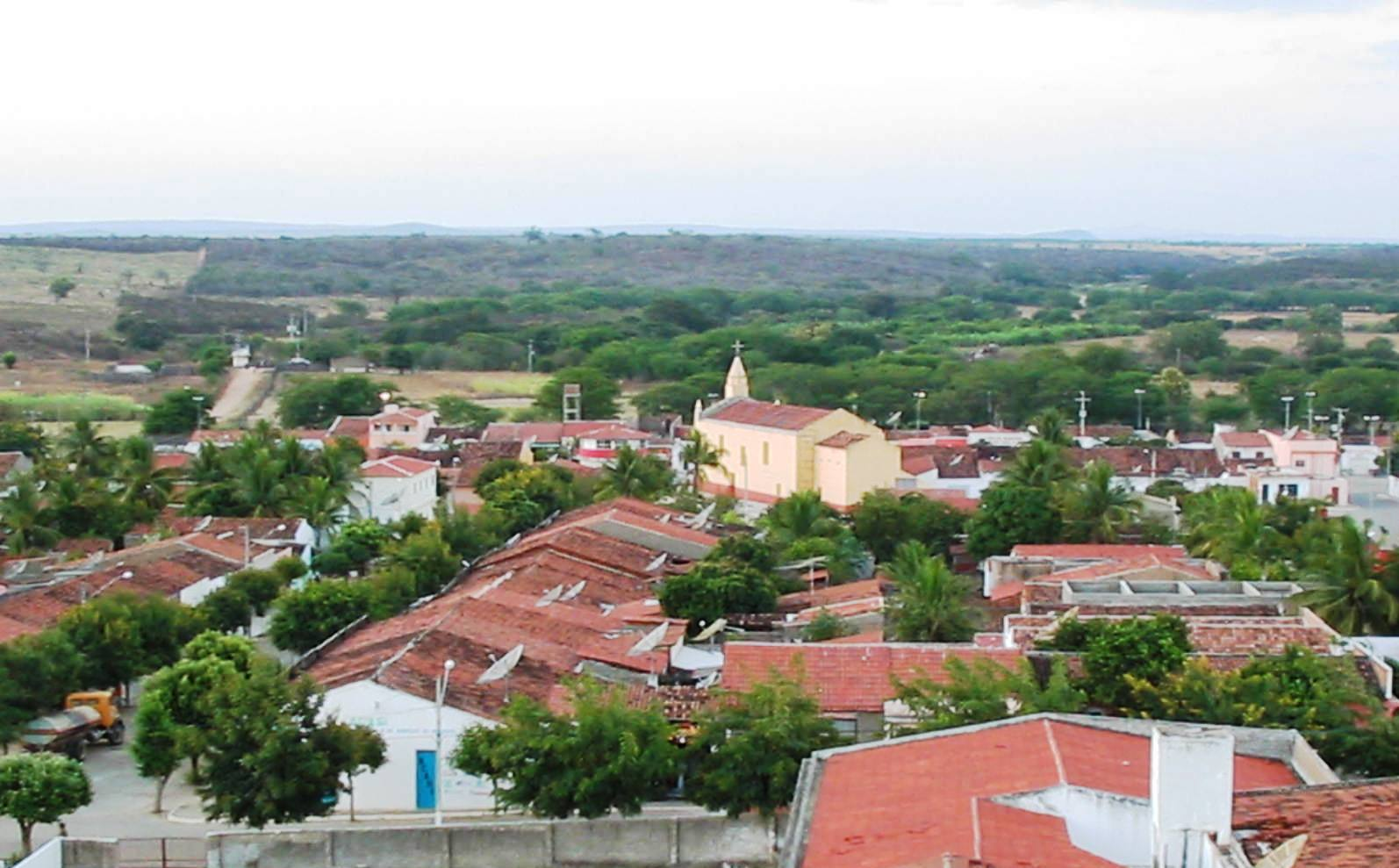
- Aerial view of Ingazeira

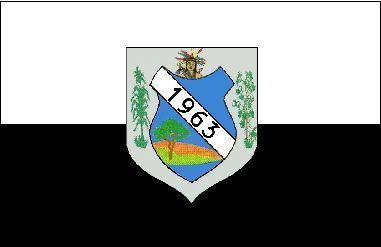
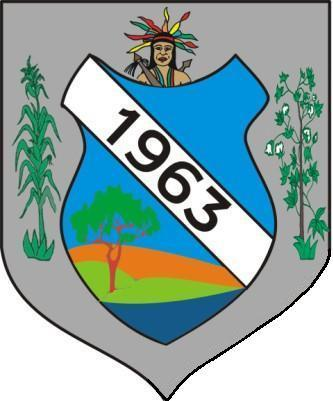
- Flag Coat of arms

- Location of Ingazeira in Pernambuco

- Location within Brazil Location within South America
- Coordinates: 7°40′33″S 37°27′36″W
- Country: Brazil
- Region: Northeast
- State: Pernambuco
- Founded: 20 December 1963

Government
  - Mayor: Luciano Torres Martins (PSB) (2025-2028)
  - Vice Mayor: Djalma Nunes de Lucena (PSB) (2025-2028)

Area
  - Total: 243.858 km^{2} (94.154 sq mi)
- Elevation: 534 m (1,752 ft)

Population
  - Total: 4,765
  - Estimate (2025): 4,975
  - Density: 19.56/km^{2} (50.7/sq mi)
- Demonym: Ingazeirense (Brazilian Portuguese)
- Time zone: UTC-03:00 (Brasília Time)
- Postal code: 56830-000
- HDI (2010): 0.608 – medium
- Website: ingazeira.pe.gov.br

Ingazeira (Central northeastern portuguese pronunciation: [ĩɡɐˈzeɾɐ]) is a city in the state of Pernambuco, Brazil. The population in 2025, according with IBGE was 4,975 inhabitants and the total area is 243.85 km^{2}.

== Geography ==
- State - Pernambuco
- Region - Sertão Pernambucano
- Boundaries - São José do Egito and Tabira (N); Iguaraci (S and W); Tuparetama (E).
- Area - 243.67 km^{2}
- Elevation - 534 m
- Hydrography - Pajeú River
- Vegetation - Caatinga hiperxerófila
- Climate - semi arid - (Sertão) hot
- Annual average temperature - 23.8 c
- Distance to Recife - 372.5 km

== Economy ==
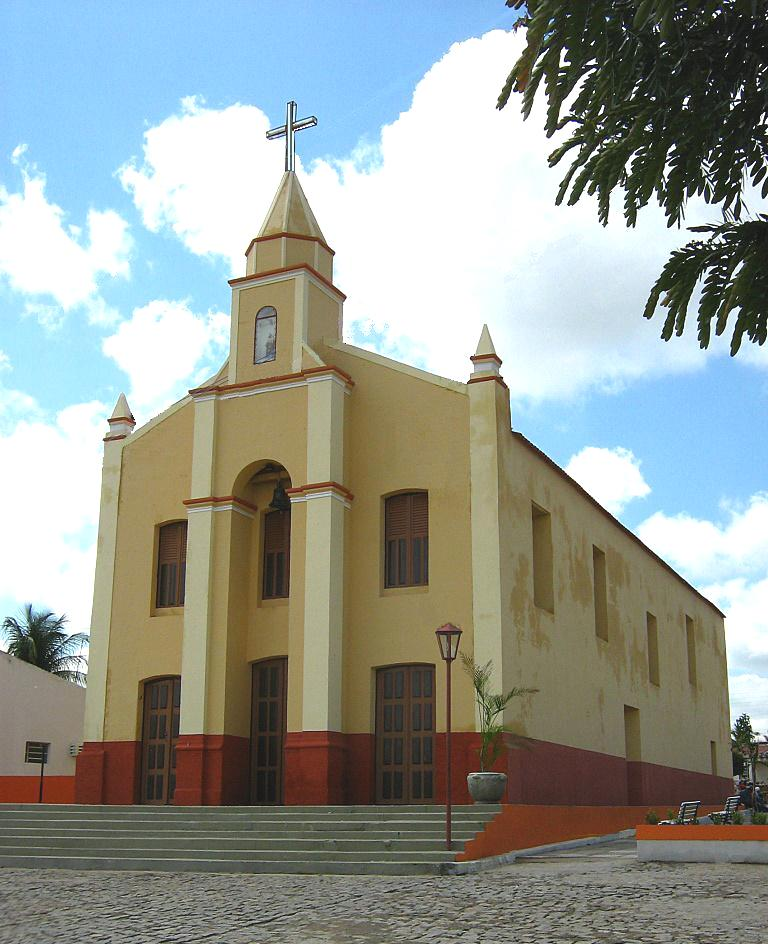
Saint Joseph Church

The main economic activities in Ingazeira are based in agribusiness, especially creation of sheep, goats, cattle, chickens; and plantations of corn, beans and tomatoes.

=== Economic Indicators ===
Population	GDP x(1000 R$).	GDP pc (R$)	PE
4.561	17.472	3.932	0.03%

Economy by Sector 2006

Primary sector	Secondary sector	Service sector
26.92%	8.32%	64.76%

=== Health Indicators ===
HDI (2000)	Hospitals (2007)	Hospitals beds (2007)	Children's Mortality every 1000 (2005)
0.638	1	4	13.3

== See also ==
- List of municipalities in Pernambuco
