= Piedade =

Piedade is Portuguese for piety and may refer to:

== Places ==
=== Brazil ===
- Piedade, São Paulo, a city in the State of São Paulo
- Piedade (Rio de Janeiro), a neighborhood of Rio de Janeiro
- Piedade do Ouro, a district of the municipality of Itapetim, in the state of Pernambuco.

=== Portugal ===
- Piedade (Lajes do Pico), a civil parish in the municipality of Lajes do Pico, Pico Island, Azores

=== India ===
- Piedade, Goa, a village in the state of Goa

== Persons with the surname ==
- Daniela Piedade (born 1979), Brazilian handball player
- Frederica Piedade (born 1982), Portuguese tennis player
- Wesley Karlos Piedade (born 1989), Brazilian association football player
