= Borborema Plateau =

Brazilian plateau

- Planalto da Borborema
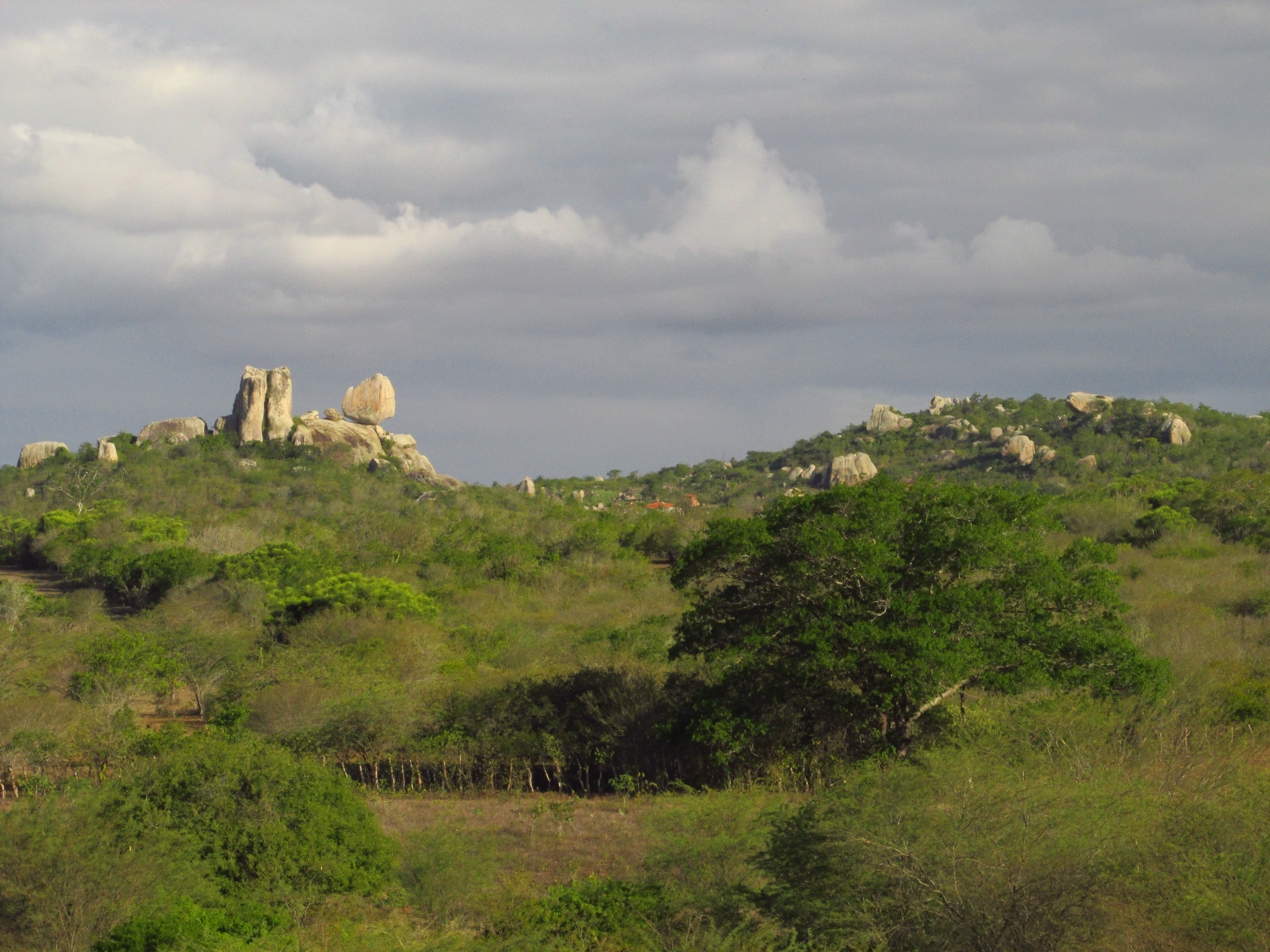
- Rock formations of the Borborema Plateau, Queimadas, Paraíba

Highest point
- Elevation: 1,260
- Coordinates: 7°S 37°W

Geography
- Location within Brazil
- Location: Alagoas, Pernambuco, Paraíba, Rio Grande do Norte, Brazil

The Borborema Plateau (Portuguese Planalto da Borborema, also known as the Serra da Borborema) is a plateau in northeastern Brazil which extends across the states of Pernambuco, Paraíba, and Rio Grande do Norte. The plateau is the northeasternmost portion of the Brazilian Highlands and is the most relevant watershed of its region. It ranges approximately 400 kilometres (250 mi) from north to south and 200 kilometres (120 mi) from east to west. More than 100 rivers originate from the plateau, including the Moxotó, Mundaú, Pajeú, Paraíba do Norte, Seridó, and Una.

The Borborema Plateau serves as an orographic barrier, despite its relatively low elevation, against the moist easterly winds of the Atlantic Ocean. Areas west of the plateau, which make up part of the sertão, are arid and prone to drought. The Pajeú River, the largest tributary of the São Francisco River, originates from the Borborema.

== Geology ==
The Borborema Plateau is part of a huge anastomosing shear zone. The plateau is composed primarily of igneous and metamorphic rock.
