= Piedade do Ouro =

- District
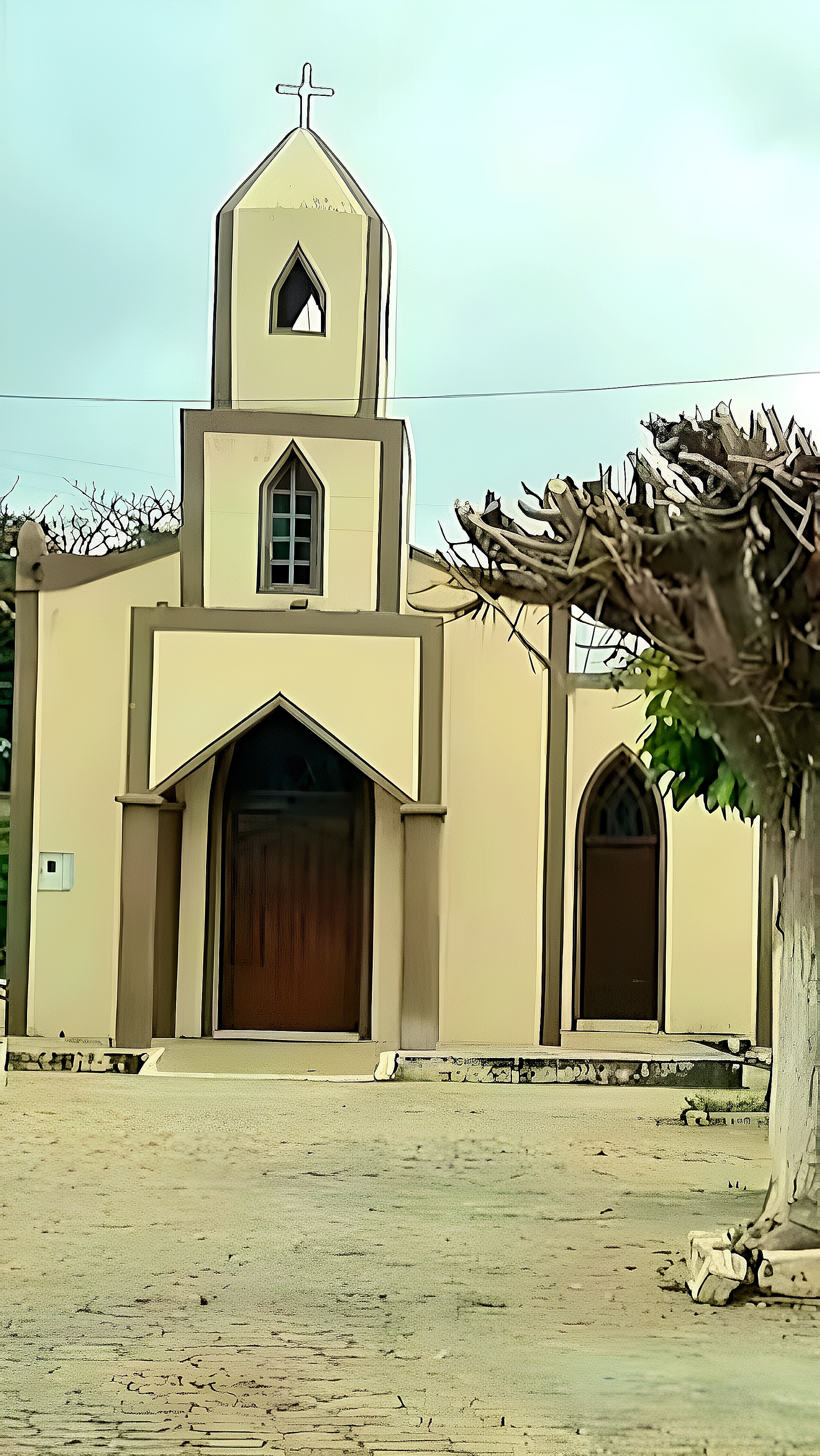
- Piedade do Ouro church

- Location in Brazil
- Coordinates: 07°17′35″S 37°13′54″W
- Country: Brazil
- State: Pernambuco
- Municipality: Itapetim

Piedade do Ouro, also known simply as Piedade, is a rural district in the municipality of Itapetim, in the state of Pernambuco, Brazil. it is notable for containing the northernmost continental point of the state of Pernambuco. Piedade do Ouro also is known for its history marked by the search for gold and metals between 1940s and 1980s, a period during which an abandoned gold mine, initially considered the third largest in Brazil, was exploited in the region.
