= Pajeú River =

Coordinates: 7.54786°S 37.28936°W

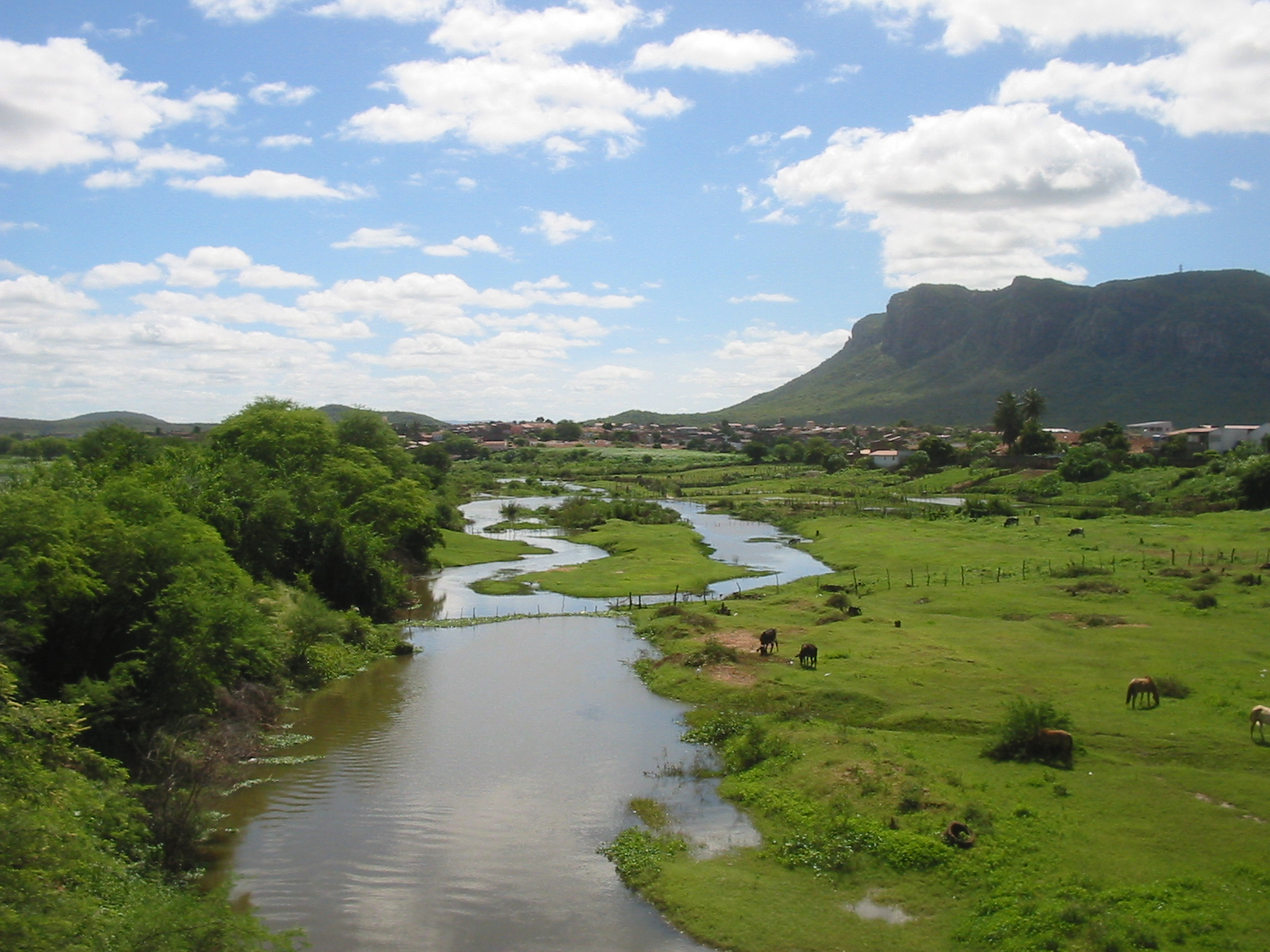
- Pajeú River in Serra Talhada

- Location within Brazil

Location
- Country: Brazil

Physical characteristics
- Mouth
  - location: São Francisco River
- Length: 353 km (219 mi)
- Basin size: 16,685.63 km^{2} (6,442.36 sq mi)

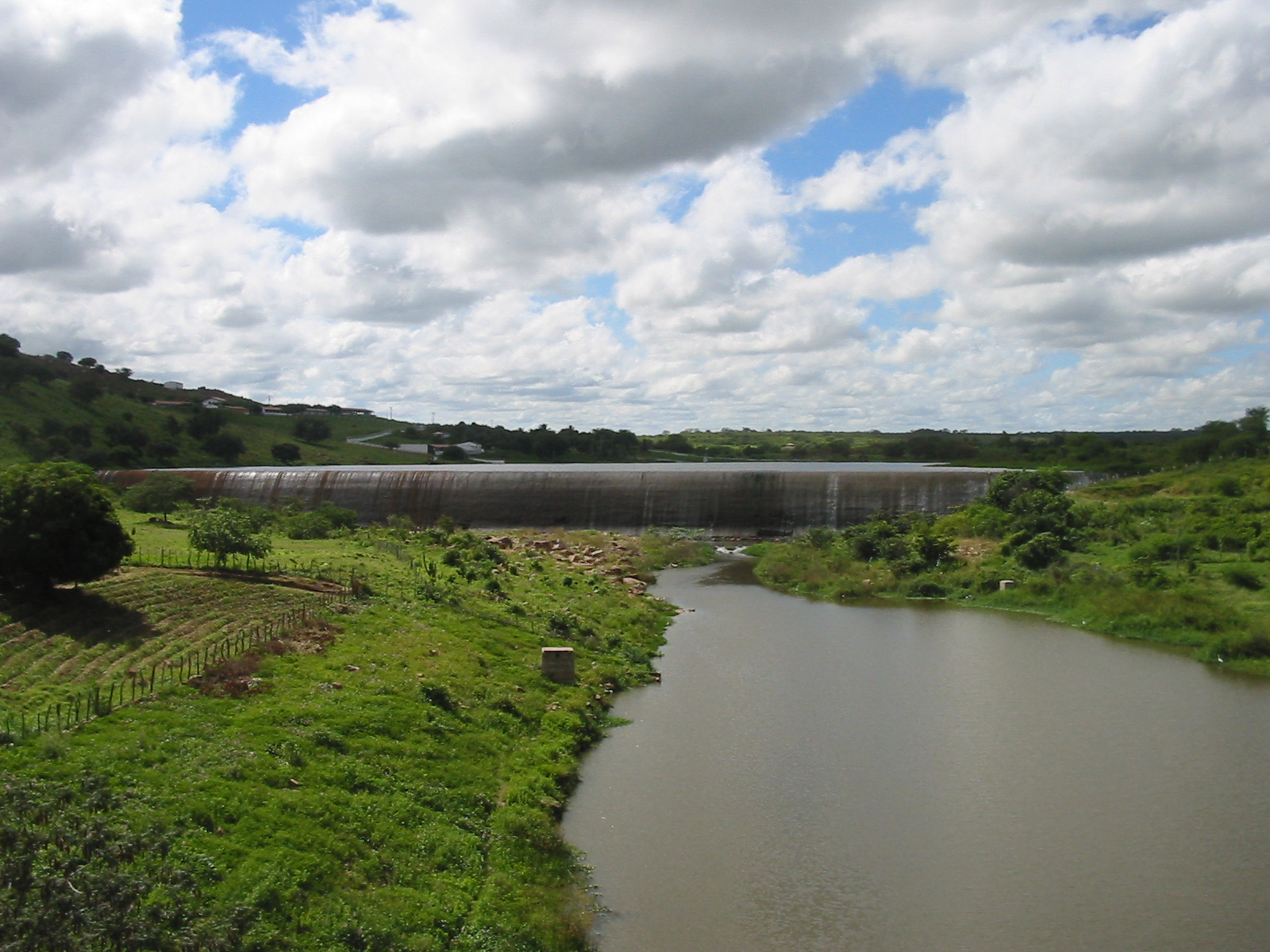
Jazigo Dam and the river

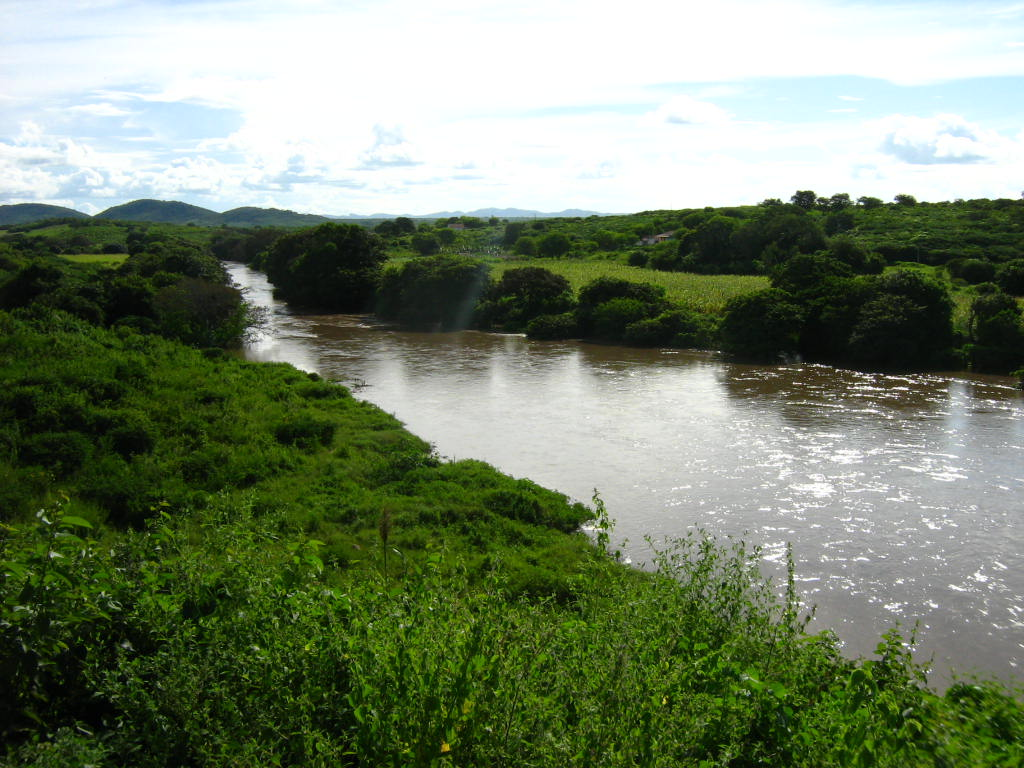
The river in Ingazeira

The Pajeú River is a tributary of the São Francisco River in the state of Pernambuco in northeastern Brazil. The Pajeú originates on the Borborema Plateau, and flows 353 kilometres (219 mi) southwest to join the São Francisco. It has a total watershed of 16,685.63 square kilometres (6,442.36 mi^{2}), which represents 16.97% of the total area of the state of Pernambuco.

== Etymology ==
The name of the river is of Tupi origin, and means "river of the witchdoctor".

== See also ==
- List of rivers of Pernambuco
