= Cotegipe =

Municipality of Bahia, Brazil

- Town
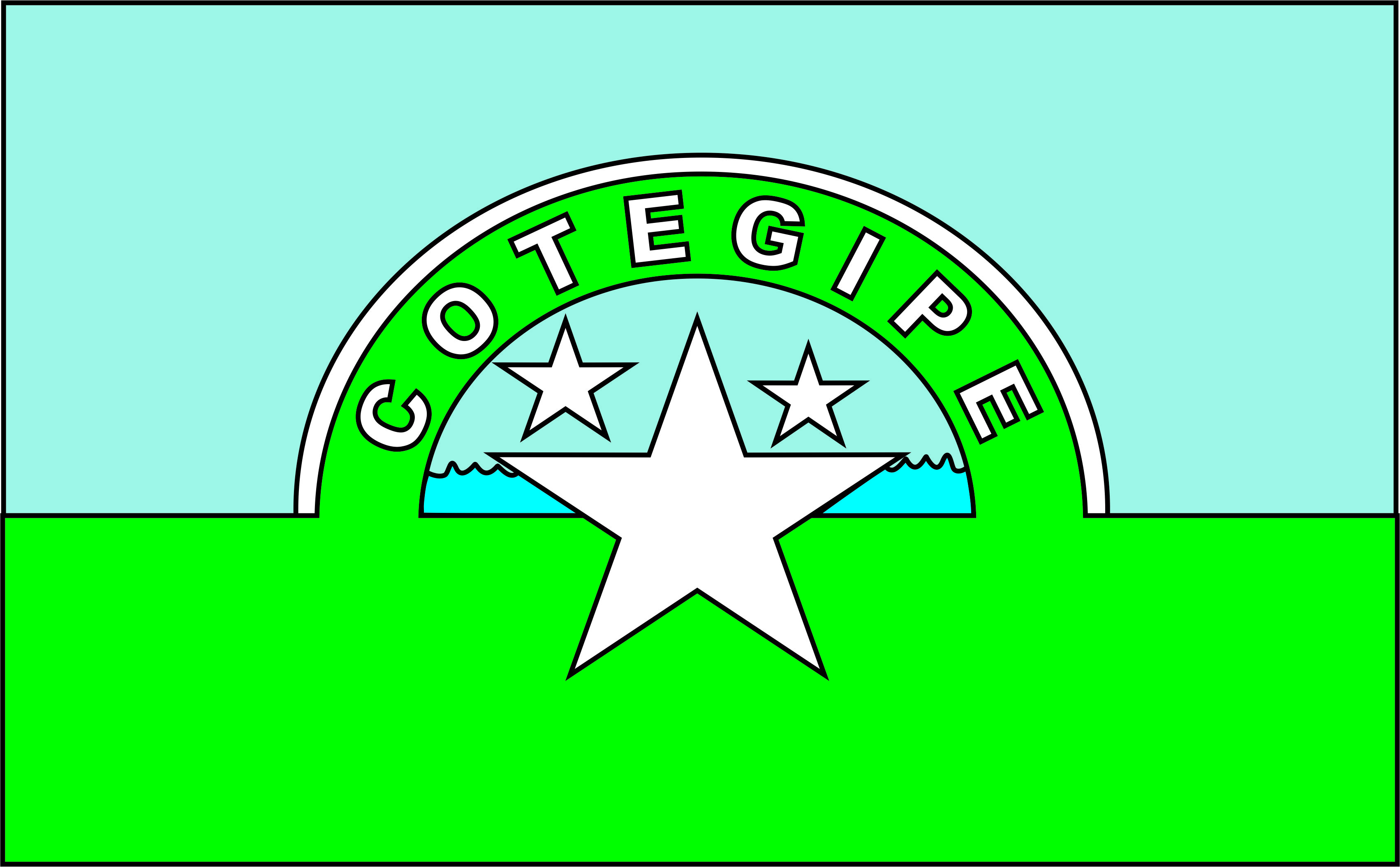
- Flag

- Cotegipe as shown within the map of Bahia

- Cotegipe as shown within the map of Brazil
- Coordinates: 12°01′40″S 44°15′28″W
- Country: Brazil
- State: Bahia
- Mesoregion: Extremo Oeste Bahiano
- Microregion: Cotegipe
- Settled: as Campo Largo in 1820

Area
  - Total: 4,018.594 km^{2} (1,551.588 sq mi)

Population (2020)
  - Total: 13,769
  - Density: 3.4263/km^{2} (8.8741/sq mi)
- Demonym: Cotegipano

GDP
  - Year: 2008 estimate
  - Total: R$ 47,592.895
  - Per capita: R$ 3,368.93

HDI
  - Year: 2000
  - Category: 0.607
- Time zone: UTC−3 (BRT)
- ISO 3166 code: BR-BA

Cotegipe (former Campo Largo) is a microregion and a municipality in the Brazilian state of Bahia in the north-east region of Brazil. Part of the Extremo Oeste Baiano mesoregion, the town was founded in 1820 and had a population of 13,769 as of the 2020.

== Municipalities in the Cotegipe microregion ==
- Angical
- Brejolândia
- Cotegipe
- Cristópolis
- Mansidão
- Santa Rita de Cássia
- Tabocas do Brejo Velho
- Wanderley

== See also ==
- List of municipalities in Bahia
