= Kambiwá language =

Extinct unclassified language of Brazil

Kambiwá
- Cambioá
- Native to: Brazil
- Region: Petrolândia, Pernambuco
- Ethnicity: Kambiwá
- Extinct: (date missing)
- Language family: unclassified

Language codes
- ISO 639-3: xbw
- Glottolog: kamb1239

Kambiwá (a.k.a. Cambioá) is an extinct unclassified language of Brazil. The Kambiwá still refer to their original language, and they preserve a few words of it today.

== History ==
=== Documentation ===
In 1935, 27 words of Kambiwá were recorded, followed by 25 words collected circa 1955; some of the words coincide between the two wordlists. A couple dozen words were further collected by Wilbur Pickering in 1961 from two people living in Barreira, Petrolândia, Pernambuco. However, by that time the language had become extinct.

== Classification ==
Apart from two apparent borrowings from Tupi, none of the words are relatable to known languages. Czech linguist Čestmír Loukotka (1968) characterized the language as unclassifiable due to lack of data.

== Vocabulary ==
=== Oliviera ms. ===
The following vocabulary was recorded by Carlos Estevão de Oliveira in Brejo dos Padres, Pernambuco and extracted from a manuscript nearly destroyed by termites by Loukotka and published in 1963. Loukotka had identified the wordlist as Pankararú, but it is actually Kambiwá.

gloss	Kambiwá
ostrich	lašikrã
potato	kafofa
sweet potato	guaska
woman	sikiurú
lightning	traikosã
man	porkiá
moon	tiũpanyé
fly	môka
palm tree	morõdõgo
penis	kiri
monkey	arinã
sun, god	panyé
giant anteater	murekaukaukri
tatu	arikîó
tatu-bola	kuarau
vagina	greleisão

=== Meader (1978) ===
In 1961, two word lists of Kambiwá were collected by Wilbur Pickering from elderly rememberers in Barreira, Petrolândia, Pernambuco. The word lists are published in Meader (1978).

Word list recorded from Manoel de Souza:

Portuguese gloss (original)	English gloss (translated)	Kambiwá
bebê indígena	indigenous baby	ˈkɔ́lúmì
fogo	fire	ˈtóɪ̀
fumo	smoke	ˈpɔ́ṛ̃ùi
mulher	woman	ˈšíˈtúrù
cachimbo	smoking pipe	ˈkákʷì / ˈkʷákʷì
gado	cattle	ˈkǫ́ną̀
homem branco (estrangeiro)	white man (stranger)	ˈtš̭ʸářίtš̭ʸà
negro	black man	tãˑˈkážúpì
ovelha	sheep	ˈtʸápɔsεřε̨
peba	six-banded armadillo	ˈr̃úpʌ̨̀ų̀
porco-do-mato	collared peccary (Pecari tajacu)	ˈtų́pàřà
raposa	fox	ˈfɔ́iàsà
tamanduá	tamandua	ˈfílípį̀
tatu-bola	Brazilian three-banded armadillo (Tolypeutes tricinctus)	ˈkʌ̨́ñíkį̀

Word list recorded from an elderly man named Tenoro:

Portuguese gloss (original)	English gloss (translated)	Kambiwá
fogo	fire	břázádò
fumo	smoke	pą̃ˈ húì
abelha	bee	ˈkóìm
água corrente	running water	bibi / ε
bebida alcoólica indígena feita de jurema-preta	indigenous liquor made from black jurema (Mimosa tenuiflora)	ʌ̨́žúˈkà
bebida alcoólica indígena feita de murici	indigenous liquor made from murici (Byrsonima crassifolia)	álúˈà
besta	beast	ˈtš̭ʸápàřú
homem branco	white man	ˈnεkřu
ovelha	sheep	púsɛ́ˈrɛ̨̀
peba	six-banded armadillo (Euphractus sexcinctus)	ˈgʷášínì
porco-do-mato	collared peccary (Pecari tajacu)	pǫį
veado	deer	ˈgʷą́wų̀

=== Pompeu (1958) ===
Estevão recorded a language in Brejo dos Padres, said to be spoken by the Indigenous people of the Serra Negra in Pernambuco. It was received by Thomaz Pompeu Sobrinho in 1940 and published 18 years later. The wordlist he collected is presented below.

Portuguese gloss (original)	English gloss (translated)	"Serra Negra"
sol	sun	kari
lua	moon	tyupanyé
trovão	thunder	traikozã
homem	man	porkiá
mulher	woman	sikiurú
macaco	monkey	arinã
cachorro	dog	sará
tatu-peba	six-banded armadillo (Euphractus sexcinctus)	tukuaranã, rapão
tatu-bola	Brazilian three-banded armadillo (Tolypeutes tricinctus)	kwaráu
tatu verdadeiro	nine-banded armadillo (Dasypus novemcinctus)	arikyó
tamanduá colete	southern tamandua (Tamandua tetradactyla)	muze káu káukrí
porco	pig	aleal
veado	deer	kwãú, gãcú
gado vacum	cattle	kõnã
cavalo	horse	tyaparú
ema	rhea	lashikrá
tabaco, fumo	tobacco, smoke	kupriô
bom	good	niré
rancho	ranch	poró
branco	white man	karikyá
negro	black man	tapsishunã
mosca	fly	moka
vaca	cow	tyanã
bezerro	calf	tyapatã
Deus	God	panyé

=== Barbosa (1991) ===
gloss	Kambiwá
smoking pipe made from jurema root	qüaquí
straight ceramic smoking pipe	matricó
deer	güaipú
striped hog-nosed skunk	jarita
armadillo	papú
six-banded armadillo	urupã
tamandua	pediú
fox	foiaça
Brazilian three-banded armadillo	caniquin
jaguar	mací
skirt made from Neoglaziovia variegata fiber	cateoba
maraca made from gourds	coité
caboclo	urucú
female caboclo	citurú
child	conomim
black man	tacajupe
smoke (tobacco)	porrú
fire	toê
gua [sic]	jehuá
moon	girací, irací
sun	guarací
Baccharis sylvestris	tupichaná
