= Monte Alegre =

Monte Alegre may refer to:

Places in Brazil:

- Campina do Monte Alegre, São Paulo
- Monte Alegre, Pará
- Monte Alegre, Rio Grande do Norte
- Monte Alegre dos Campos, Rio Grande do Sul
- Monte Alegre de Goiás, Goiás
- Monte Alegre de Minas, Minas Gerais
- Monte Alegre do Piauí, Piauí
- Monte Alegre de Sergipe, Sergipe
- Monte Alegre do Sul, São Paulo

or:

- Monte Alegre (ship)
