= Inajá =

Inajá may refer to:

== Places ==
- Inajá, Paraná, municipality in Brazil
- Inajá, Pernambuco, municipality in Brazil
- Inajá River, river in Brazil

== Plants ==
- Attalea maripa
