= Serra Negra (Brazil) =

Mountain range in Brazil

Coordinates: 9°59′S 37°52′W

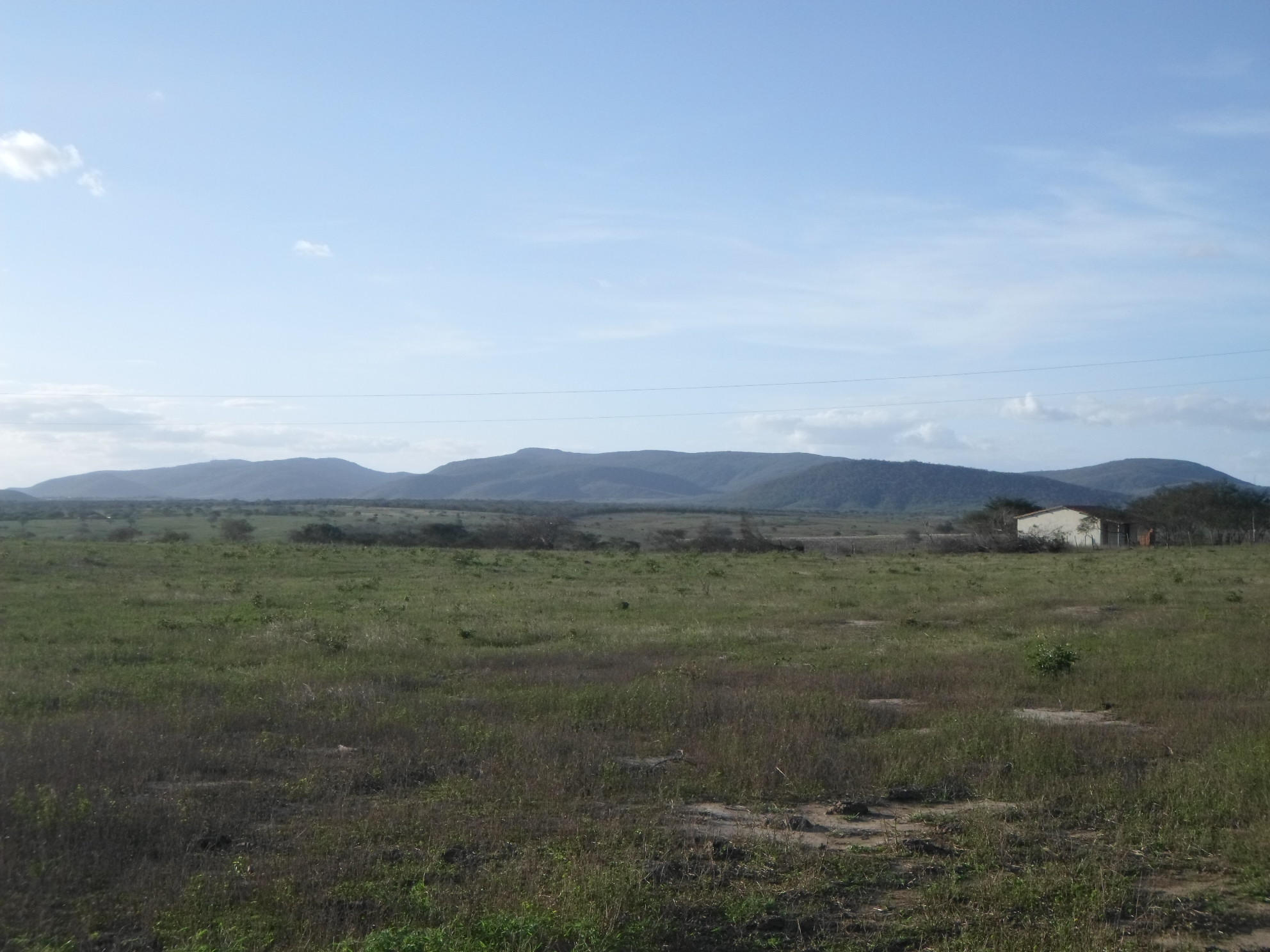

Serra Negra is a small mountain range on the border of Brazilian states Sergipe and Bahia. Its highest elevation is 742 m. The nearest town is Pedro Alexandre.

The range was designated a priority area for conservation and sustainable use when the Caatinga Ecological Corridor was created in 2006.

== See also ==
- Serra Negra Biological Reserve
