= Jatobá, Pernambuco =

Municipality of Pernambuco, Brazil

Jatobá
- Municipality of Pernambuco, Brazil
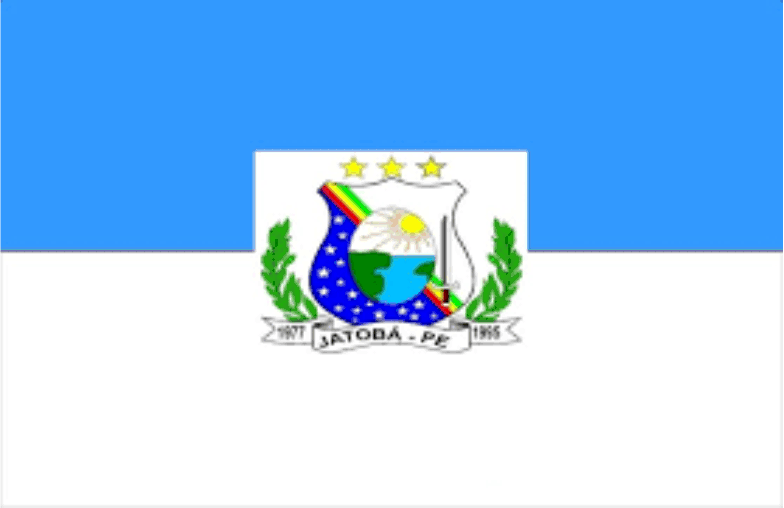
- Flag
- Etymology: Named after the jatobá tree
- Location of Jatobá in Pernambuco

- Location within Brazil Location within South America
- Coordinates: 9°10′58″S 38°16′8″W
- Country: Brazil
- Region: Northeast
- State: Pernambuco
- Founded: 26 September 1995

Government
  - Mayor: Rogério Ferreira Gomes da Silva (Republicanos) (2025-2028)
  - Vice Mayor: Eraldo Silva dos Santos (Republicanos) (2025-2028)

Area
  - Total: 277.862 km^{2} (107.283 sq mi)
- Elevation: 280 m (920 ft)

Population (2022 Census)
  - Total: 14,020
  - Estimate (2025): 14,477
  - Density: 50.46/km^{2} (130.7/sq mi)
- Demonym: Jatobaense (Brazilian Portuguese)
- Time zone: UTC-03:00 (Brasília Time)
- Postal code: 56470-000, 56475-000
- HDI (2010): 0.645 – medium
- Website: jatoba.pe.gov.br

Jatobá (Central northeastern portuguese pronunciation: [ʒɐtɔˈba]) is a city in the state of Pernambuco, Brazil. The population in 2025, according with IBGE was 14,477 inhabitants and the total area is 277.862 km^{2}.

== Geography ==
- State - Pernambuco
- Region - São Francisco Pernambucano
- Boundaries - Petrolândia (N); Alagoas state (S); Tacaratu (E); Bahia state (W)
- Area - 277.86 km^{2}
- Elevation - 297 m
- Hydrography - Moxotó River
- Vegetation - Caatinga hiperxerófila.
- Climate - Semi arid ( Sertão) hot
- Annual average temperature - 25.9 c
- Distance to Recife - 316 km

== Economy ==
The main economic activities in Jatobá are based in commerce and agribusiness, especially creation of sheep, goats, cattle and chickens.

=== Economic Indicators ===
| Population | GDP x(1000 R$). | GDP pc (R$) | PE |
|---|---|---|---|
| 14.425 | 37.611 | 2.726 | 0.063% |

Economy by Sector 2006

| Primary sector | Secondary sector | Service sector |
|---|---|---|
| 8.64% | 7.70% | 83.66% |

=== Health Indicators ===
| HDI (2000) | Hospitals (2007) | Hospitals beds (2007) | Children's Mortality every 1000 (2005) |
|---|---|---|---|
| 0.686 | 1 | 23 | 40.7 |

== See also ==
- List of municipalities in Pernambuco
