= Renaldo (footballer) =

Brazilian footballer (born 1970)

Personal information
- Full name: Renaldo Lopes da Cruz
- Date of birth: 19 March 1970 (age 56)
- Place of birth: Cotegipe, Brazil
- Height: 1.71 m (5 ft 7 in)
- Position: Forward

Senior career*
Years	Team	Apps	(Gls)
1991	Guará	0	(0)
1991–1993	Atlético-PR	12	(5)
1993–1996	Atlético Mineiro	64	(30)
1996–2000	Deportivo La Coruña	23	(5)
1997–1998	→ Corinthians (loan)	11	(1)
1998–2000	→ Las Palmas (loan)	50	(14)
2000–2001	Lleida	17	(8)
2001–2002	Extremadura	15	(1)
2002	América-MG	18	(5)
2003	Paraná	42	(30)
2004	FC Seoul	11	(1)
2004	Palmeiras	12	(0)
2005	Paraná	6	(1)
2005	Coritiba	21	(4)
2006	Náutico		
2006	Brasiliense		
2006	Vitória-ES		
2007	Ceilândia		
2008	Democrata		
2009	Capital-DF		
2009	Dom Pedro-DF		
2010	Serrano-PR		
2010	Capital-DF		
2011	Itaúna		
2011–2012	Vilavelhense		

International career
1996	Brazil	1	(0)
- * Club domestic league appearances and goals

Renaldo Lopes da Cruz (born 19 March 1970), known simply as Renaldo, is a Brazilian former footballer who played as a forward.

== Club career ==
Born in Cotegipe, Bahia, Renaldo played for more than 15 different clubs in his country, most notably for Atlético Mineiro. During his entire career, he missed only two penalty kicks – both in the same match, a 3–0 home win against Figueirense Futebol Clube – and left for Spain in 1996 to sign with Deportivo La Coruña.

Upon his arrival in A Coruña, Renaldo said, while describing himself as a player: "I am like Ronaldo, but with an "e"". However, he grossly failed to live up to expectations, also spending time with three other teams in the country (all in Segunda División). In the following decade, a humorous Spanish website called Renaldinhos y Pavones was created, containing anecdotes on several national and foreign players which caught the eye for various reasons.

In 2002, Renaldo returned to his country to play for América-MG. He continued to represent clubs in quick succession (he also had another spell abroad, in South Korea for FC Seoul), and finished his career in his 40s playing amateur football.

== International career ==
In 1996, he earned his sole cap for the Brazil national team.
