= Petrolândia =

Municipality of Pernambuco, Brazil

- Municipality of Pernambuco, Brazil
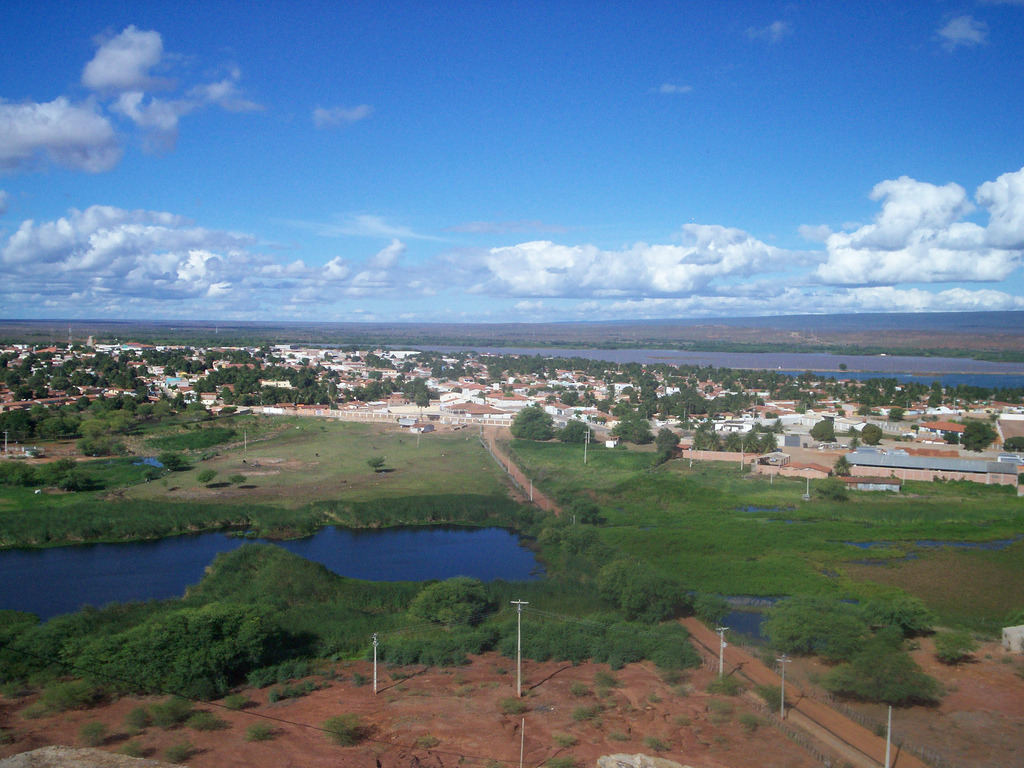
- Aerial view of Petrolândia

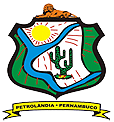
- Coat of arms
- Etymology: Meaning "Land of Pedro", in honor of Emperor Pedro II
- Location of Petrolândia in Pernambuco

- Location within Brazil Location within South America
- Coordinates: 8°58′45″S 38°13′10″W
- Country: Brazil
- Region: Northeast
- State: Pernambuco
- Founded: 9 December 1938

Government
  - Mayor: Fabiano Jaques Marques (Republicanos) (2025-2028)
  - Vice Mayor: Rogerio Gomes de Sa (PSD) (2025-2028)

Area
  - Total: 1,056.589 km^{2} (407.951 sq mi)
- Elevation: 282 m (925 ft)

Population (2022 Census)
  - Total: 34,161
  - Estimate (2025): 36,104
  - Density: 32.33/km^{2} (83.7/sq mi)
- Demonym: Petrolandense (Brazilian Portuguese)
- Time zone: UTC-03:00 (Brasília Time)
- Postal code: 56460-000
- HDI (2010): 0.623 – medium
- Website: petrolandia.pe.gov.br

Petrolândia (Central northeastern portuguese pronunciation: [pɛtɾɔˈlɐ̃djɐ]) (Petroland, named in honour of Dom Pedro II) is a municipality in the state of Pernambuco, Brazil. It is in the São Francisco Region. Petrolândia has a total area of 1056.5 square kilometers and had an estimated population of 36,104 inhabitants in 2025 according to the IBGE. It has one of the largest GDP per capita of Sertão due to the location of one hydroelectric power plant, property of CHESF.

== Languages ==
The Kambiwá language, now extinct, was spoken in the village of Barreira in Petrolândia.

== Geography ==
- State - Pernambuco
- Region - São Francisco Region
- Boundaries - Floresta (N), Jatobá (S), Tacaratu (E) and Bahia state (W)
- Area - 1056.6 km^{2}
- Elevation - 282 m
- Hydrography - Moxotó River, tributary of São Francisco River
- Vegetation - Caatinga hiperxerofila
- Climate - semi-arid hot
- Annual average temperature - 25.7 c
- Main road - BR 232, BR BR 110, BR 316
- Distance to Recife - 430 km

== Economy ==
The main economic activities in Petrolândia are based in commerce, energy and transportation industry, plus primary sector especially fruits such as coconuts, bananas, goiaba; and creations of goats, sheep, bulls and chickens. The energy sector due to the presence of Chesf is the most important activity.

== Transport ==
From 1881 to 1964 Petrolândia was the terminus of a single track railway, known as the Estrada de Ferro Paulo Afonso. This railway was constructed to bypass rapids and waterfalls on the São Francisco River by linking the upper limit of navigation of the Lower São Francisco at Piranhas, with the lower limit of navigation of the Upper São Francisco at Petrolândia.

== Indicators ==
=== Economic Indicators ===
Population	GDP x(1000 R$).	GDP pc (R$)	PE
32.568	510.512	16.685	0.84%

Economy by Sector 2006

Primary sector	Secondary sector	Service sector
3.50%	73.73%	22.77%

=== Health Indicators ===
HDI (2000)	Hospitals (2007)	Hospitals beds (2007)	Children's Mortality every 1000 (2005)
0.688	1	58	16.3

== See also ==
- List of municipalities in Pernambuco
