= Pimba (disambiguation) =

Pimba is a type of Portuguese music.

Pimba or PIMBA can also refer to:

- Pimba, South Australia, a settlement in Australia
- Pennsylvania Interscholastic Marching Band Association

== People with the name ==
- Gabriel Pimba (born 1990), Brazilian footballer
