= Cantidiano Valqueiro Barros Private Natural Heritage Reserve =

Protected area in Pernambuco, Brazil

- Reserva Particulare do Patrimônio Natural Cantidiano Valgueiro de Carvalho Barros
- Location within Brazil
- Nearest city: Floresta, Pernambuco
- Coordinates: 8.480821°S 38.471926°W
- Area: 285 hectares (700 acres)
- Designation: Private natural heritage reserve
- Created: 3 January 2003
- Administrator: (Private) Chico Mendes Institute for Biodiversity Conservation

The Cantidiano Valqueiro Barros Private Natural Heritage Reserve (Portuguese: Reserva Particulare do Patrimônio Natural Cantidiano Valgueiro de Carvalho Barros) is a private natural heritage reserve in the state of Pernambuco, Brazil. It protects an area of dry caatinga vegetation.

== Location ==
The Cantidiano Valqueiro Barros Private Natural Heritage Reserve is in the municipality of Floresta, Pernambuco. It has an area of 285 hectares (700 acres), part of the 1,972 hectares (4,870 acres) Fazenda Taboleiro Comprido.

== History ==
The owner of the Tabuleiro Comprido farm, Natanael Valgueiro Barros, was opposed to hunting and deforestation. He raised cattle, sheep and goats on the land, which also supports a flock of emus, now much reduced in size by hunters. The National Institute for Colonization and Agrarian Reform (INCRA) declared that the farm was unproductive, and threatened to expropriate and develop it. The environmental group SOS Caatinga and others helped with a campaign against INCRA's proposal, calling it an environmental disaster to clear the well-preserved caatinga. They gained the support of the federal representative of the RPPN program in Pernambuco.

The Cantidiano Valqueiro Barros Private Natural Heritage Reserve was recognized by Romulus Melo, president of the Brazilian Institute of Environment and Renewable Natural Resources (IBAMA), by ordnance 177 on 31 December 2002. The ordnance was published on 3 January 2003. The RPPN is the second in the Pernambuco caatinga, the first being the Maurício Dantas RPPN. It became part of the Caatinga Ecological Corridor, created in 2006.

== Environment ==
The Köppen climate classification is Bs s'h', with a long dry season from April to October and a short rainy season from November to March. Average daily temperature is 27 °C (81 °F). Average annual rainfall is 519 millimetres (20.4 in). The reserve protects an area of caatinga vegetation, most of it found in depressions between the plateau areas. Plants species include Amburana cearensis, Anadenanthera colubrina, Aspidosperma pyrifoliam, Cnidoscolus quercifolius and various species of Croton, Mimosa and Cactus. Harris's hawk (Parabuteo unicinctus) and white-cheeked pintail (Anas bahamensis) were reported in the reserve in 2005.

== Sources ==
- Dantas, Sidnei de Melo; Pereira, Glauco Alves; Farias, Gilmar Beserra de; Brito, Manoel Toscano de; Periquito, Maurício Cabral; Pacheco, Gustavo Luis; Vasconcelos, Eduardo Siqueira Tenório de (March 2007), "Registros relevantes de aves para o estado de Pernambuco, Brasil", Revista Brasileira de Ornitologia (in Portuguese), 15 (1), archived from the original on 2016-11-04
- Ganem, Roseli Senna (2016), "Gestão integrada da biodiversidade: corredores, mosaicos e reservas da biosfera" (PDF), Conservação da Biodiversidade Legislação e Políticas Públicas (in Portuguese), archived from the original (PDF) on 2016-11-04
- "Ibama reconhece mais duas reservas particulares do patrimônio natural", Agência Brasil (in Portuguese), Empresa Brasil de Comunicação, 4 January 2003
- Leal, Fabricia Correia (2004), A guilda de plantas ornitofilas em una área de caatinge no município de Floresta-PE (PDF) (in Portuguese), Recife-PE, archived from the original (PDF) on 2016-11-04
- Menezes, Josélia (1 April 2003), ""Seu" Valgueiro, sertanejo e ambientalista, sim sinhô!", Folha do Meio Ambiente (in Portuguese), archived from the original on 4 November 2016
- RPPN Cantidiano Valgueiro de Carvalho Barros (in Portuguese), ICMBio: Chico Mendes Institute for Biodiversity Conservation
