= Aiuaba =

Municipality in Ceará, Brazil

Coordinates: 6°38′S 40°07′W

- Municipality
- Interactive map of Aiuaba
- Country: Brazil
- Region: Nordeste
- State: Ceará
- Mesoregion: Sertoes Cearenses

Population (2020)
  - Total: 17,493
- Time zone: UTC−3 (BRT)

Aiuaba is a municipality in the state of Ceará in the Northeast region of Brazil.

The municipality contains the Aiuaba Ecological Station, which attempts to protect an area of Caatinga dry forest. The municipality was designated a priority area for conservation and sustainable use when the Caatinga Ecological Corridor was created in 2006.

== See also ==
- List of municipalities in Ceará
