= Quixeramobim, Ceará =

Municipality in Ceará, Brazil

Quixeramobim
- Municipality
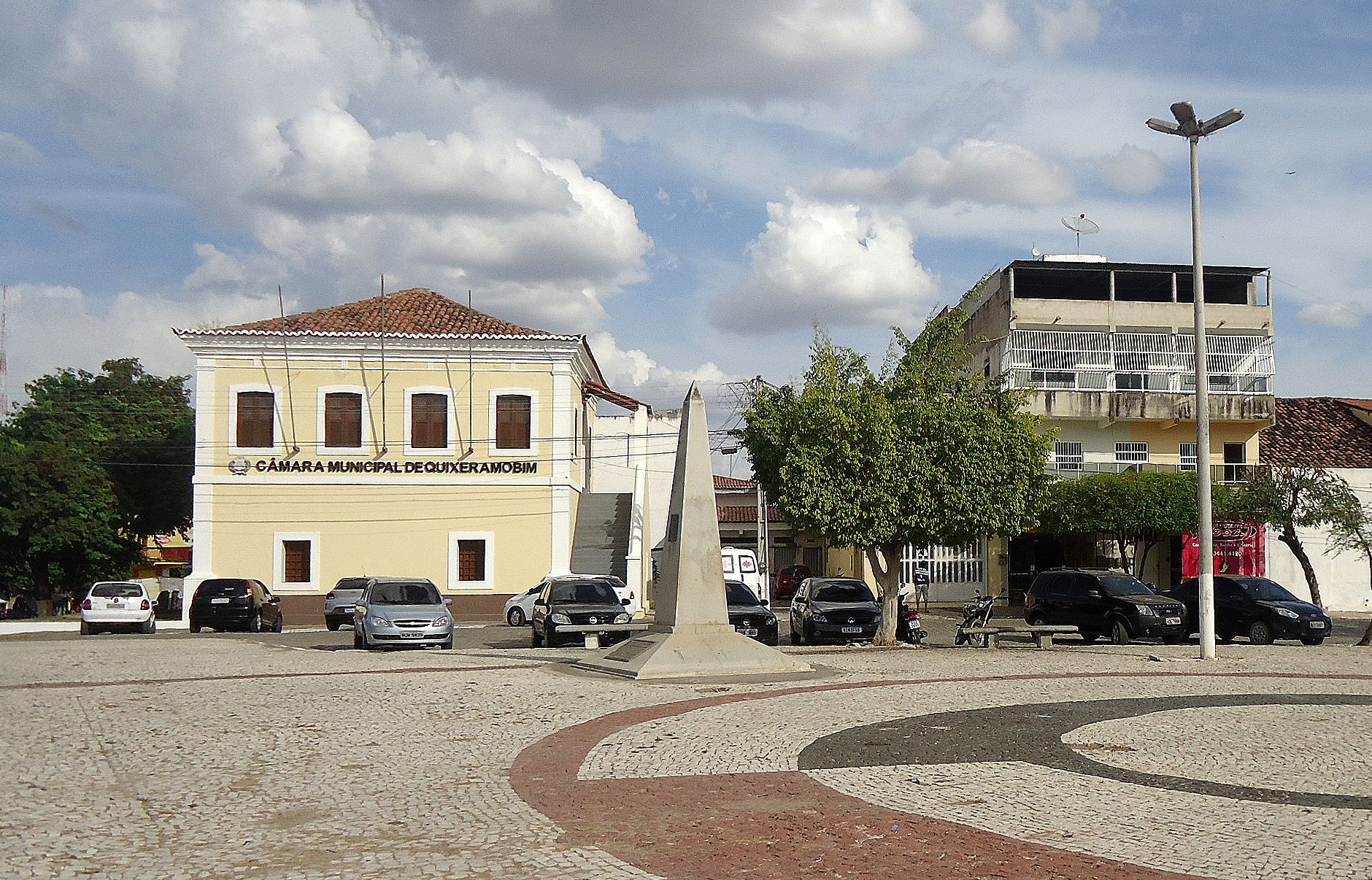

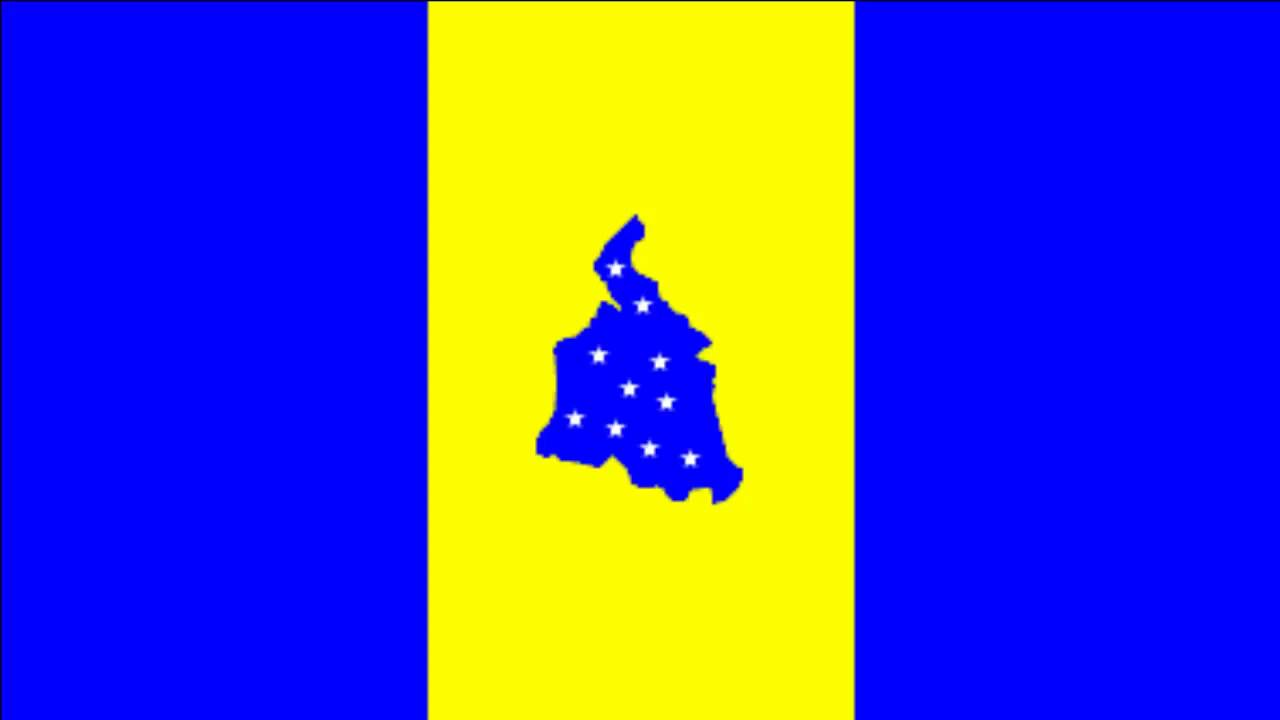
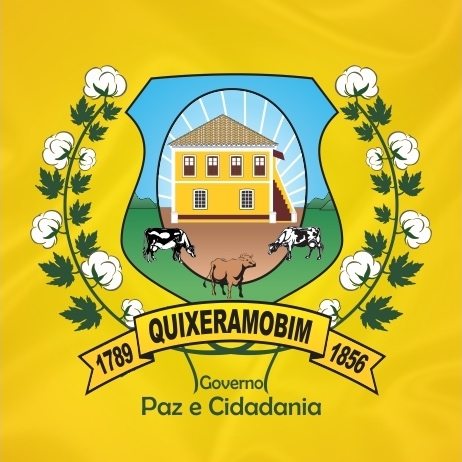
- Flag Coat of arms

- Location in Ceará state

- Location in Brazil
- Coordinates: 5°12′S 39°17′W
- Country: Brazil
- Region: Northeast
- State: Ceará

Population (2020)
  - Total: 81,778
- Time zone: UTC−3 (BRT)

Quixeramobim (formally Santo Antônio do Boqueirão de Quixeramobim; formerly Nova Vila do Campo Maior) is a municipality in central State of Ceará, northeastern Brazil. It has a population of about 81,778 (2020 est). The local biome is caatinga hiperxerófila.

== Climate ==
Semi-arid tropical warm with rainfall concentrated from February to April. The average temperature is 26–28 °C and the average annual rainfall is 499 mm.

The Paus Brancos district of the municipality was designated a priority area for conservation and sustainable use when the Caatinga Ecological Corridor was created in 2006.

Climate data for Quixeramobim (1981–2010)
Month	Jan	Feb	Mar	Apr	May	Jun	Jul	Aug	Sep	Oct	Nov	Dec	Year
Mean daily maximum °C (°F)	33.9 (93.0)	33.3 (91.9)	32.4 (90.3)	31.4 (88.5)	31.0 (87.8)	31.1 (88.0)	32.1 (89.8)	33.4 (92.1)	34.8 (94.6)	35.4 (95.7)	35.5 (95.9)	35.1 (95.2)	33.3 (91.9)
Daily mean °C (°F)	27.8 (82.0)	27.5 (81.5)	26.8 (80.2)	26.4 (79.5)	26.0 (78.8)	25.7 (78.3)	26.2 (79.2)	27.1 (80.8)	27.9 (82.2)	28.2 (82.8)	28.5 (83.3)	28.5 (83.3)	27.2 (81.0)
Mean daily minimum °C (°F)	23.8 (74.8)	23.6 (74.5)	23.2 (73.8)	22.9 (73.2)	22.5 (72.5)	21.8 (71.2)	21.8 (71.2)	22.2 (72.0)	22.9 (73.2)	23.4 (74.1)	23.8 (74.8)	24.0 (75.2)	23.0 (73.4)
Average precipitation mm (inches)	87.7 (3.45)	77.8 (3.06)	146.2 (5.76)	173.1 (6.81)	105.2 (4.14)	55.3 (2.18)	23.4 (0.92)	16.3 (0.64)	2.3 (0.09)	1.3 (0.05)	3.3 (0.13)	20.9 (0.82)	712.8 (28.06)
Average precipitation days (≥ 1.0 mm 0)	8	8	13	13	11	5	3	2	0	1	1	3	68
Average relative humidity (%)	63.0	66.4	71.9	73.3	72.9	66.8	59.3	53.4	52.0	53.1	54.8	58.1	62.1
Mean monthly sunshine hours	220.1	197.9	206.3	195.3	215.2	226.1	255.4	279.3	282.4	292.5	268.2	253.0	2,891.7
Source: Instituto Nacional de Meteorologia

== History ==
It was founded in the 17th century on lands adjacent to Rio Ibu (Quixeramobim) and became a municipality in 1755.

== Economy ==
The primary economic occupations are farming and ranching.

== Famous residents ==
- Iarley (born 1974), football player, World Champion at the 2006 FIFA Club World Cup
