= Belo Monte =

Municipality in Alagoas, Brazil

- Municipality of Alagoas, Brazil
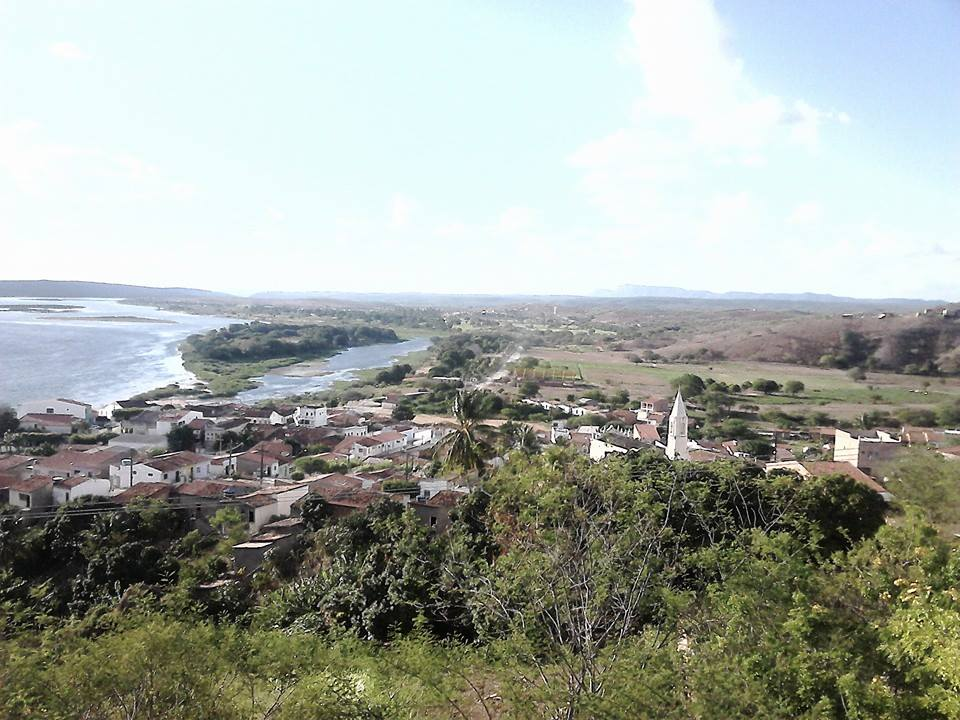
- View of Belo Monte

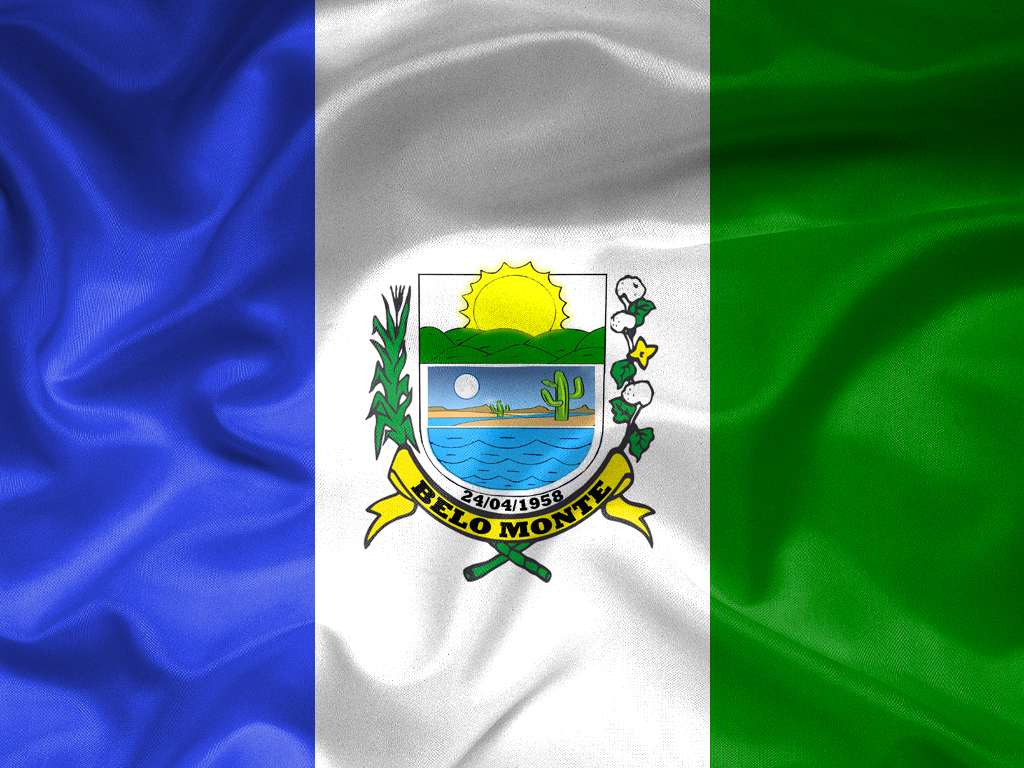
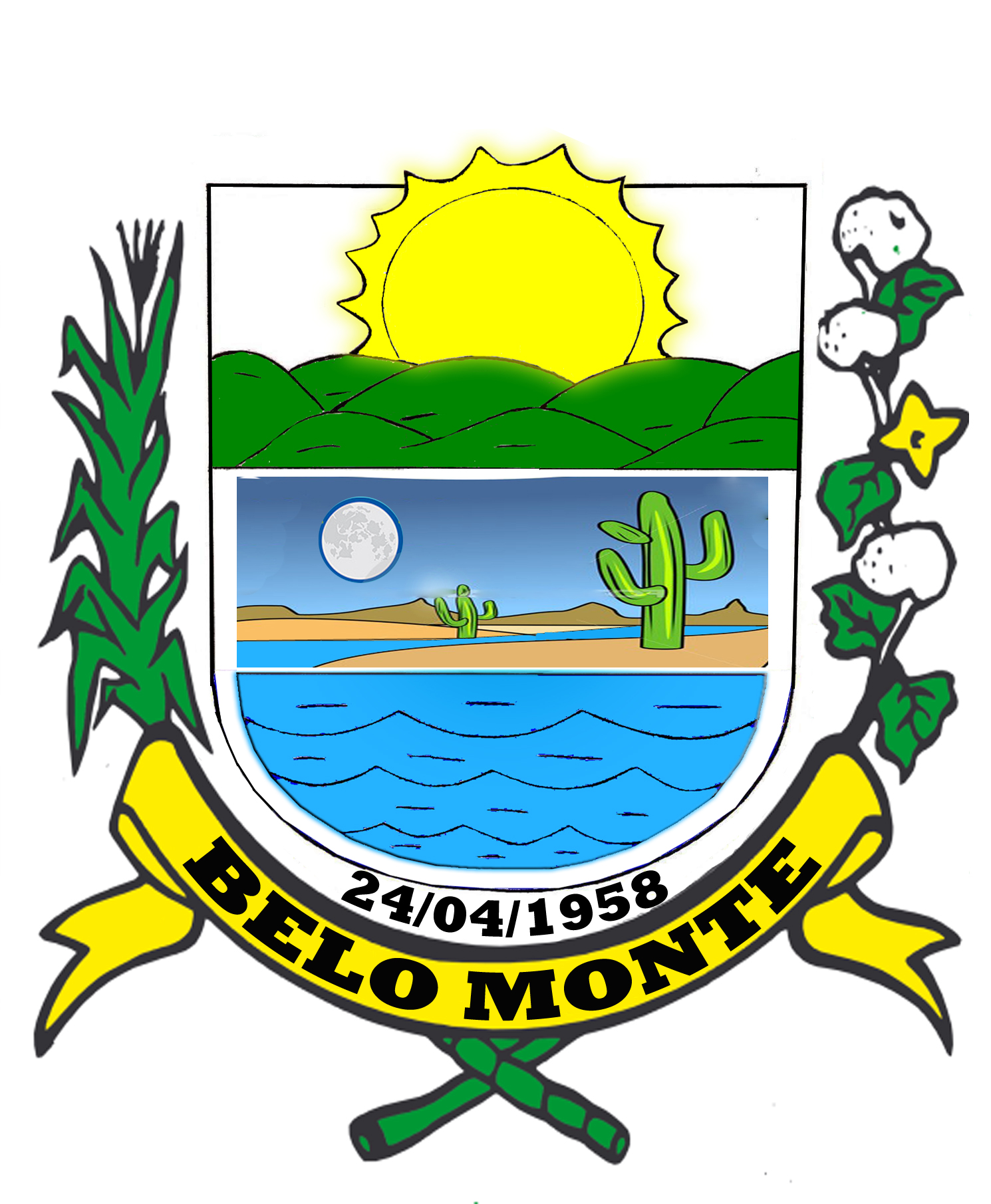
- Flag Coat of arms

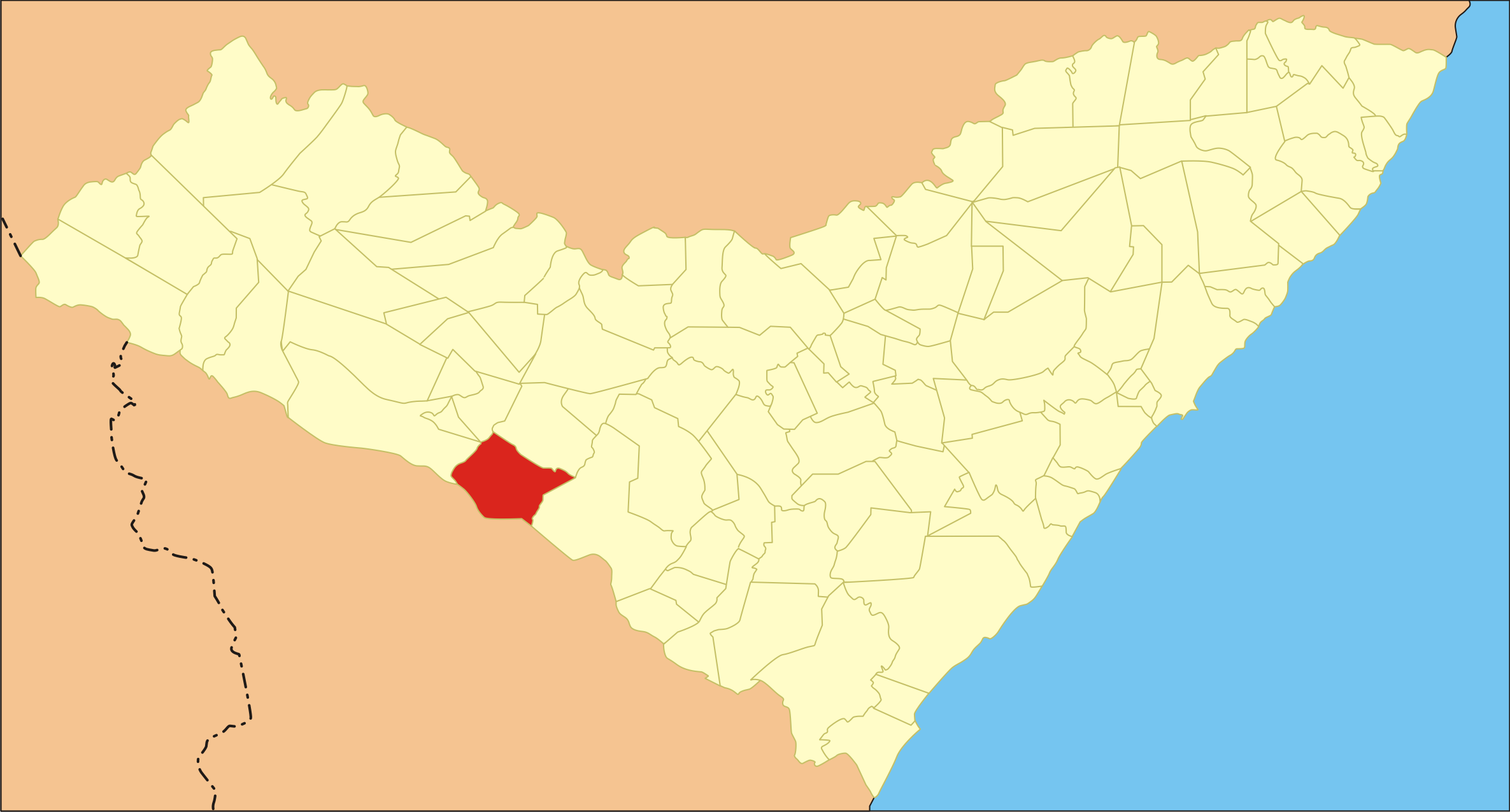
- Location of Belo Monte in Alagoas

- Location within Brazil Location within South America
- Coordinates: 9°49′40″S 37°16′48″W
- Country: Brazil
- Region: Northeast
- State: Alagoas
- Founded: 24 April 1958

Government
  - Mayor: Dalmo Augusto de Almeida Júnior (MDB) (2025-2028)
  - Vice Mayor: Antonio Jeremias Feitosa (MDB) (2025-2028)

Area
  - Total: 322.887 km^{2} (124.667 sq mi)
- Elevation: 30 m (98 ft)

Population (2022)
  - Total: 5,936
  - Density: 17.77/km^{2} (46.0/sq mi)
- Demonym: Belo-montense (Brazilian Portuguese)
- Time zone: UTC-03:00 (Brasília Time)
- Postal code: 57435-000
- HDI (2010): 0.517 – low
- Website: belomonte.al.gov.br

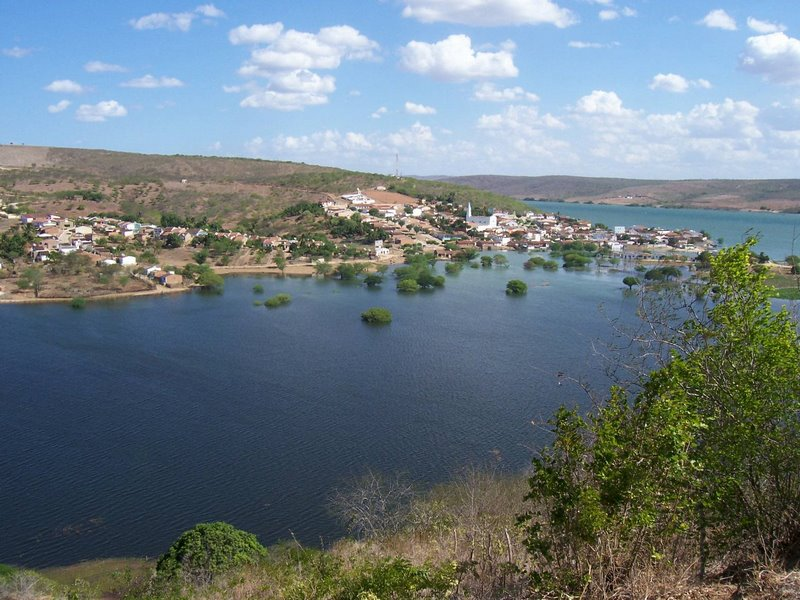

Belo Monte (Central northeastern portuguese pronunciation: [ˈbɛlʊ ˈmõti]) is a municipality located in the west of the Brazilian state of Alagoas. Its population is 6,710 (2020) and its area is 334 km^{2} (129 sq mi).

The municipality was designated a priority area for conservation and sustainable use when the Caatinga Ecological Corridor was created in 2006.

== See also ==
- List of municipalities in Alagoas
