= Caatinga Ecological Corridor =

Ecological corridor in northeast Brazil

- Corredor Ecológico da Caatinga
- Location within Brazil
- Coordinates: 8.655°S 38.029°W
- Area: 5,900,000 hectares (15,000,000 acres)
- Designation: Ecological corridor
- Created: 28 April 2006
- Administrator: Brazilian Institute of Environment and Renewable Natural Resources (IBAMA)

The Caatinga Ecological Corridor (Portuguese: Corredor Ecológico da Caatinga) is an ecological corridor in the caatinga biome of northeast Brazil.

== History ==
The decree creating the Caatinga Ecological Corridor was signed on 28 April 2006 by the Minister of the Environment, Marina Silva. The ordnance was published on 4 May 2006. It was the second officially recognized ecological corridor, the first being the Capivara-Confusões Ecological Corridor, created in March 2006. The corridor covers about 5,900,000 hectares (15,000,000 acres) of caatinga. It is designed to interconnect eight conservation units and 40 municipalities in the states of Pernambuco, Bahia, Sergipe, Alagoas and Piauí. It excludes urban areas.

The Brazilian Institute of Environment and Renewable Natural Resources (IBAMA) is responsible for management. It was expected that all municipalities would be subject to government regulations to conserve biodiversity and promote sustainable development, including replanting degraded areas. Priority areas for conservation, sustainable use and sharing of the benefits of biodiversity are Angical, Aiuaba, Betânia, Curaçá, Gararu/Belo Monte, Mirandiba, Paus Brancos (Quixeramobim), Queimada Nova, Remanso, Serra Negra, western Pernambuco, Petrolina, Raso da Catarina, Rodelas, Serra Talhada and Monte Alegre.

== Conservation units ==
Conservation units in the corridor when created were the Catimbau National Park, Serra Negra Biological Reserve, Raso da Catarina Ecological Station, Serra Branca / Raso da Catarina Environmental Protection Area, Cocorobó Area of Relevant Ecological Interest, Lagoa do Frio Municipal Nature Park, Cantidiano Valqueiro Barros Private Natural Heritage Reserve and Maurício Dantas Private Natural Heritage Ecological Reserve. It also included their buffer zones, interstices and areas to be created later.

== Sources ==
- Andrade, Juliana (5 May 2006), "Corredor Ecológico da Caatinga interliga oito unidades de conservação", Agência Brasil (in Portuguese)
- Ganem, Roseli Senna (2016), "Gestão integrada da biodiversidade: corredores, mosaicos e reservas da biosfera" (PDF), Conservação da Biodiversidade Legislação e Políticas Públicas (in Portuguese), archived from the original (PDF) on 2016-11-04
- Mattos, Marluza (2006), Ministério cria Corredor Ecológico da Caatinga (in Portuguese), Ministério do Meio Ambiente
