= Inajá, Pernambuco =

Municipality of Pernambuco, Brazil

Inajá
- Municipality of Pernambuco, Brazil
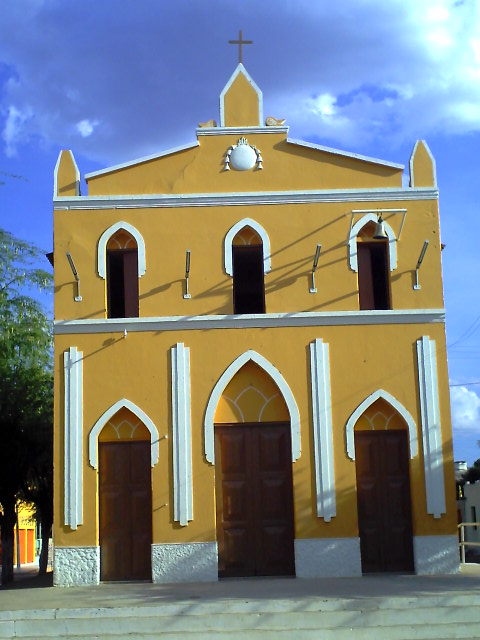
- Church of Saint Anthony of Padua

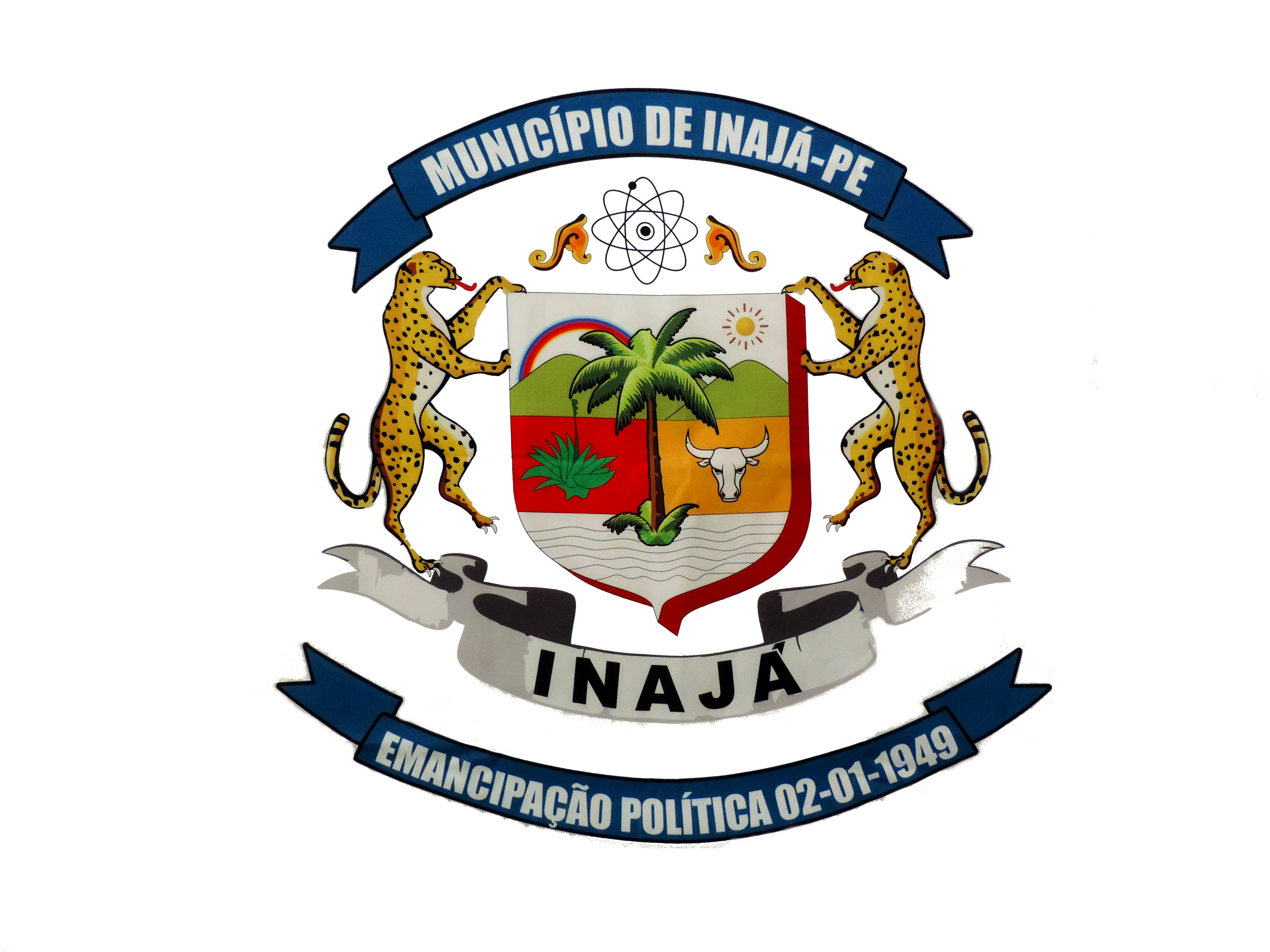
- Flag
- Etymology: Derived from indigenous origin meaning "small palm tree", referring to the carnauba trees on the banks of the Moxotó River
- Location of Inajá in Pernambuco

- Location within Brazil Location within South America
- Coordinates: 8°54′11″S 37°49′37″W
- Country: Brazil
- Region: Northeast
- State: Pernambuco
- Founded: 2 January 1949

Government
  - Mayor: Marcelo Machado Freire (Republicanos) (2025-2028)
  - Vice Mayor: Rafael Antônio de Araujo (Avante) (2025-2028)

Area
  - Total: 1,240.961 km^{2} (479.138 sq mi)
- Elevation: 355 m (1,165 ft)

Population (2022 Census)
  - Total: 25,603
  - Estimate (2025): 27,758
  - Density: 20.79/km^{2} (53.8/sq mi)
- Demonym: Inajaense (Brazilian Portuguese)
- Time zone: UTC-03:00 (Brasília Time)
- Postal code: 56560-000
- HDI (2010): 0.523 – low
- Website: inaja.pe.gov.br

Inajá (Central northeastern portuguese pronunciation: [inɐˈʒa]) is a city in the state of Pernambuco, Brazil. The population in 2025, according with IBGE was 27,758 inhabitants and the total area is 1240.96 km².

== Geography ==
- State - Pernambuco
- Region - Sertão Pernambucano
- Boundaries - Floresta and Ibimirim (N); Tacaratu and Alagoas state (S); Manari (E); Tacaratu (W).
- Area - 1182.16 km²
- Elevation - 355 m
- Hydrography - Moxotó River
- Vegetation - Caatinga hiperxerófila
- Climate - semi arid - (Sertão) hot
- Annual average temperature - 25.3 c
- Distance to Recife - 412.4 km

The municipality contains part of the 625 hectares (1,540 acres) Serra Negra Biological Reserve, a strictly protected conservation unit created in 1982.

== Economy ==
The main economic activities in Inajá are based in commerce and agribusiness, especially creation of goats, sheep, cattle, pigs, horses, chickens; and plantations of tomatoes and water melons.

=== Economic Indicators ===
Population	GDP x(1000 R$).	GDP pc (R$)	PE
14.729	52.704	3.755	0.088%

Economy by Sector 2006

Primary sector	Secondary sector	Service sector
23.65%	6.94%	69.41%

=== Health Indicators ===
HDI (2000)	Hospitals (2007)	Hospitals beds (2007)	Children's Mortality every 1000 (2005)
0.566	1	13	39.4

== See also ==
- List of municipalities in Pernambuco
