= Pankararú language =

Extinct language of eastern Brazil

Pankararú
- Brancararu
- Native to: Brazil
- Region: Pernambuco, Alagoas
- Ethnicity: 8.184 Pankararú (2014), ?1,648 Pankararé (2014)
- Extinct: by 1961
- Language family: Language isolate
- Dialects: Pankararú; ?Pankararé

Language codes
- ISO 639-3: paz – inclusive code (Pankararú); Individual code: pax – Pankararé
- Glottolog: pank1250 Pankararu pank1235 Pankarare
- Linguasphere: 89-CAA-a
- Map of Tacaratu, where the Pankararu language was spoken

Pankararú (Pancaré, Pankaré, Pancaru, Pankaruru, Pankarará, Pankaravu, Pankaroru, Pankarú, Brancararu) is an extinct language, probably a language isolate, of eastern Brazil. There are 6,000 ethnic Pankararú, but they all speak Portuguese. In 1961, only two elders could remember anything of the language. Today, they live in Brejo dos Padres and other villages of Tacaratu, Pernambuco State. The language was originally spoken between the Moxotó River and the Pajeú River.

In the 19th century the people split into multiple ethnic groups, including the Pankararú and the Pankararé. One quarter of the Pankararé retain their traditional religion. Their language, however, is unattested, and can only be assumed to be a dialect of Pankararu. According to Meader (1978), the Pankararu regarded themselves as belonging to the "Macarú" nation.

== Classification ==
Pankararú has no proven relatives and remains unclassified.

The original languages of the Jeriticó or Jiripancó, Koiupanká and Karuazu may have been related or identical to Pankararú. Kalankó (Cacalancó), with descendants now living in Água Branca, Alagoas, may have also been related to, or identical with, Pankararú.

== Vocabulary ==
=== Nimuendajú (1935) ===
Curt Nimuendajú recorded a number of words in the "Macarú" language in an unpublished manuscript dated 16 March 1935. His wordlist is presented below.

gloss	Macarú
God	sansê
beautiful	likim
tobacco	poi
salt	tuká
spoon	foiá
bee	arraó
water	ginicaçí
smoking pipe	matinadô
pig	aleal
ox	canarí
horse	tiaparú
sheep	pucheren
devil	fenêkia
dog	sará
dance clothing	tonan
dancer	praiá

=== Pompeu (1958) ===
Language variety from Pompeu (1958), originally collected by Carlos Estêvam:

Portuguese gloss (original)	English gloss (translated)	"Brejo dos Padres"
fogo	fire	obaí
água	water	jinikací; jatateruá; jai/já
brejo	swamp	ibiji/arôto
lagoa	pond	joo
terra	earth	jobají
pedra	stone	tóitú; ipá
sal	salt	tuká
cachimbo	smoking pipe	kuna kuní
cachimbo cerimonial	ceremonial pipe	matrinadô; matrigó
maracá	maraca	káma/kabá eyá
pinheiro	pine	burúti
menino	boy	jorã/óibo
parente	relative	gôyáji
irmã e prima	sister and cousin	dakatái
onça preta	black jaguar	tupé
maracajá	margay	gwariatã
porco	pig	tarací
mocó	rock cavy (Kerodon rupestris)	kewí
tatu-peba	six-banded armadillo (Euphractus sexcinctus)	kuriépe
boi	ox	kanarí
vaca	cow	tú
ovelha	sheep	pusharé; sumui íra
passarinho	small bird	iushií
pena	feather	tik
ovo	egg	aji
papagaio	parrot	umaiatá
periquito	parakeet	glyglilin
peixe	fish	kamijo
abelha	bee	axxaó
madeira, pau	wood, tree	dáka
flor	flower	barkíra
milho	corn	ta/mõni
tabaco, fumo	tobacco, smoke	põi; ajó
bonito	beautiful	limin

=== Carneiro ms. ===
Raimundo Dantas Carneiro included the following "Pankarurú" words in his manuscript, which were published by Čestmír Loukotka (1963). Cildo Meireles also collected some words around 1915; these were published by Estevão Pinto.

gloss	Carneiro in Loukotka	Meireles in Pinto
fermented beverage	ažuka	ajucá
ritual dance	toré	toré
ritual garment	tunã	tunã
mask	mumukabo	mumucabo 'part of the costume of praiás'
large clay pipe	kakikiá	quaquiquá
small clay pipe		quaqui
place for parties	pôrô	pôrô
name of a river	maranga	Maranga
sorcerer	praias	praiá
sorcerer title	šupuñum	xupunhum
sorcerer title	bôkôdô	pôcôdô
sorcerer title	andaruré	andaruré
sorcerer title	tita	tita
sorcerer title	pankaré	pancaré
Brejo dos Padres	Žeripankó	Jeripancó
Tacaratu	Takaikó	Tacaicô
Agua Maria Pedra	Žakuasí	
name of a stream	Žitó	Gitó
territory of the Pankararu	Kankalangó	Cancalangó
name of a hamlet	Ikó	Icó
name of a hamlet	Pákiu	Paquiú
name of a hamlet	Sôrôngo	Sorongo

=== Meader (1978) ===
Below is a 1961 word list of Pankarú (Pankararú) recorded in Brejo dos Padres by Wilbur Pickering from his informant João Moreno. The list is published in Meader (1978).

Portuguese gloss (original)	English gloss (translated)	Pankarú (Pankararú)
amarelo	yellow	ˈžúbʌ̀
pedra amarela	yellow stone	itapurʌŋga
boca	mouth	ūːřú kàˈtiŋ̄
minha boca	my mouth	sɛ̄ ūˈřú
bom	good	kátù
ele é bom	He is good.	ayɛ katu
o olho é bom	The eye is good.	sảːkàtú kʸả̀
vocês são bons	You (plural) are good.	pɛ̄ñékātù / pɛ̃ñékátù
branco	white	ˈtíŋgʌ́
buraco	hole	kʷàřà
cabeça	head	uukà
a cabeça é redonda	The head is round.	muukɩ̀(ː)
cabelo	hair	uŋkʸò
o cabelo é preto	The hair is black.	uŋkʸò àlóːkià
cachorro	dog	ítōˈlókʸà
caminho	road	pɛ
carne	meat	sóːō
casa	house	ókʰà
céu	sky	tšᶦakɩ / aʌ̨nsɛ
cobra	snake	fítš̭ˈàká / fítš̭iākà
coração	heart	(úpíˈá) ūpia kàtú asu
corda	rope	ˈmúsúřʌ̨̀nʌ̨̀
dedo grande	big finger	kų̀ʌ̨́ kàtέ gàsú
dente	tooth	(tʌ̨̄ˈíŋkàtī)
dia	day	ˈářà
ele / ela	he / she	àyέ
eles, elas	they	āìˈtá
este, esta	this	kʷa
eu	I	šɛʔ
faca	knife	kⁱsɛ
fogo	fire	ˈpo
fumo (tabaco)	smoke (tobacco)	pɔi
pedra furada	pierced stone	ítákʷàřà
ele furou a orelha	He pierced his ear.	oː màlɩ́ ásò
homem	man	aba
homem velho	old man	ábá ùmʌ̨̀
joelho	knee	àˈlų́
o joelho está mau	The knee is bad.	sātkālɩ́ ˈʔų́ː
língua	tongue	(mɛ̄āŋˈgā)
lua	moon	ˈžasì
lua cheia	full moon	kaiřɛ
lua nova	new moon	katiti
mãe	mother	sέʔžàʔ
mandioca	cassava	mʌ̨̀nˈdī
mão	hand	pɔ̄pitέkàí
mar	sea	pᵊřᵊˈnà
mau	bad	pùší
menina	girl	mítákų̄įˈʌ̨̀ / íādɛ̄doŋ̄kīˈà
menino	boy	íādɛ̄dùˈà
milho	maize	ávātì
moça	girl	kų̀įʌ̨̀ mùkú
moça velha	older girl	kų̀įʌ̨̀ fìlìwà
mulher	woman	kų̀įʌ̨̄
não	no	ų́hų̄
nariz	nose	tákʷí
meu nariz	my nose	séˈtį̀
nossos narizes (meu e seu)	our noses (inclusive)	iānέʔtį̀
seu nariz (de você)	your nose	šέˈtį́
seu nariz (dele)	his nose	sέˈtį́ àyὲ
noite	night	pīˈtų̀
nós, nosso	we, our	ìànέʔ
olho (pavɛořukya)	eye	(pavɛořᴜkʸa) sả̀ː
onça	jaguar	žáˈgʷà
orelha	ear	mōːkìhkʸà
pai (meu pai)	father (my father)	sέʔpāià
pedra	stone	ítà
pedra branca	white stone	itatiŋga
pedra preta	black stone	ítáʔų̀na
perna	leg	kóškì
preto	black	ʔų́nʌ̨̄
redondo	round	púʌ̨̄
sol	sun	kʷářásí
velho	old	ùmʌ̨̄
homem velho	old man	ábá úmʌ̨̀
moça velha	older girl	kų̀iʌ̨̀ fìlìwà
vós (vocês)	you	pὲˈñɛ̄
açúcar	sugar	dódᵊsākà
cabra	goat	kářkíá
camaleão	chameleon	fìˈkíˈá
canela	cinnamon	(kālɛ̄ˈʔί̨ʌ) kia
coxo	lame	kóš
dedo	finger	kų̄nˈkàtέ
farinha	flour	kítsʰià
feijão	bean	nátsākā
garganta	throat	gāɛ̄òˈŋkʸà
grosso	thick	sábóó
lagarto	lizard	šōá
macaxeira	cassava	aipį́
moreno	dark-skinned	pìˈtùnà
queixo	chin	tʔíŋkʷˈí
sim	yes	ʌ̨̅hʌ̨́
?	?	(pʌ̨̅ŋkārὲː)
