= Gabriel Pimba =

Brazilian footballer (born 1990)

Personal information
- Full name: Gabriel Lima Oliveira
- Date of birth: 4 July 1990 (age 36)
- Place of birth: Mansidão, Brazil
- Height: 1.73 m (5 ft 8 in)
- Position: Winger

Youth career
- Atlético Paranaense

Senior career*
Years	Team	Apps	(Gls)
2008–2014	Atlético Paranaense	15	(1)
2010	→ ABC (loan)		
2011	→ Fortaleza (loan)		
2012	→ Ventforet Kofu (loan)	12	(0)
2013	→ Ferroviária (loan)	4	(0)
2014–2015	Arapongas	11	(2)
2015	Campinense	7	(0)
2015–2017	Volta Redonda	9	(2)
2017	Jove Español		
2017–2018	PTSC	7	(0)
2018–2019	Gibraltar Phoenix	2	(0)

International career
2008–2009	Brazil U20	5	(3)
- * Club domestic league appearances and goals

Gabriel Lima Oliveira (born 4 July 1990), known as Gabriel Pimba, is a Brazilian former professional footballer who played as a winger.

== Club career ==
Gabriel Pimba began his career at Atlético Paranaense, scoring once in 15 games at the club over six years, during which time he went on loan to several clubs in Brazil in Japan. After leaving Paranaense, he played in the lower leagues in Brazil and in Spain for Jove Español, before joining Gibraltar Premier Division team Gibraltar Phoenix in summer 2018. He made his debut for Phoenix on 25 August 2018, against Europa.

== International career ==
Gabriel Pimba has five caps for the Brazil national under-20 football team, scoring three goals.
