= Remanso =

Municipality of Bahia, Brazil

- Municipality
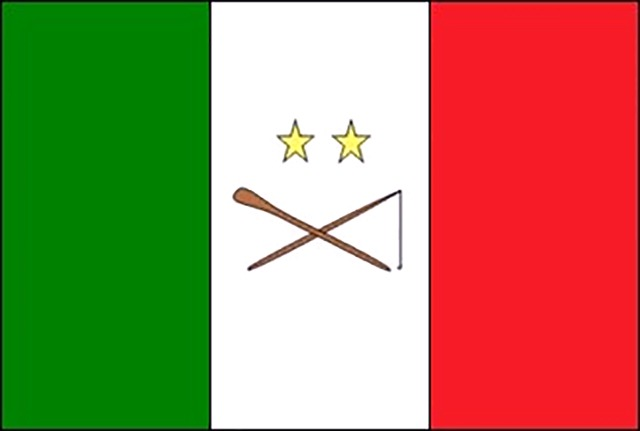
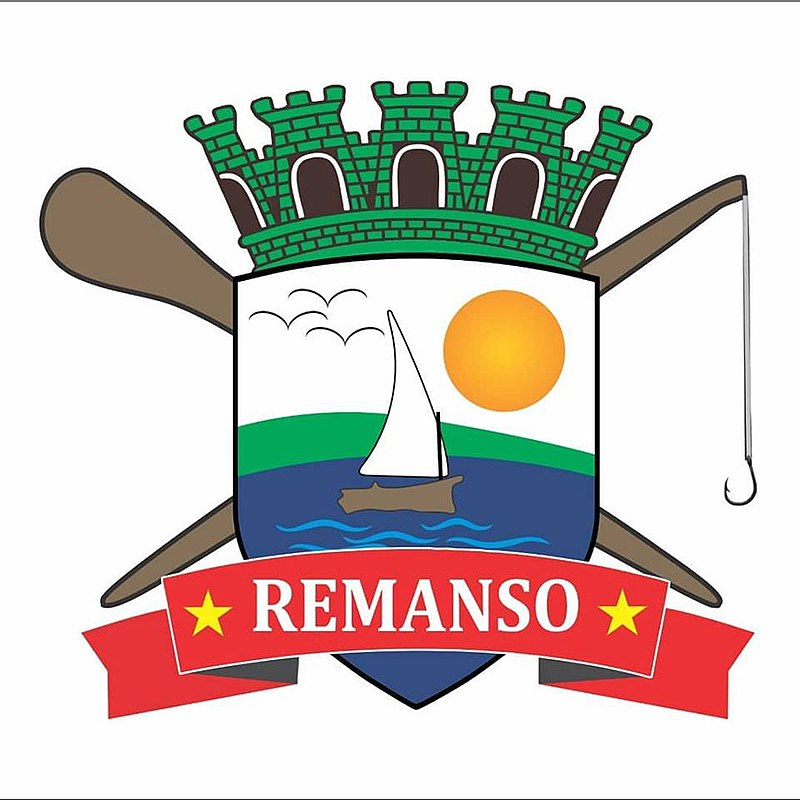
- Flag Coat of arms

- Location of Remanso in Bahia

- Location of Remanso in Brazil
- Country: Brazil
- Region: Northeast
- State: Bahia
- Founded: August 9, 1900

Area
  - Total: 4,683.4 km^{2} (1,808.3 sq mi)
- Elevation: 398 m (1,306 ft)

Population (2020)
  - Total: 41,170
  - Density: 8.791/km^{2} (22.77/sq mi)
- Time zone: UTC−3 (BRT)
- Postal code: 47200/000
- Area code: +55 74

Remanso is located in −9.62, −42 municipality in the state of Bahia in the North-East region of Brazil.

== Location ==
Backwater covers 4,683.4 km^{2} (1,808.3 mi^{2}), and has a population of 41,170 with a population density of 9 inhabitants per square kilometer. Remanso was relocated from its original location in 1974 with the construction of the Sobradinho Dam, which submerged the original municipality under the Sobradinho Reservoir. It consists of 2 districts: Remanso, the municipal seat, and Poços. The municipality was designated a priority area for conservation and sustainable use when the Caatinga Ecological Corridor was created in 2006.

== History ==
Remanso was originally inhabited by indigenous people of the Acoroase ethnic group. Refugees of armed conflicts in the nearby municipality of Pilão Arcado arrived in the 19th century. The area was fertile and due to its location on the Old Frank, provided a good site for cattle ranching and fishing. The area quickly attracted new residents who founded the town of Ville de Your Miss of Remanso of Pilão Arcado in 1857. This became an independent municipality on August 9, 1900 under the name of Remanso.

=== Relocation ===
Under Brazilian Federal Law n°. 10/77 of January 28, 1977 the municipality was relocated 4.3 miles from its original location in 1974 for the construction of the Sobradinho Dam. The new location, referred to as New Remanso, was constructed by Companhia Hidro Elétrica do São Francisco (São Francisco Hydroelectric Company). The municipality lost a quarter of its territory with the construction of the dam and the old city is now submerged under the Sobradinho Reservoir.

== Festivals ==
Remanso is noted for its micareta, an off-season celebration similar to the Brazilian Carnival. The micareta of Remanso attracts approximately 10M people annually. The municipality also holds the Your Lady Rosário Festival annually in October.

== Climate ==
Climate data for Remanso (1981–2010)
Month	Jan	Feb	Mar	Apr	May	Jun	Jul	Aug	Sep	Oct	Nov	Dec	Year
Mean daily maximum °C (°F)	32.0 (89.6)	31.9 (89.4)	31.4 (88.5)	31.6 (88.9)	31.1 (88.0)	30.4 (86.7)	30.2 (86.4)	31.1 (88.0)	32.8 (91.0)	33.9 (93.0)	33.3 (91.9)	32.3 (90.1)	31.8 (89.2)
Daily mean °C (°F)	27.1 (80.8)	26.7 (80.1)	26.7 (80.1)	27.0 (80.6)	26.4 (79.5)	25.4 (77.7)	25.4 (77.7)	25.7 (78.3)	26.8 (80.2)	28.2 (82.8)	28.1 (82.6)	26.9 (80.4)	26.7 (80.1)
Mean daily minimum °C (°F)	22.7 (72.9)	22.5 (72.5)	22.8 (73.0)	23.0 (73.4)	22.5 (72.5)	21.6 (70.9)	20.8 (69.4)	20.8 (69.4)	22.2 (72.0)	23.4 (74.1)	23.3 (73.9)	22.7 (72.9)	22.4 (72.3)
Average precipitation mm (inches)	125.0 (4.92)	110.6 (4.35)	125.3 (4.93)	60.8 (2.39)	9.0 (0.35)	2.2 (0.09)	0.7 (0.03)	1.2 (0.05)	2.3 (0.09)	21.3 (0.84)	74.0 (2.91)	89.0 (3.50)	621.4 (24.46)
Average precipitation days (≥ 1.0 mm)	7	7	7	4	1	1	0	0	0	2	5	7	41
Average relative humidity (%)	68.7	68.3	71.7	68.6	64.4	62.3	60.1	56.2	53.8	54.8	60.3	65.7	62.9
Mean monthly sunshine hours	237.8	210.0	214.6	245.1	271.4	261.3	293.5	305.6	298.5	288.9	251.1	226.5	3,104.3
Source: Instituto Nacional de Meteorologia

== See also ==
- List of municipalities in Bahia
