= Aiuaba Ecological Station =

Ecological station in Ceará, Brazil

- Estação Ecológica de Aiuaba
- IUCN category Ia (strict nature reserve)
- Location within Brazil
- Nearest city: Juazeiro do Norte, Ceará Brazil
- Coordinates: 6.6514°S 40.1804°W
- Area: 11,747 hectares (29,030 acres)
- Designation: Ecological station
- Created: 6 February 2001
- Administrator: ICMBio

Aiuaba Ecological Station (Portuguese: Estação Ecológica de Aiuaba) is an ecological station in the state of Ceará, Brazil. It preserves an area of Caatinga dry forest biome. The conservation unit is threatened from deforestation and hunting by the local people.

== Location ==
Aiuaba Ecological Station ESEC is in the Caatinga biome. It covers 11,747 hectares (29,030 acres). It was created by decree on 6 February 2001 and is administered by the Chico Mendes Institute for Biodiversity Conservation. The conservation unit is in the municipality of Aiuaba in the state of Ceará. It is in the mid-north sedimentary basin in the Serra de Ibiapaba. The area is hilly in some areas, flatter in others. It reaches altitudes of 400 to 700 metres (1,300 to 2,300 ft) above sea level.

Average annual rainfall is 590 to 684 millimetres (23.2 to 26.9 in), with most rain falling between December and June. The average temperature is 23 °C (73 °F). Vegetation is wooded or forested steppe savannah and has mostly not been altered by human action, apart from some fields. Many of the plants are adapted to drought. Bird life is limited due to the long dry periods.

== Conservation ==
Aiuaba Ecological Station is classed as IUCN protected area category Ia (strict nature reserve). The purpose is to conserve nature and support scientific research. The eared dove (Zenaida auriculata), which is threatened by professional hunters, seeks refuge in the unit during the breeding season. The unit is of great ecological importance as the largest Caatinga biome conservation area fully covered in Caatinga trees, and plays an important role in preserving biological diversity.

In 2014 an environmentalist stated that the Aiuaba Ecological Station had been delivered to its fate. There had been no manager since December 2012, which was causing irreparable damage to the region's wildlife and savannah biome. Hunters were on a spree, killing birds and wild animals, as well as felling centuries-old native trees." As of 2015 the Gameleira surveillance post had been closed for a year. The unit and its surroundings were threatened by local people who hunt and remove trees, although an environmental awareness program may be having some effect in reducing these activities.

== Sources ==
- Amauri Alencar (9 June 2015), "Estação Ecológica de Aiuaba festeja 37 anos de existência", Diario do Nordeste (in Portuguese)
- Esec de Aiuaba (in Portuguese), Chico Mendes Institute for Biodiversity Conservation
- "Estação Ecológica de Aiuaba", Ambiente Brasil (in Portuguese), 18 May 2010
- Silvânia Claudino (13 March 2014), "Estação Ecológica de Aiuaba sofre com ação de caçadores", Diário do Nordeste, archived from the original on 3 June 2016
- Unidade de Conservação: Estação Ecológica de Aiuaba (in Portuguese), MMA: Ministério do Meio Ambiente
