= Maurício Dantas Private Natural Heritage Ecological Reserve =

Nature reserve in Brazil

- Reserva Particulare do Patrimônio Natural Reserva Ecológica Maurício Dantas
- Location within Brazil
- Nearest city: Betânia, Pernambuco
- Coordinates: 8°18′40″S 38°11′42″W
- Area: 1,485 hectares (3,670 acres)
- Designation: Private natural heritage reserve
- Created: 12 September 1997
- Administrator: (Private) Chico Mendes Institute for Biodiversity Conservation

The Maurício Dantas Private Natural Heritage Ecological Reserve (Portuguese: Reserva Particulare do Patrimônio Natural Reserva Ecológica Maurício Dantas) is a private natural heritage reserve in the state of Pernambuco, Brazil. It protects an area of dry caatinga vegetation. It was created on 12 September 1997.

== Location ==
The Maurício Dantas Private Natural Heritage Ecological Reserve (RPPN) is divided between municipalities of Betânia and Floresta, Pernambuco, about 415 kilometres (258 mi) from the state capital, Recife. It is part of the 1,885 hectares (4,660 acres) Fazenda Rabeca, and occupies an area of 1,485 hectares (3,670 acres). Altitudes vary from 450 to 700 metres (1,480 to 2,300 ft). The property has been fenced to deter hunters, who killed a jaguar there in 1975 without the owner's permission. There are three families on the property practicing subsistence agriculture.

== History ==
The Maurício Dantas Private Natural Heritage Ecological Reserve was created by ordnance 104/97-N of 12 September 1997. It was the first caatinga RPPN in Pernambuco. The land is permanently protected, but the owners may use it for ecotourism, leisure, recreation and environmental education. It is under federal oversight. It became part of the Caatinga Ecological Corridor, created in 2006.

== Environment ==
The Köppen climate classification is BSh'w, with annual rainfall of 511 millimetres (20.1 in). 11 months of the year are dry. Average daily temperatures are 27 °C (81 °F). There was clear cutting 20 years before 2001. A study between 2001 and 2006 found that most species of plant had fairly stable populations, but some increased or decreased considerably, perhaps due to continued recovery from the clear cutting. There was a 13.5% increase in total number of plants, and increases in average diameter and above ground biomass. Fauna include tamandua, seriema, rock cavy, guan, collared peccary, fox and possibly jaguar.

== Sources ==
- Cavalcanti, Airton de Deus Cysneiros; Rodal, Maria Jesus Nogueira; Sampaio, Everardo Valadares de Sá Barreto; Costa, Keila Cristina Carvalho (12 March 2009), "Mudanças florísticas e estruturais, após cinco anos, em uma comunidade de Caatinga no estado de Pernambuco, Brasil" (PDF), Nota Científica
- Falcão, Verônica (6 June 1998), "Família transforma fazenda em reserva", Jornal do Commercio (in Portuguese), Recife
- Ganem, Roseli Senna (2016), "Gestão integrada da biodiversidade: corredores, mosaicos e reservas da biosfera" (PDF), Conservação da Biodiversidade Legislação e Políticas Públicas (in Portuguese), archived from the original (PDF) on 2016-11-04
- Pessoa, Luciana Maranhao; Rodal, Maria Jesus Nogueira; Lins e Silva, Ana Carolina Borges; Costa, Keila Cristina Carvalho (2004), "Levantamento da Flora Herbacea em um Trecho de Caatinga, RPPN Maurício Dantas, Betânia/Floresta, Pernambuco", Revista Nordestina de Biologia, 18 (1), ISSN 0100-7653
- RPPN do Estado do Pernambuco (in Portuguese), rppnweb
- RPPN Reserva Ecológica Maurício Dantas (in Portuguese), ICMBio: Chico Mendes Institute for Biodiversity Conservation
