= Tabocas do Brejo Velho =

Coordinates: 12°42′21″S 44°00′25″W

- Municipality
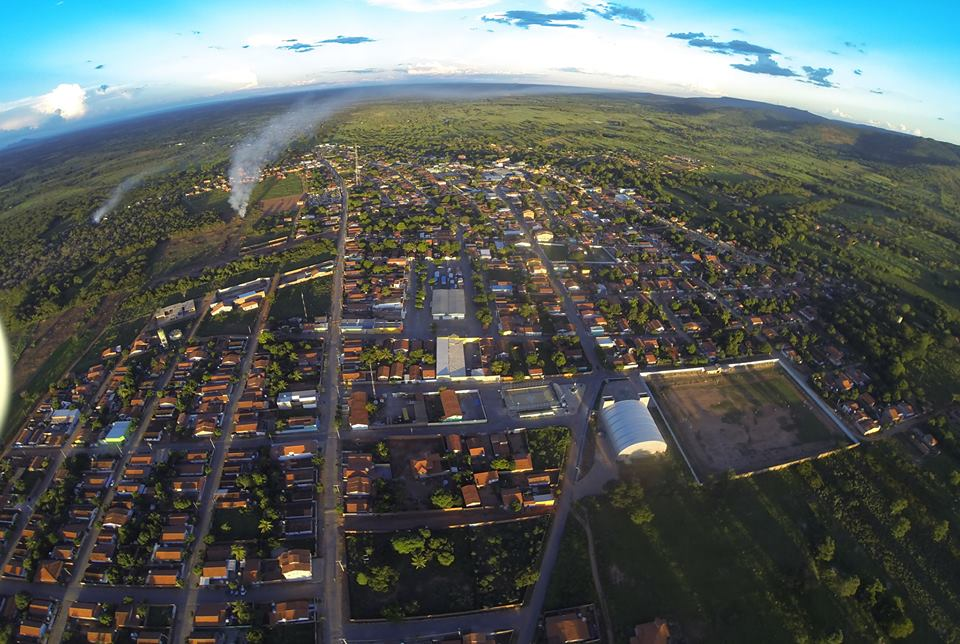
- Aerial view of Tabocas do Brejo Velho

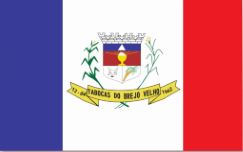
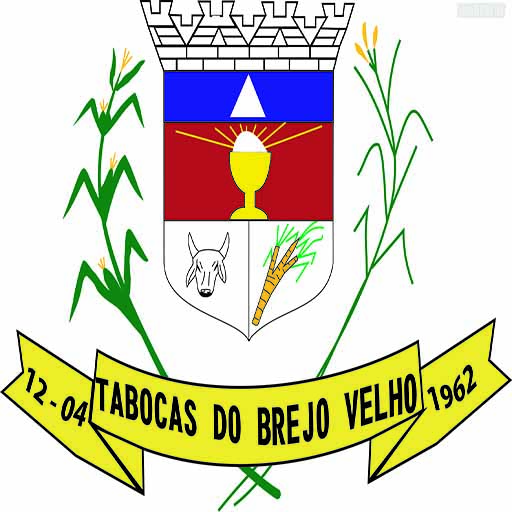
- Flag Coat of arms
- Interactive map of Tabocas do Brejo Velho
- Country: Brazil
- Region: Nordeste
- State: Bahia

Population (2020)
  - Total: 12,516
- Time zone: UTC−3 (BRT)

Tabocas do Brejo Velho is a municipality in the state of Bahia in the North-East region of Brazil.

== See also ==
- List of municipalities in Bahia
