= Monte Alegre do Piauí =

Coordinates: 9°44′S 45°17′W

- Municipality
- Country: Brazil
- Region: Nordeste
- State: Piauí
- Mesoregion: Sudoeste Piauiense

Population (2020)
  - Total: 10,615
- Time zone: UTC−3 (BRT)

Monte Alegre do Piauí is a municipality in the state of Piauí in the Northeast region of Brazil.

The municipality was designated a priority area for conservation and sustainable use when the Caatinga Ecological Corridor was created in 2006.

== See also ==
- List of municipalities in Piauí
