= Inajá, Paraná =

Coordinates: 22°44′56″S 52°11′52″W

Inajá
- Municipality
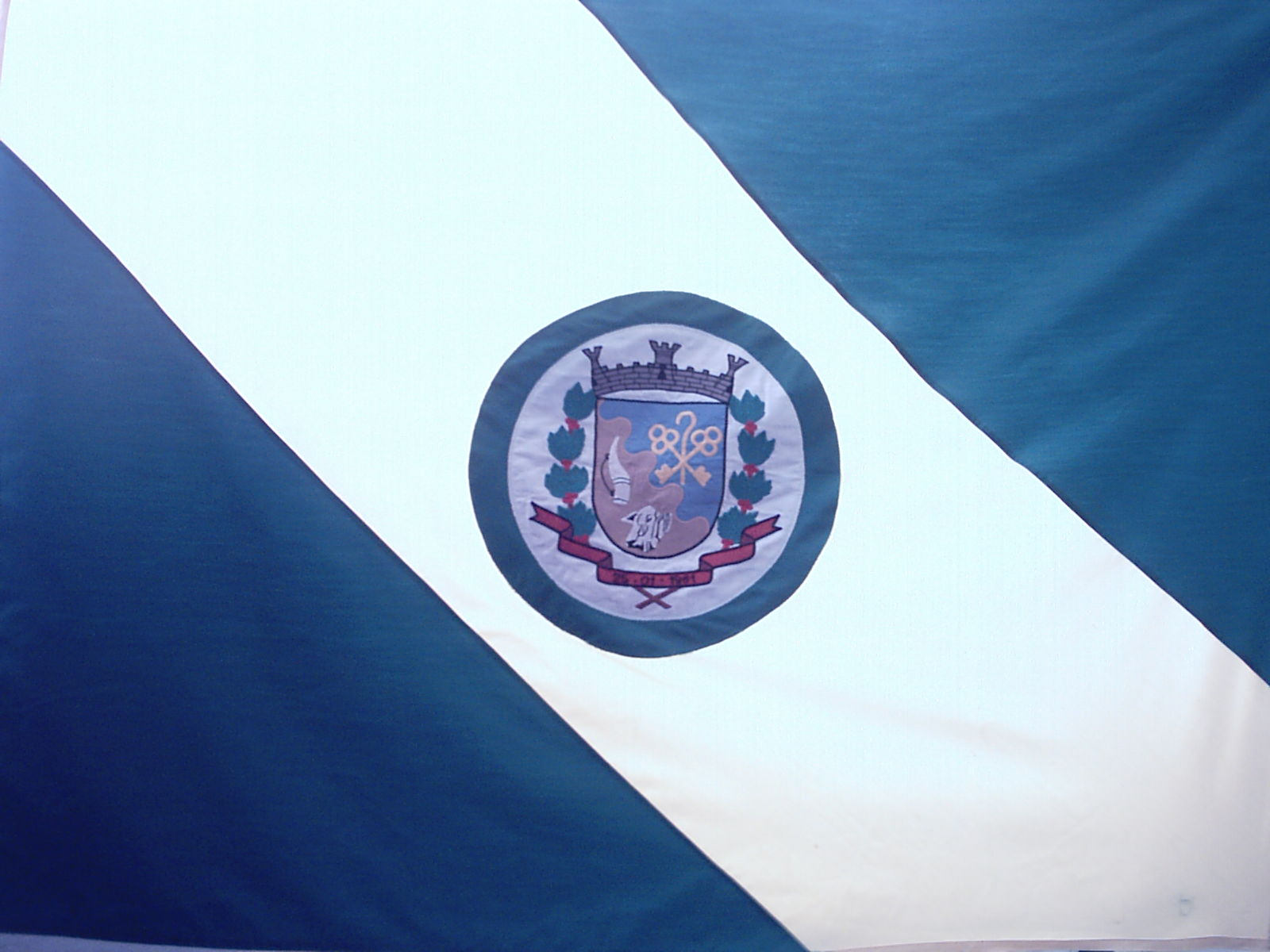
- Flag
- Interactive map of Inajá
- Country: Brazil
- Region: Southern
- State: Paraná
- Mesoregion: Noroeste Paraná

Population (2020)
  - Total: 3,116
- Time zone: UTC−3 (BRT)

Inajá is a municipality in the state of Paraná in the South Region of Brazil.

== See also ==
- List of municipalities in Paraná
