= Serra Negra Biological Reserve =

Biological reserve in Pernambuco, Brazil

- Reserva Biológica de Serra Negra
- IUCN category Ia (strict nature reserve)
- Location within Brazil
- Nearest city: Petrolândia, Pernambuco
- Coordinates: 8°39′18″S 38°01′44″W
- Area: 624 hectares (1,540 acres)
- Designation: Biological reserve
- Created: 20 September 1982

Serra Negra Biological Reserve (Portuguese: Reserva Biológica de Serra Negra) is a Biological reserve in the state of Pernambuco, Brazil.

== History ==
The reserve of 624 hectares (1,540 acres) was created on 20 September 1982. The area at time of creation was 1,100 hectares (2,700 acres). It became part of the Caatinga Ecological Corridor, created in May 2006.

The reserve is in parts of the municipalities of Floresta, Inajá and Tacaratu in Pernambuco. It is administered by the Chico Mendes Institute for Biodiversity Conservation. Today, the purpose of the reserve is to fully preserve the biota without direct human interference other than actions to restore and preserve the natural balance, biological diversity and natural ecological processes.

== Ecosystem ==
The Biological Reserve is classed as a "strict nature reserve" under IUCN protected area category Ia.

The climate of the surrounding area is dry and tropical with an annual average rainfall of 300 to 500 millimetres (12 to 20 in) and average temperature of 22 to 38 °C (72 to 100 °F).

The reserve occupies the summit of an inselberg, or isolated elevation, and is an island of tropical rainforest in the Caatinga area.

Tree species include Libidibia ferrea, Copaifera trapezifolia and Tabebuia. The grey-breasted parakeet (Pyrrhura griseipectus) is a protected species in the reserve.

== Sources ==
- Ganem, Roseli Senna (2016), "Gestão integrada da biodiversidade: corredores, mosaicos e reservas da biosfera" (PDF), Conservação da Biodiversidade Legislação e Políticas Públicas (in Portuguese), archived from the original (PDF) on 2016-11-04
- Reserva Biológica de Serra Negra (in Portuguese), Chico Mendes Institute for Biodiversity Conservation
- "Reserva Biológica da Serra Negra", ViaRural, archived from the original on June 10, 2009
- Triana, Elisa (29 May 2009), "Strict Nature Reserves in Brazil", The Encyclopedia of Earth
- Unidade de Conservação: Reserva Biológica de Serra Negra (in Portuguese), MMA: Ministério do Meio Ambiente
