= Tacaratu =

Municipality in Pernambuco, Brazil

- Municipality of Pernambuco, Brazil
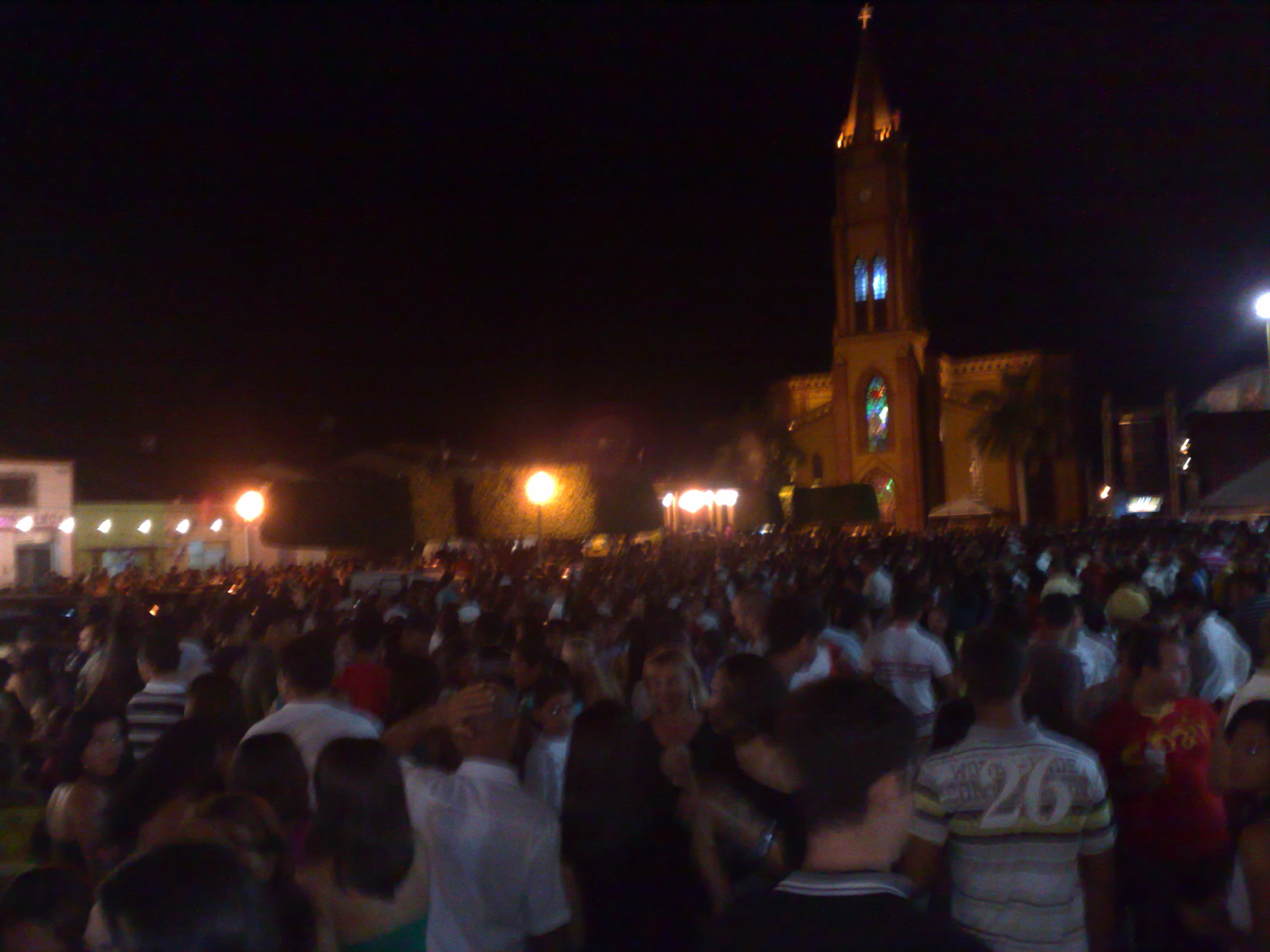
- Sanctuary of Our Lady of Health church in Tacaratu

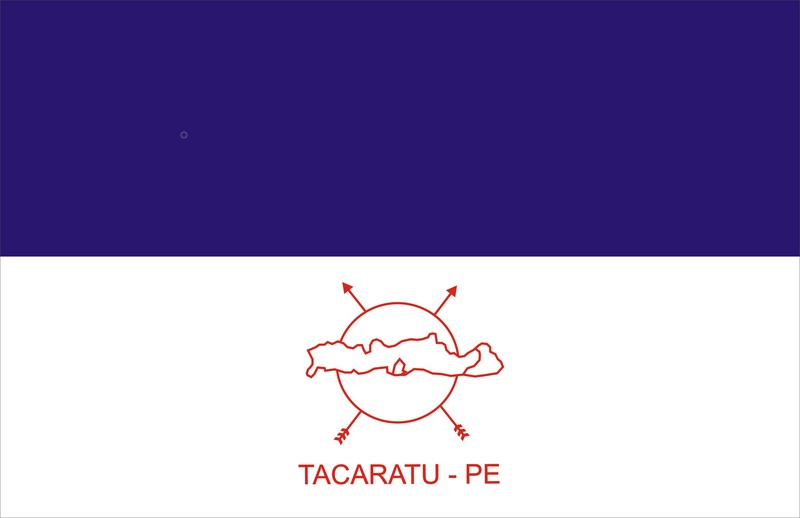
- Flag
- Etymology: Derived from the indigenous language, meaning "land of many points or heads"
- Location of Tacaratu in Pernambuco

- Location within Brazil Location within South America
- Coordinates: 9°6′9″S 38°8′57″W
- Country: Brazil
- Region: Northeast
- State: Pernambuco
- Founded: 13 May 1954

Government
  - Mayor: Washington Angelo de Araújo (MDB) (2025-2028)
  - Vice Mayor: Givaldo Torres de Oliveira (REDE) (2025-2028)

Area
  - Total: 1,264.532 km^{2} (488.239 sq mi)
- Elevation: 514 m (1,686 ft)

Population (2022 Census)
  - Total: 23,902
  - Estimate (2025): 24,898
  - Density: 18.9/km^{2} (49/sq mi)
- Demonym: Tacaratuense (Brazilian Portuguese)
- Time zone: UTC-03:00 (Brasília Time)
- Postal code: 56480-000, 56485-000
- HDI (2010): 0.573 – medium
- Website: tacaratu.pe.gov.br

Tacaratu (Central northeastern portuguese pronunciation: [tɐkɐɾɐˈtu]) is a municipality in the state of Pernambuco, Brazil. The population in 2025, according with IBGE is 24,898 and the area is 1264.5 km^{2}.

== Demographics ==
The indigenous Pankararú people live in Brejo dos Padres and other villages of Tacaratu.

== Geography ==
- State - Pernambuco
- Region - São Francisco Pernambucano
- Boundaries - Floresta (N); Jatobá and Alagoas state (S); Inajá and Alagoas (E); Petrolândia (W)
- Area - 1264.5 km^{2}
- Elevation - 14 m
- Hydrography - Moxotó river
- Vegetation - Caatinga hiperxerófila.
- Climate - Semi arid ( Sertão) hot and dry
- Annual average temperature - 24.1 c
- Distance to Recife - 458 km

The municipality contains part of the 625 hectares (1,540 acres) Serra Negra Biological Reserve, a strictly protected conservation unit created in 1982.

== Economy ==
The main economic activities in Tacaratu are based in general industry, commerce and agribusiness, especially creation of cattle, goats and sheep; and plantations of mangoes and beans.

=== Economic Indicators ===
Population	GDP x(1000 R$).	GDP pc (R$)	PE
22.231	52.359	2.548	0.087%

Economy by Sector 2006

Primary sector	Secondary sector	Service sector
11.48%	8.19%	80.33%

=== Health Indicators ===
HDI (2000)	Hospitals (2007)	Hospitals beds (2007)	Children's Mortality every 1000 (2005)
0.585	1	17	37

== See also ==
- List of municipalities in Pernambuco
