= Wanderley, Bahia =

Coordinates: 12°07′12″S 43°53′16″W

Wanderley
- Municipality
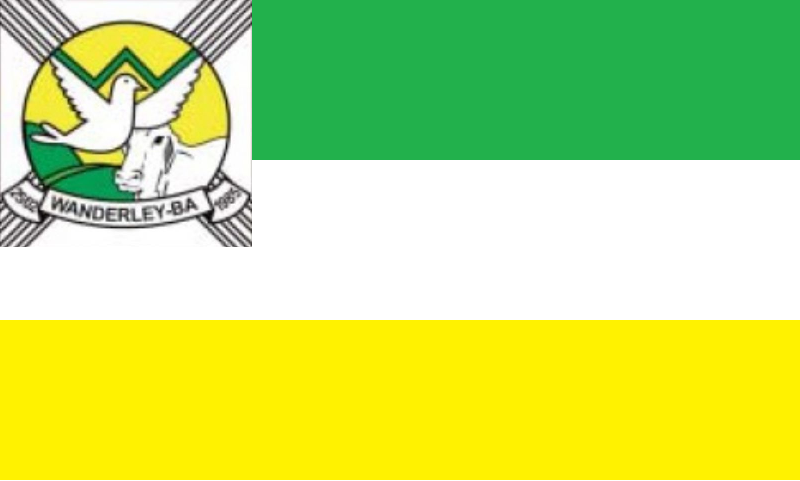
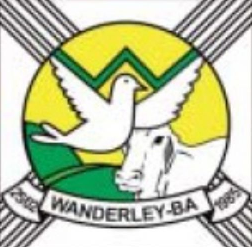
- Flag Coat of arms
- Interactive map of Wanderley
- Country: Brazil
- Region: Nordeste
- State: Bahia

Population (2020)
  - Total: 12,180
- Time zone: UTC−3 (BRT)

Wanderley is a municipality in the state of Bahia in the North-East region of Brazil. It has a population of roughly 12,000 people. It is very dependent on the agricultural industry in the region with a large portion of the people owning cattle. In the centre of the city there is a church, a market, and an abandoned gas station. It is approximately two hours from the main city in the region, Barreiras, and eleven hours driving from the capital of the state Bahia, Salvador. It is nine hours from the Brazilian capital.

== See also ==
- List of municipalities in Bahia
