= Angical =

Municipality of Bahia, Brazil

- Municipality
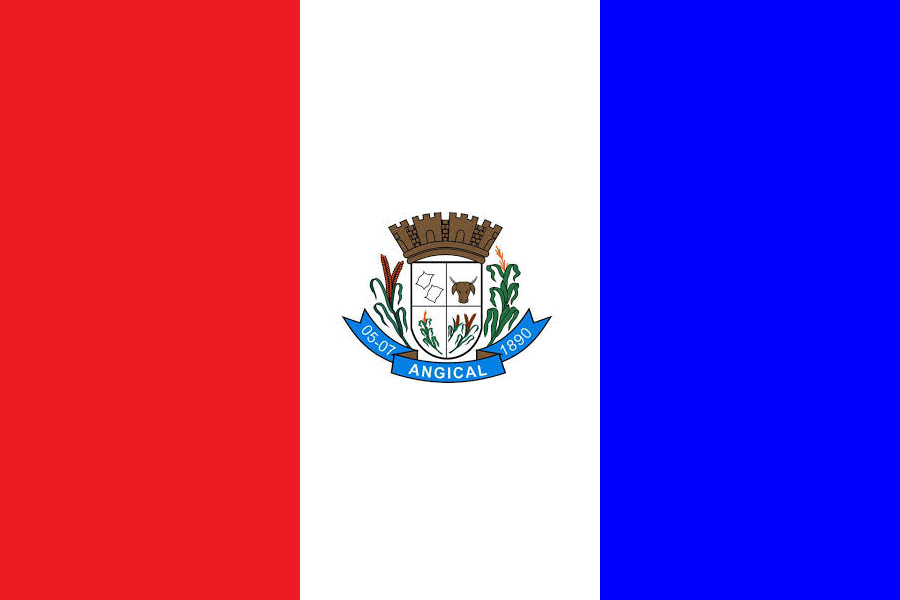
- Flag

- Location in Brazil
- Coordinates: 12°00′25″S 44°41′38″W
- Country: Brazil
- Region: Nordeste
- State: Bahia

Population (2020)
  - Total: 13,938
- Time zone: UTC−3 (BRT)

Angical is a municipality in the state of Bahia in the North-East region of Brazil.

The municipality was designated a priority area for conservation and sustainable use when the Caatinga Ecological Corridor was created in 2006.

== See also ==
- List of municipalities in Bahia
