= Mansidão =

Municipality of Bahia, Brazil

Coordinates: 10°43′S 44°02′W

Mansidão, Bahia
- Municipality
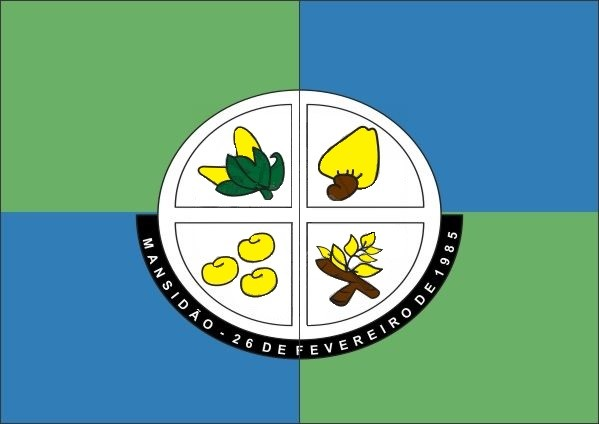
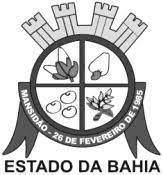
- Flag Coat of arms
- Interactive map of Mansidão, Bahia
- Country: Brazil
- Region: Nordeste
- State: Bahia

Population (2020)
  - Total: 13,734
- Time zone: UTC−3 (BRT)

Mansidão is a municipality in the state of Bahia in the North-East region of Brazil.

== See also ==
- List of municipalities in Bahia
