= Moxotó River =

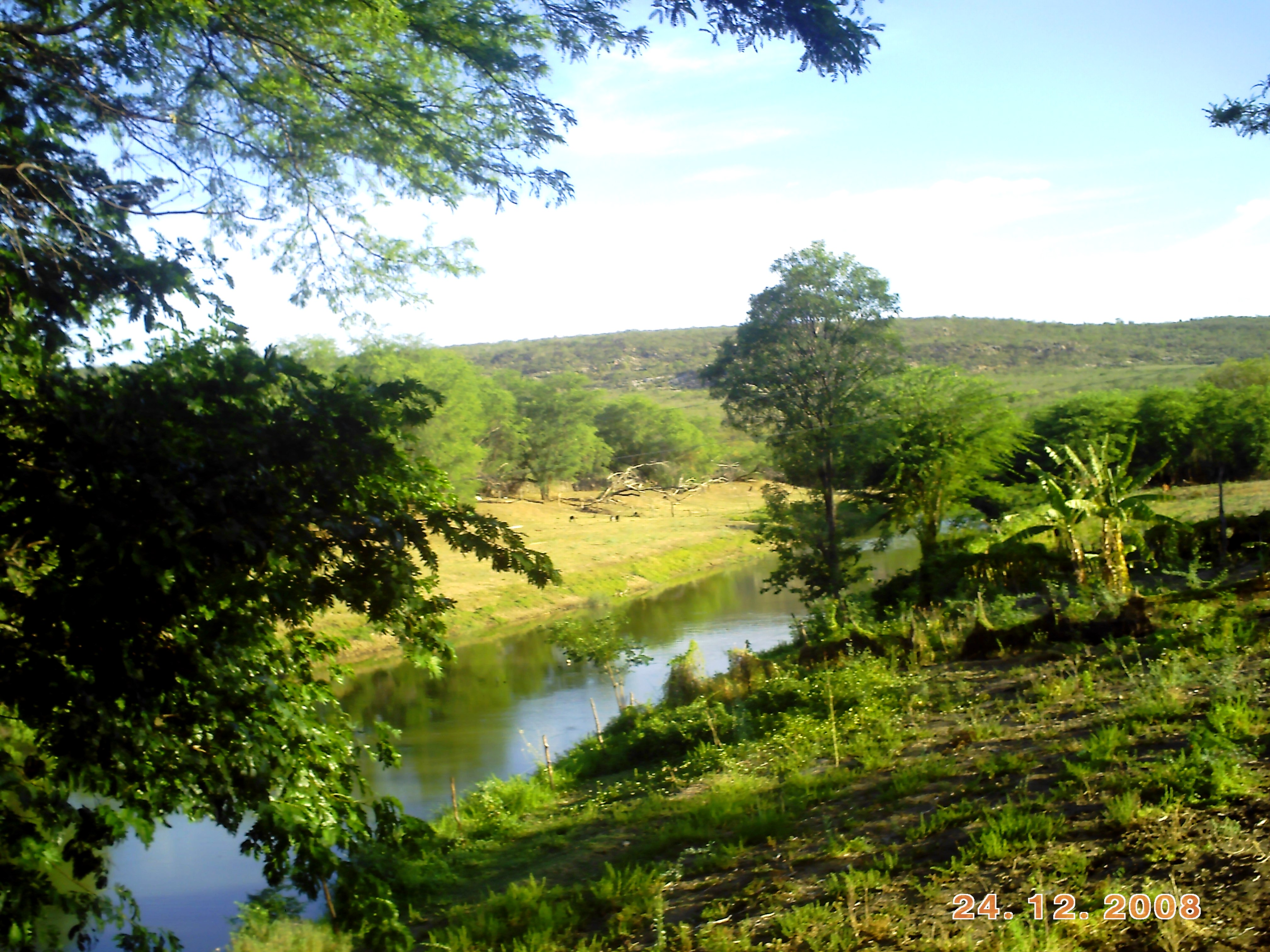
- near Inajá, Pernambuco

Location
- Country: Brazil

Physical characteristics
- Source
  - location: Alagoas state
- Mouth: São Francisco River
  - coordinates: 9°20′S 38°14′W

The Moxotó River is a tributary of the São Francisco River in northeastern Brazil. The Moxotó originates on the Borborema Plateau in Pernambuco state, and flows southwest to join the São Francisco. The lower portion of the river forms the border between Pernambuco state to the west and Alagoas state to the east.

== See also ==
- List of rivers of Alagoas
- List of rivers of Pernambuco
