= Garanhuns =

Municipality of Pernambuco, Brazil

- Municipality
- Municipality of Garanhuns
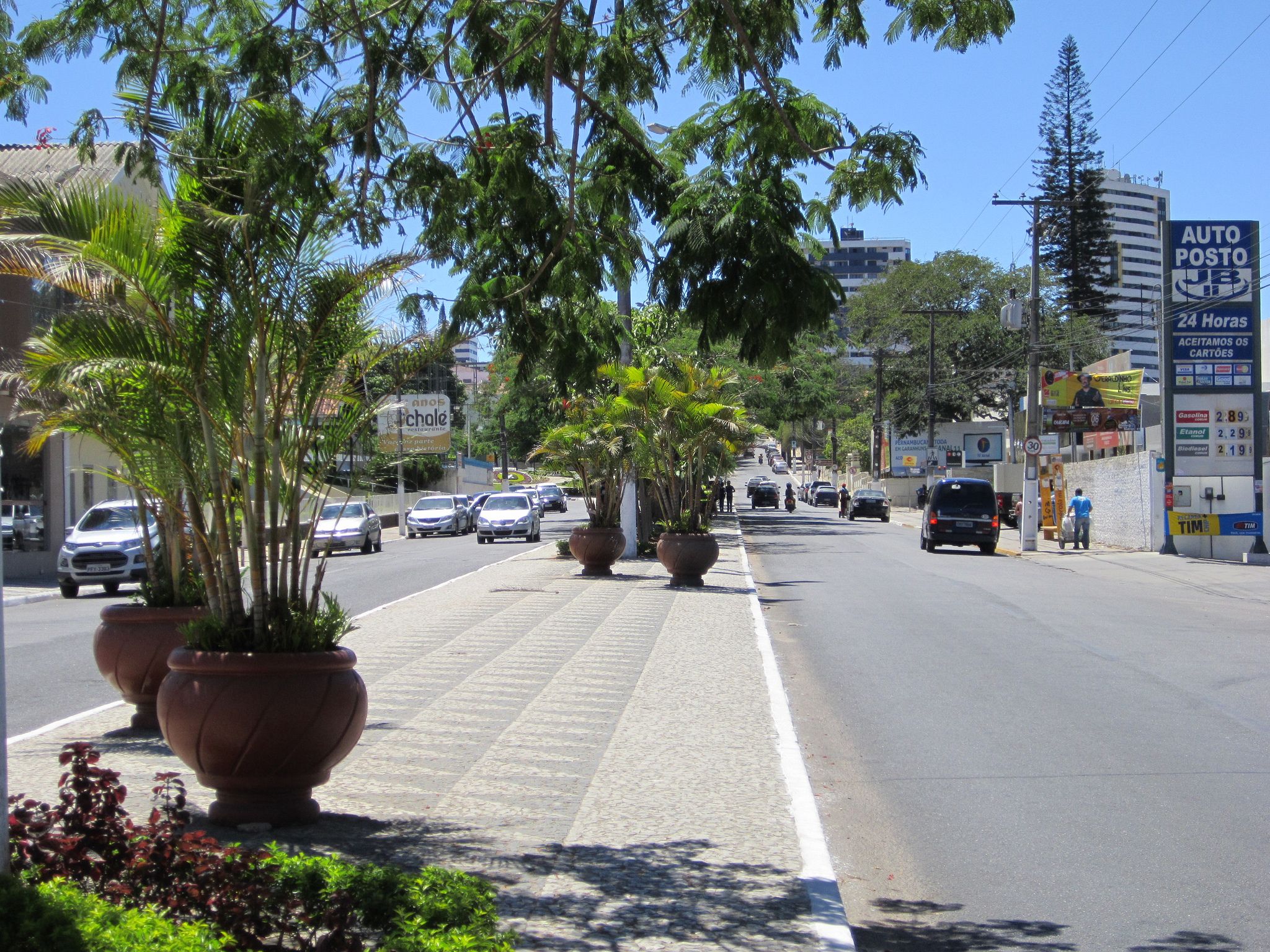
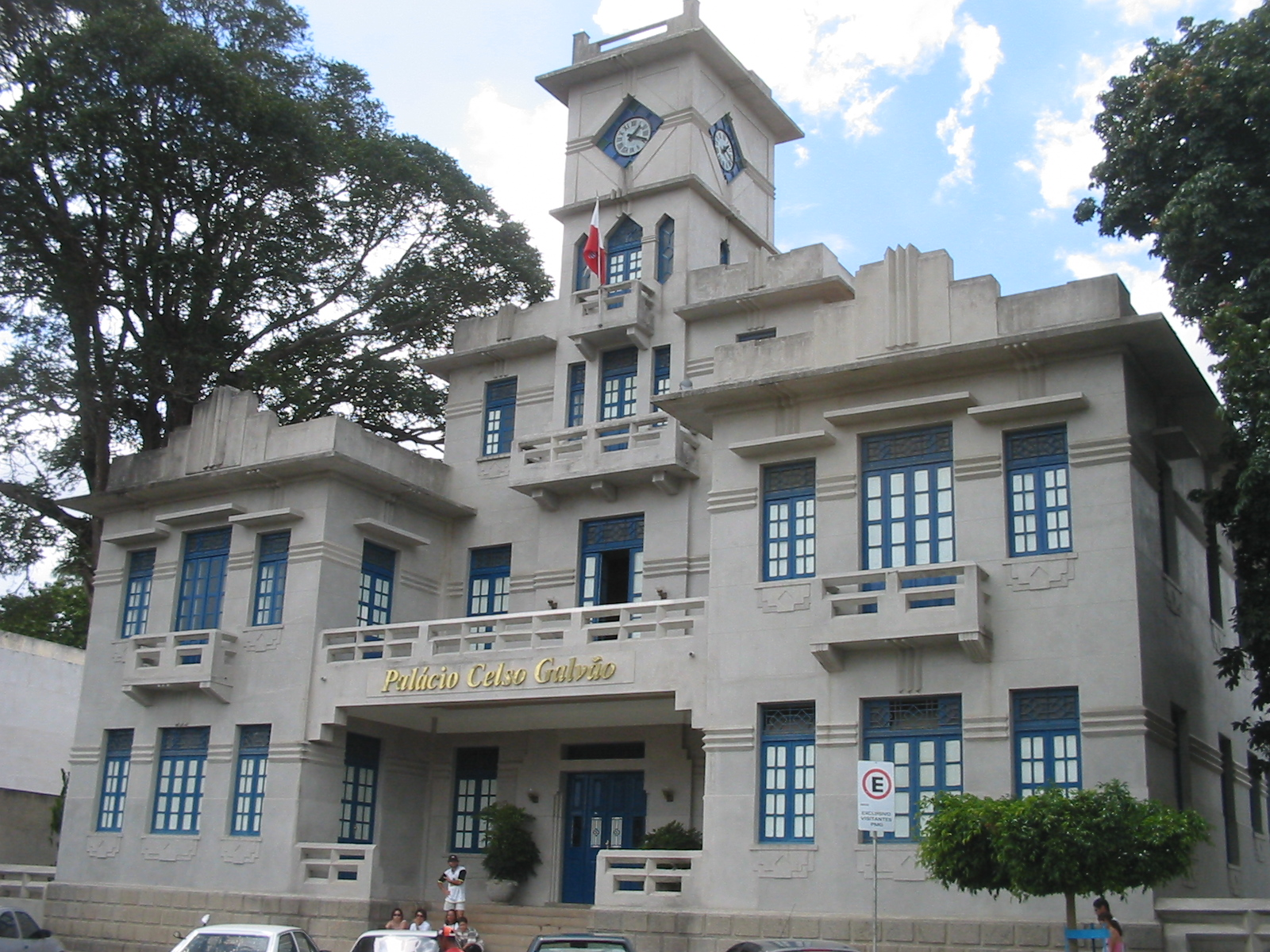
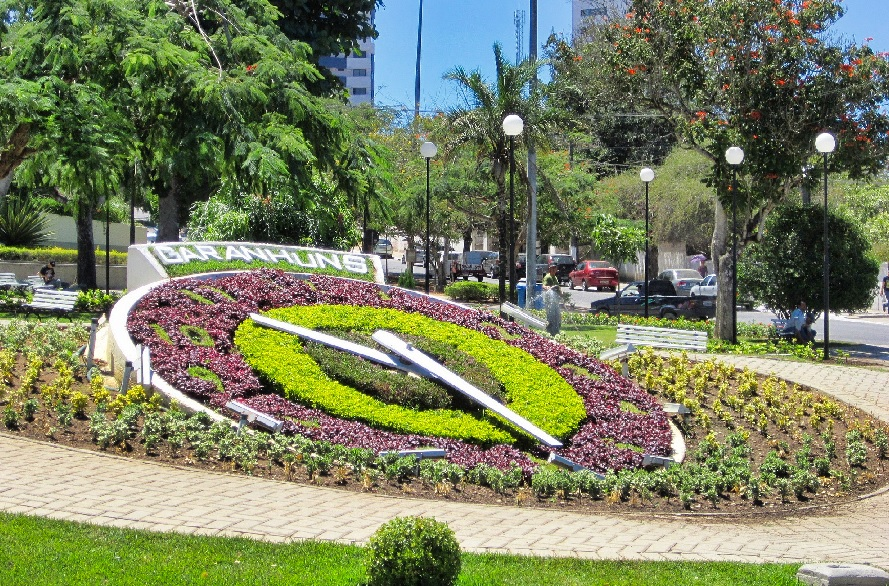
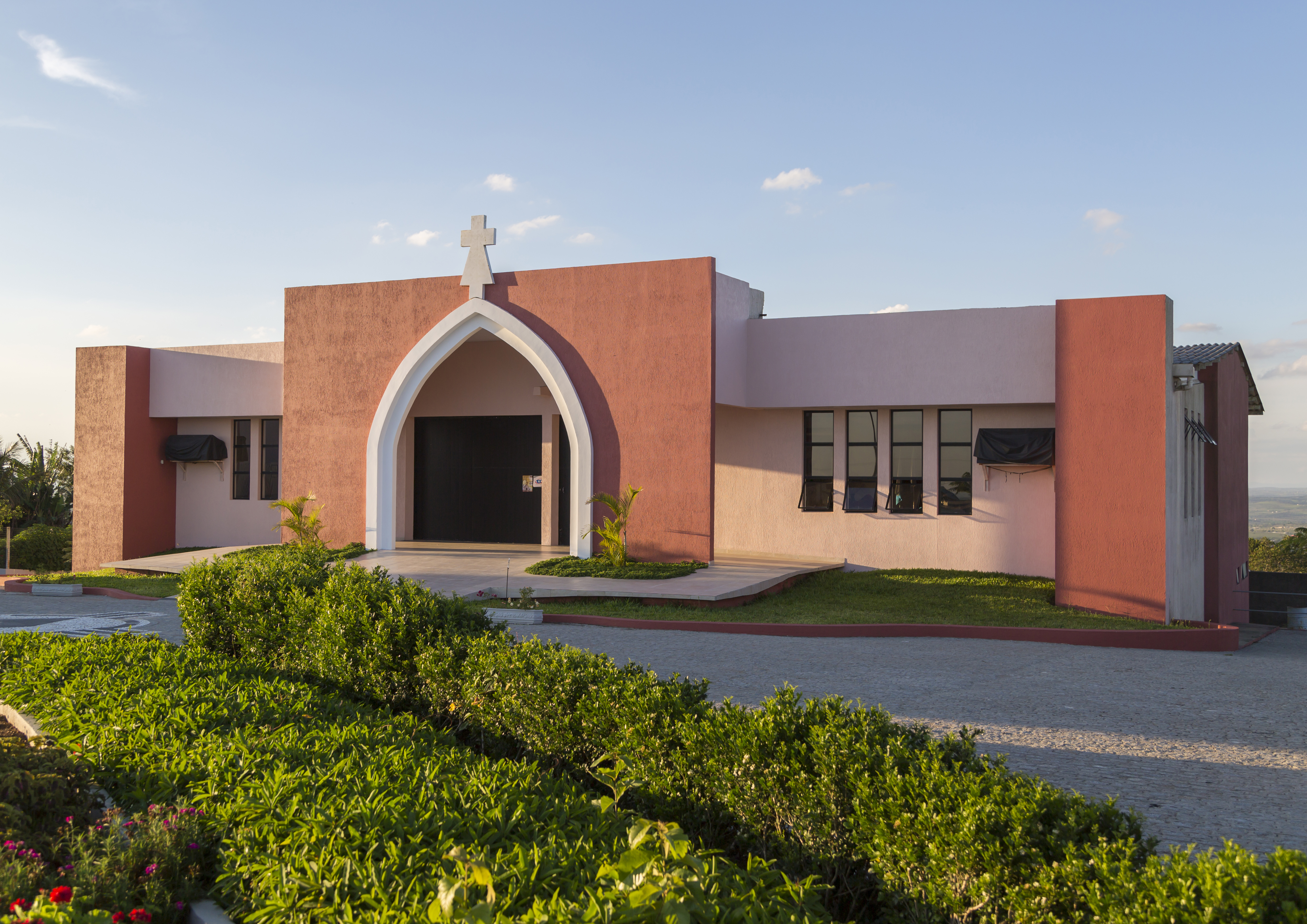
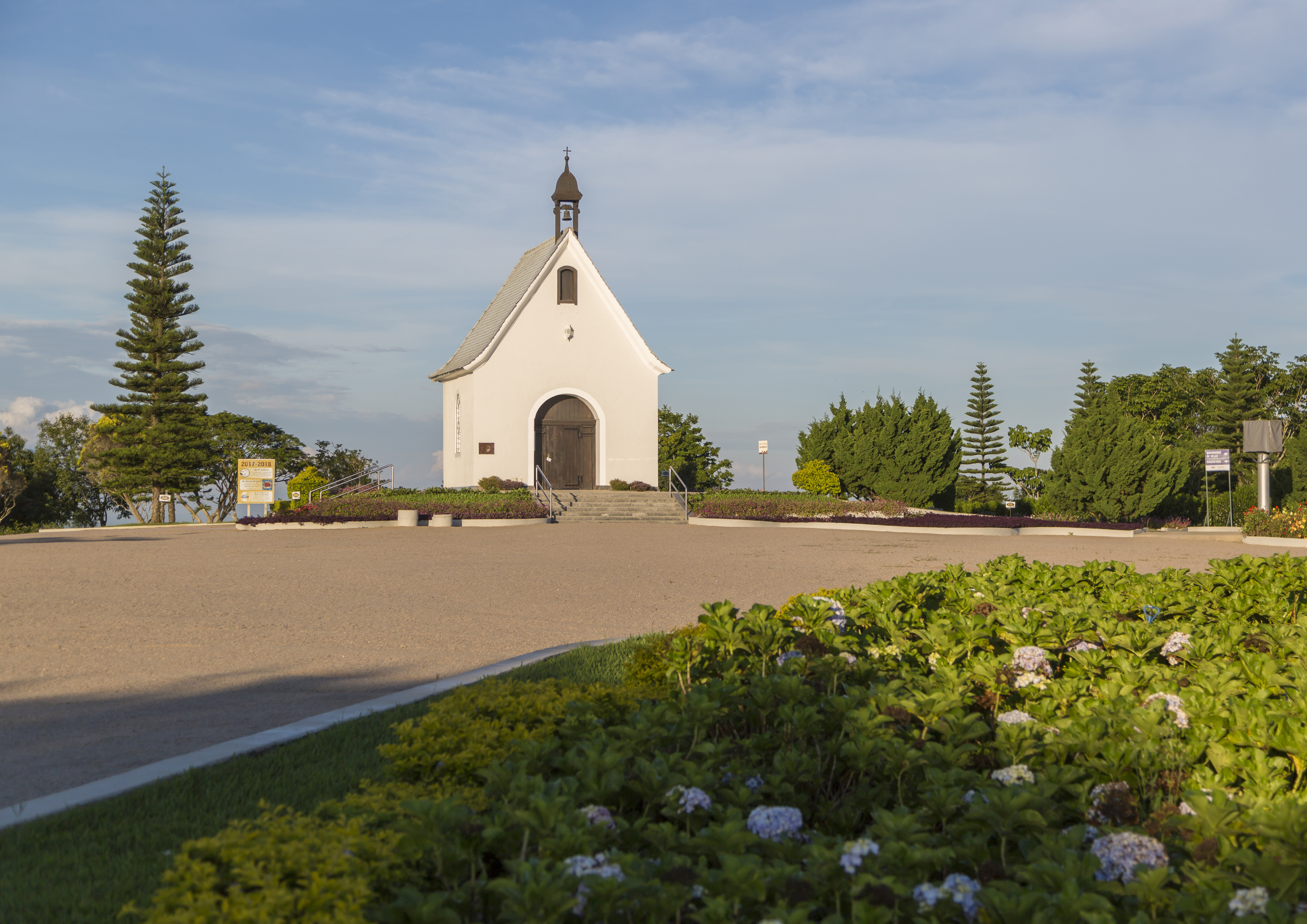
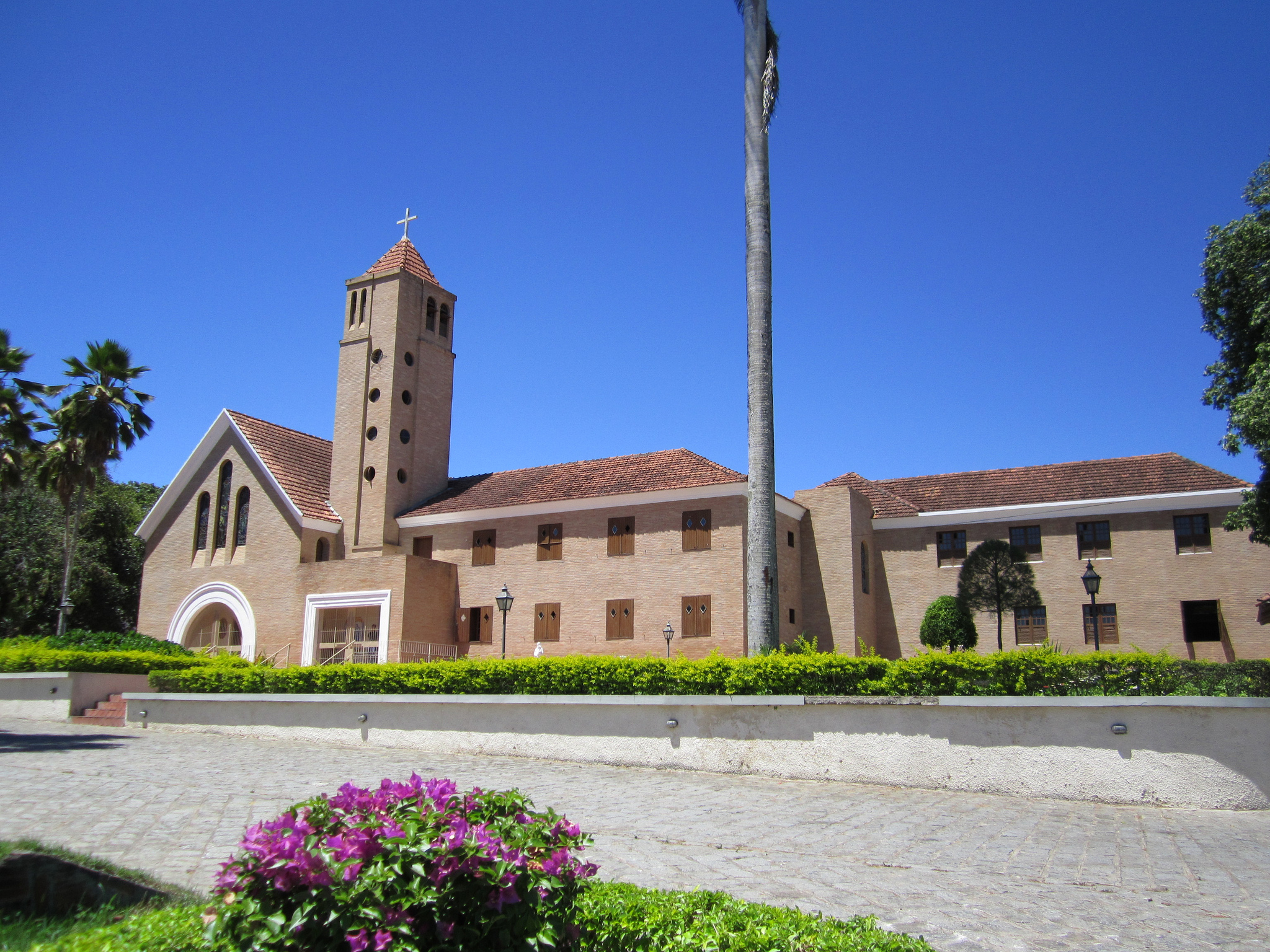
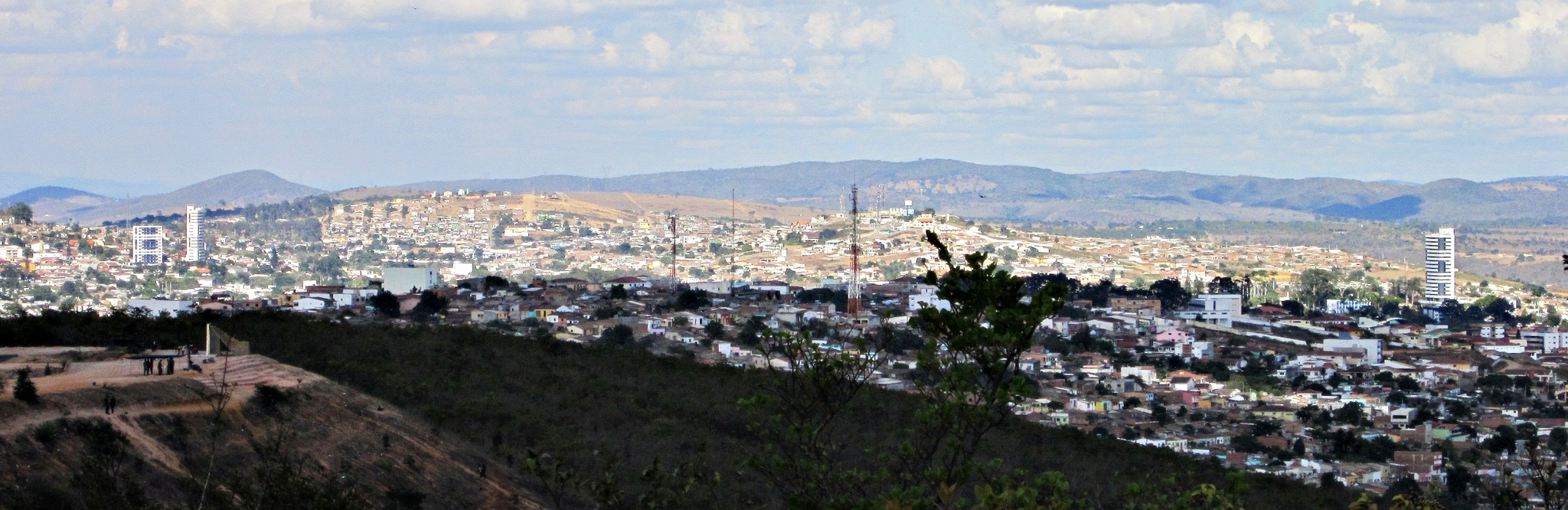

- Flag Coat of arms
- Motto(s): Ad altiora tendere "Striving to be greater"
- Location in Pernambuco

- Location within Brazil
- Coordinates: 08°53′25″S 36°29′34″W
- Country: Brazil
- Region: Northeast
- State: Pernambuco
- Metropolitan region: Caruaru
- Neighboring municipalities: North: Jucati, Capoeiras, and Caetés; South: Brejão, Terezinha, and Correntes; East: São João and Palmeirina; West: Saloá and Paranatama
- Distance to capital: 230 km
- Districts: Garanhuns, São Pedro, Miracica, and Iratama
- Established: 10 March 1811

Government
  - Mayor: Sivaldo Rodrigues Albino (PSB)

Area
  - Municipality: 458.552 km^{2} (177.048 sq mi)
  - Urban (IBGE/2019): 23.41 km^{2} (9.04 sq mi)
- Elevation: 896 m (2,940 ft)

Population (2022 census)
  - Municipality: 142,506
  - Estimate (2025): 151,803
  - Rank: (PE: 9th) · (NE: 45th) · (BR: 210th)
  - Density: 310.774/km^{2} (804.901/sq mi)
- Demonym: garanhuense
- Time zone: UTC−3 (BRT)
- Climate: Tropical savanna climate
- Climate classification: As
- HDI (UNDP/2010): 0.664
- HDI rank: PE: 16th
- GDP (IBGE/2018): 2,441,308 thousand BRL
- GDP rank: PE: 12th/BR: 385th
- GDP per capita (IBGE/2018): 17565.52 BRL
- Website: www.garanhuns.pe.gov.br

Garanhuns (Brazilian Portuguese pronunciation: [garɐˈɲus]) is a Brazilian municipality in the Agreste region of the state of Pernambuco, located 230 kilometers from the state capital, Recife. It covers an area of 458.552 km² and belongs to the Caruaru Intermediate Geographic Region, serving as the principal and most populous municipality in the Garanhuns Immediate Geographic Region. According to the Brazilian Institute of Geography and Statistics (IBGE) in 2022 Census, Garanhuns had an estimated population of approximately 142,506 inhabitants, making it the ninth most populous municipality in Pernambuco, the third most populous in the state's interior, and the second most populous in the Pernambucan Agreste region.

Originally, the lands of Garanhuns were inhabited by the indigenous Cariri people. During the 17h century, white colonists and enslaved Africans escaping Dutch domination in Dutch Brazil established communities in the region's Caatinga moist-forest enclaves, establishing scattered villages. On 29 September 1658, Mestre de campo Nicolau Aranha Pacheco, Captain Cosmo de Brito Cação, Antonio Fernandes Aranha, and Ambrósio Aranha de Farias received a land grant of approximately 20 leagues from the acting governor, André Vidal de Negreiros. This grant included two plots: one in the fields of Garanhuns and another in Panema. That same year, the Garcia Farm was established in the area now encompassing the municipal seat.

Garanhuns is a hub in the southern Agreste, serving as a center for 32 municipalities and supporting a surrounding population of over one million people. It is a regional leader in healthcare and education services. The municipality's commerce and service offerings make tourism a driver of employment, income, and development, supported by a robust network of service providers and hotels. Each July, Garanhuns hosts the Garanhuns Winter Festival, attracting thousands of tourists from around the world.

== Etymology ==
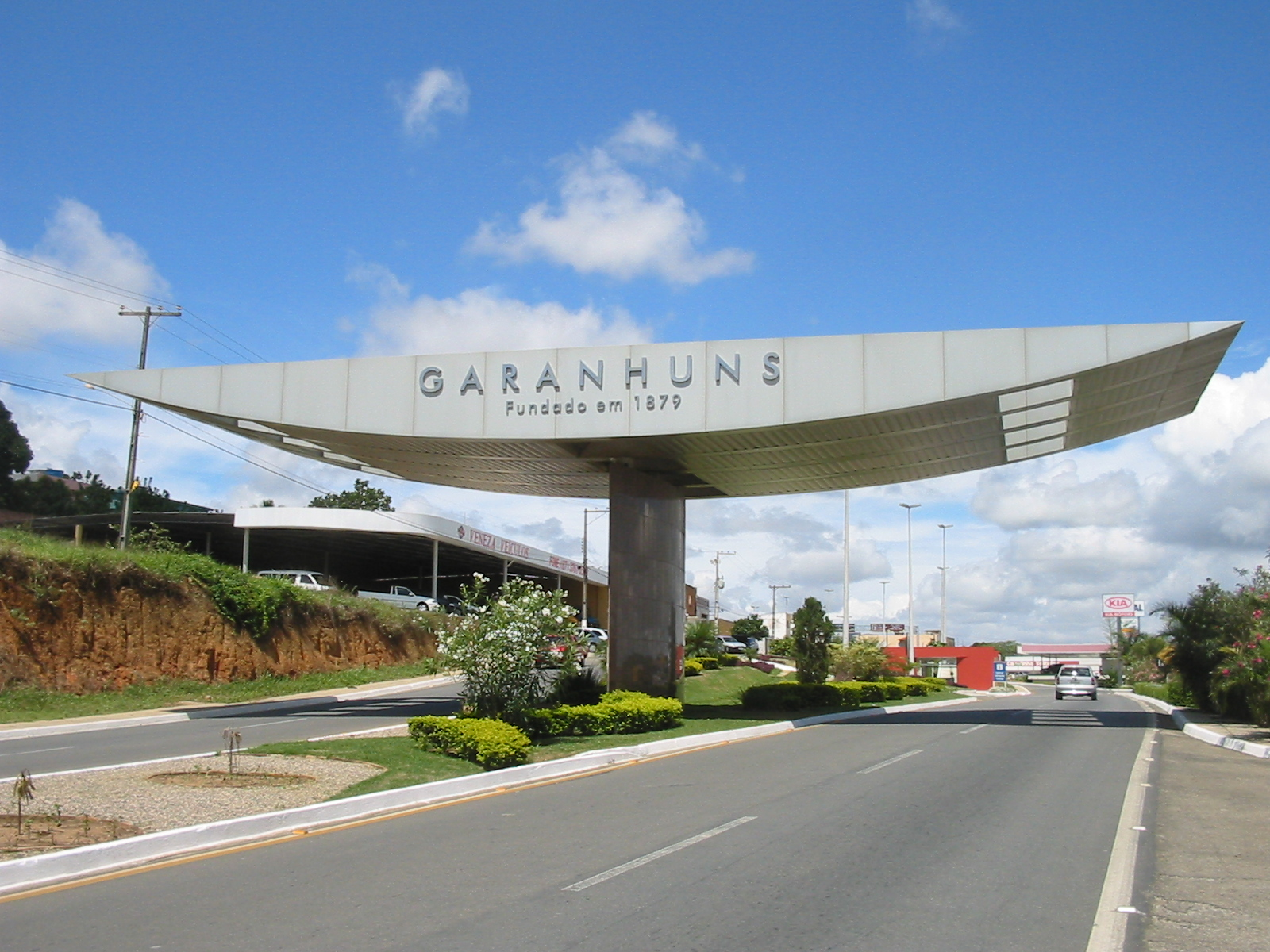
Portico at the entrance to Garanhuns

The origin of the toponym Garanhuns is highly debated, with multiple interpretations. Lexicographer José de Almeida Maciel, in his book "Issues of Municipal Toponymy," suggests the name derives from guirá-nhum, meaning "black birds," referring to an indigenous group in the area. According to Professor João de Deus Oliveira Dias (cited in the Brazilian Territorial Documentation by the Brazilian Institute of Geography and Statistics), the term comes from the Cairu people, a branch of the Cariri or Quiriri, derived from Guiranhu or Unhannhum, combining guirá or guará (a red-legged aquatic bird) and anhu or anhum (anum, a black bird), species that inhabited the valley of the Mundaú River near its source, where the original village was located. Conversely, lexicographer Sebastião de Vasconcelos Galvão, in his "Chorographic, Historical, and Statistical Dictionary of Pernambuco," posits that the name is of indigenous origin, meaning "site of guarás and anuns" (guarás being a species of wild dog and anuns a bird considered an ill omen).

Writer Ademilson Antônio Macedo, in his "Dictionary of Names, Origins, and Meanings of Brazilian Municipalities," translates the name as "man of the field." According to writer Mário Melo, the toponym is a corruption of guirá-nhum, evolving into guará-nhum, meaning "black individual," referring to the quilombo in the mountains. He notes, "... even today, the Carijó Indians of Águas Belas know Garanhuns as claiô in their Yatê language: claí (white), iô (not): not white, dark, black. It should also be noted that the Garanhuns mountain range was named after the Garanhuns tribe, which was of Cariri origin and inhabited the area."

Tupinologist Eduardo Navarro asserts in his Dictionary of Old Tupi (2013) that the toponym originates from Old Tupi, combining agûará + nhũ, meaning "grassland (nhũ) of maned wolves (agûará)".

== History ==
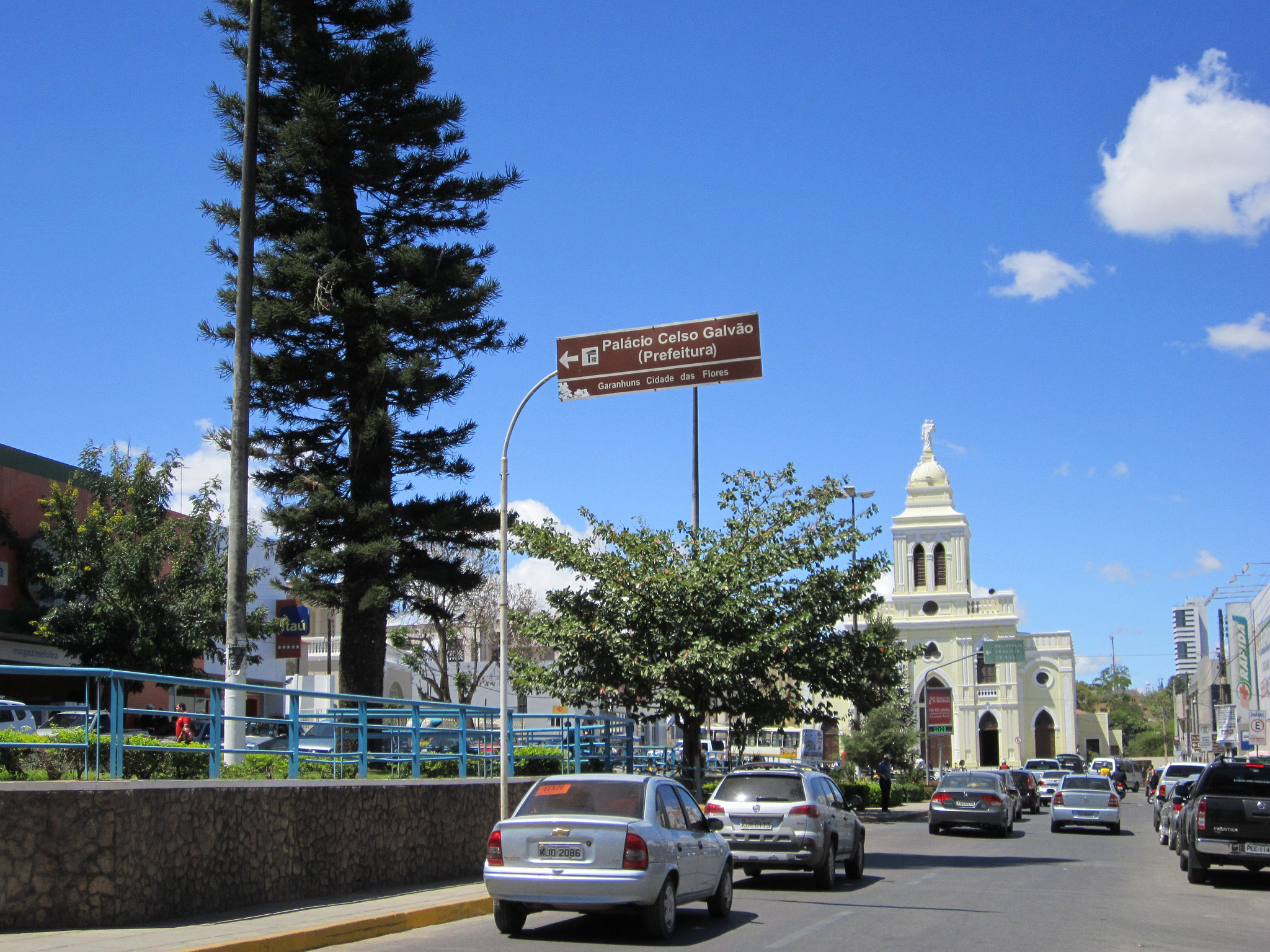
Saint Anthony Cathedral, in the center of Garanhuns

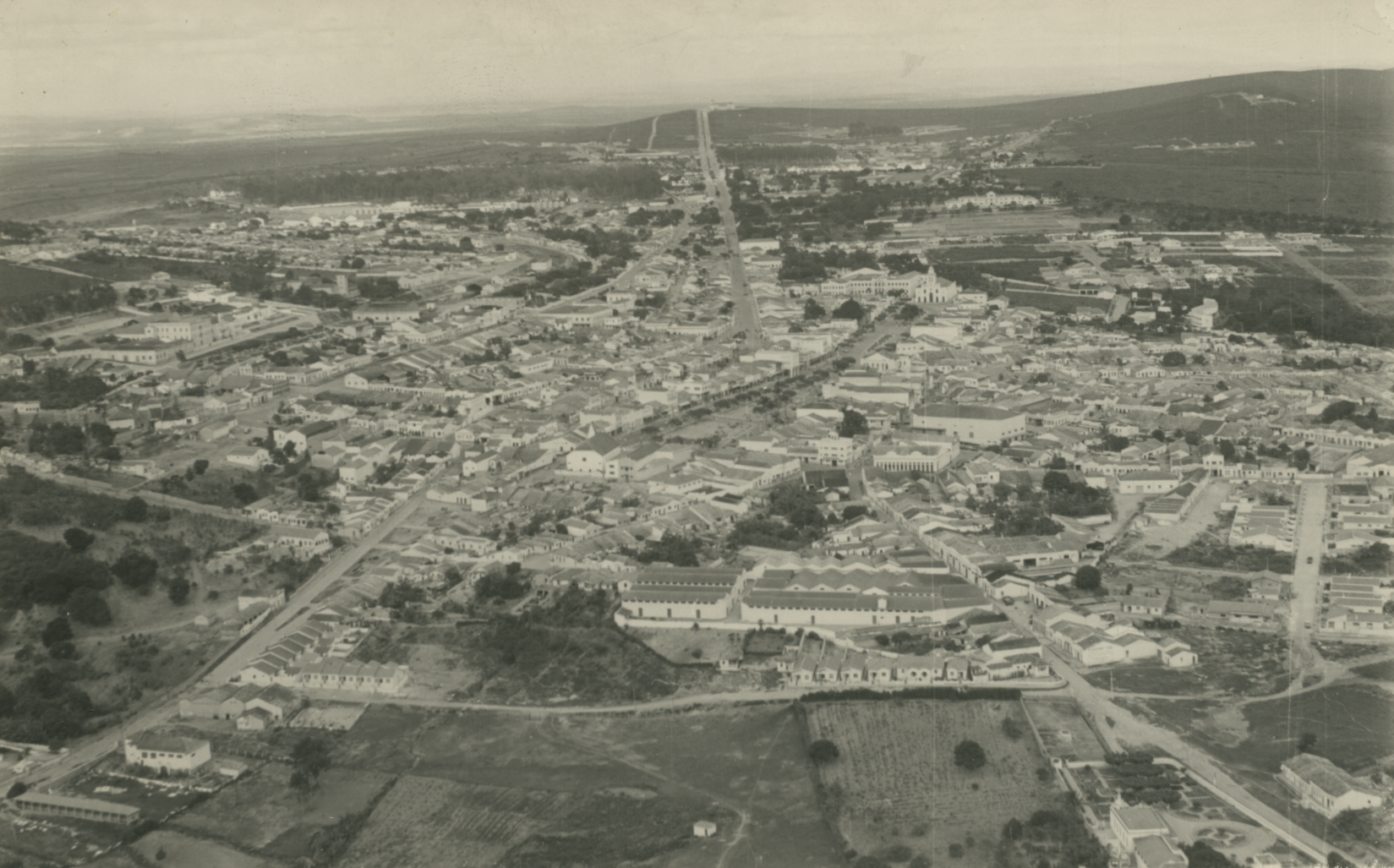
Garanhuns, August 1961. National Archives

European settlement of the lands now comprising Garanhuns began in the 17th century. White colonists and enslaved Africans escaping Dutch domination in Dutch Brazil established communities in the region's Caatinga moist-forest enclaves, establishing scattered villages. On 29 September 1658, Mestre de campo Nicolau Aranha Pacheco, Captain Cosmo de Brito Cação, Antonio Fernandes Aranha, and Ambrósio Aranha de Farias received a land grant of approximately 20 leagues from the acting governor, André Vidal de Negreiros. This grant included two plots: one in the fields of Garanhuns and another in Panema. That same year, the Garcia Farm was established in the area now encompassing the municipal seat. Evidence suggests the farm was thriving until around 1670, when it was destroyed during conflicts with quilombolas from Curica, in Alto do Magano, thereafter known as Tapera do Garcia, later simplified to Tapera. "Tapera" is an Old Tupi word meaning "extinct, destroyed village," now meaning "ruined house, abandoned house" in modern Portuguese.

The Palmares War (second half of the 17th century) significantly hindered the region's progress, as farms faced constant threats of territorial reclamation by resistant quilombola communities, forcing white, privileged, and slaveholding populations to abandon them. After the war ended in 1696, the region developed, and in 1699, a royal charter established judicial districts in various parishes in the hinterland, including Garanhuns, which became the seat of the "Ararobá Sertão Captaincy," encompassing the area between Cimbres and Pajeú das Flores.

In 1704, the Tapera do Garcia was purchased by Colonel Manuel Pereira de Azevedo. Following his death, it was managed by his widow, Dona Simoa Gomes de Azevedo. In 1756, she donated a half-league square of land to the Confraternity of Souls of the Garanhuns Parish, where the city later developed. With the creation of the Village of Cimbres in 1762 and its establishment the following year, Garanhuns lost its status as the captaincy seat, becoming merely the seat of the Santo Antônio de Garanhuns parish. In 1796, the local chapel ceased to be a curacy and became the seat of a deanery; on 15 August 1800, the parish of Santo Antônio of the Garanhuns settlement was established.

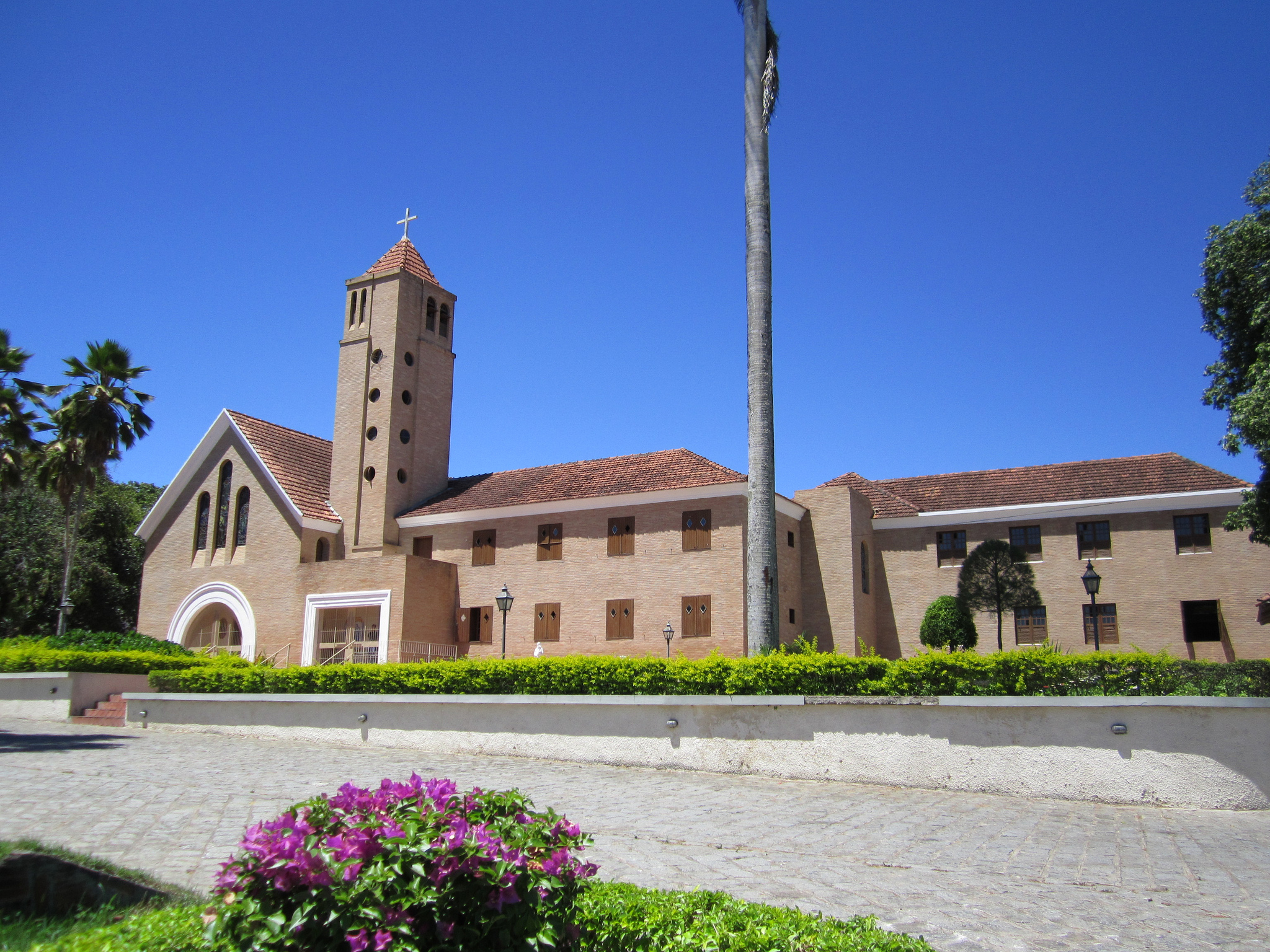
São José Seminary

By the late 19th century, the construction of a railway connecting Garanhuns to the capital of Pernambuco spurred significant economic and population growth, driven by the service industry. The reduced travel time between coastal and inland cities led to a rapid increase in hotels and guesthouses, boosting rural tourism. In the 1990s, the establishment of the city's winter festival solidified tourism as the region's primary income source.

Until early 2014, the municipality celebrated its emancipation on 4 February. This date was revised following research by the president of the Garanhuns Historical and Geographical Institute at the Museu do Tombo in Portugal. While searching for documents related to the attack by Domingos Jorge Velho on the city, the president discovered a Royal Charter signed by John IV, elevating Garanhuns to village status. This finding led to compliance with a constitutional law limiting municipalities to four holidays. Consequently, the emancipation day is now celebrated as a significant date, never falling on a weekday.

== Geography ==
Garanhuns and neighboring municipalities

According to the Brazilian Institute of Geography and Statistics, Garanhuns spans 458.55 km², with 7.11 km² forming the urban area and 451.44 km² comprising the rural zone. It is located at 08°53'25" south latitude and 36°29'34" west longitude, approximately 230 km from the state capital. Its neighboring municipalities are Capoeiras and Jucati to the north; Lagoa do Ouro and Correntes to the south; São João and Palmeirina to the east; and Caetés, Saloá, Paranatama, Brejão, and Terezinha to the west.

Garanhuns lies within the Reworked Surfaces geo-environmental unit, characterized by heavily eroded terrain with deeply incised valleys. Situated on the Borborema Plateau, the municipality is surrounded by the Antas, Columinho, Ipiranga, Magano, Monte Sinai, Quilombo, and Triunfo hills. Its altitude is 841 meters above sea level at the city's birthplace, though some areas, such as Monte Magano (1,030 m), exceed 1,000 meters.

Garanhuns is part of the Mundaú River basin, with its main watercourses being the Mundaú, Canhoto, and Inhaúma rivers, alongside streams such as São Pedro, São Vicente, Mimosinho, Seco, Mocambo, Repartição, Imbé, Mochila, Pacheco, das Pedras, Baixa da Lama, Estrondo, da Laje, do Dunga, Periperi, and Timbó. All watercourses are intermittent, following a dendritic drainage pattern. The most significant reservoirs are the Mundaú, with a capacity of 1,968,600 m³, and the Garanhuns public reservoir.

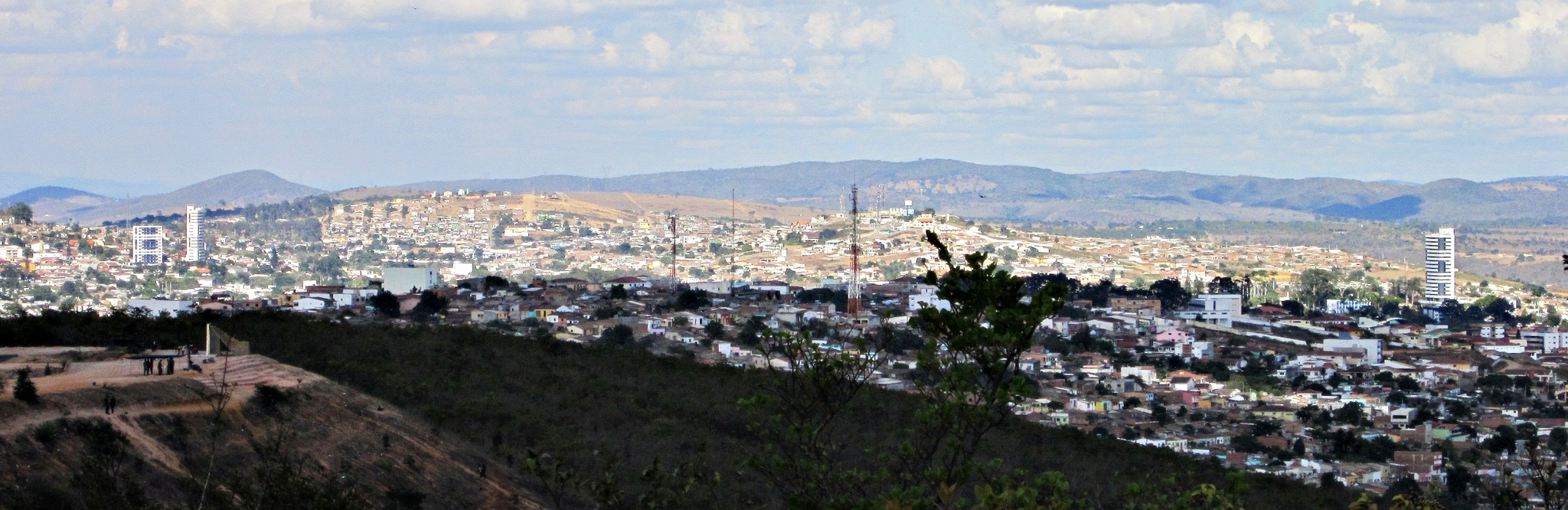
View of a section of the Garanhuns massif.

=== Climate ===
Largest 24-hour precipitation accumulations recorded in Garanhuns by month (INMET)
| Month | Accumulation | Date | Month | Accumulation | Date |
|---|---|---|---|---|---|
| January | 65.2 mm | 25 January 1969 | July | 100.8 mm | 2 July 2022 |
| February | 92.5 mm | 13 February 1976 | August | 49.6 mm | 17 August 1991 |
| March | 100.9 mm | 25 March 2005 | September | 35.4 mm | 5 September 2003 |
| April | 95.6 mm | 9 April 2010 | October | 68.7 mm | 5 October 1965 |
| May | 78.1 mm | 26 May 2017 | November | 55.7 mm | 12 November 1968 |
| June | 92.8 mm | 19 June 2010 | December | 114 mm | 27 December 2002 |
Period: 1963–present

Garanhuns has a tropical savanna climate, featuring a dry summer and wet winter, categorized as As in the Köppen climate classification (bordering on a Mediterranean climate, type Csa). Due to its elevation, temperatures are mild and cooler than in most of the region throughout the year. The average annual temperature is 21 °C, dropping to 15 °C or lower during the coldest months, which are also typically the rainiest. The annual precipitation index is approximately 890 mm, with relatively high humidity year-round. The average annual sunshine is 2,330 hours, peaking between October and December.

According to data from the weather station of the National Institute of Meteorology (INMET) in Garanhuns, since December 1963, the absolute minimum temperature recorded was 9 °C on 22 July 1999, and the historical maximum reached 35.3 °C on 5 September 1993. The highest 24-hour precipitation accumulation was 114 mm on 27 December 2002, followed by 100.9 mm on 25 March 2005, and 100.8 mm on 2 July 2022.

Climate data for Garanhuns (1981–2010 normals, extremes 1963–present)
| Month | Jan | Feb | Mar | Apr | May | Jun | Jul | Aug | Sep | Oct | Nov | Dec | Year |
|---|---|---|---|---|---|---|---|---|---|---|---|---|---|
| Record high °C (°F) | 34.8 (94.6) | 34.8 (94.6) | 33.6 (92.5) | 33.9 (93.0) | 32.3 (90.1) | 29.1 (84.4) | 29.5 (85.1) | 30.1 (86.2) | 35.3 (95.5) | 34.7 (94.5) | 34.7 (94.5) | 34.5 (94.1) | 35.3 (95.5) |
| Mean daily maximum °C (°F) | 29.0 (84.2) | 28.7 (83.7) | 28.5 (83.3) | 26.8 (80.2) | 25.2 (77.4) | 23.4 (74.1) | 22.6 (72.7) | 23.1 (73.6) | 24.9 (76.8) | 27.2 (81.0) | 28.7 (83.7) | 29.1 (84.4) | 26.4 (79.5) |
| Daily mean °C (°F) | 22.5 (72.5) | 22.5 (72.5) | 22.7 (72.9) | 21.9 (71.4) | 21.1 (70.0) | 19.6 (67.3) | 18.7 (65.7) | 18.7 (65.7) | 19.6 (67.3) | 21.1 (70.0) | 22.0 (71.6) | 22.5 (72.5) | 21.1 (70.0) |
| Mean daily minimum °C (°F) | 18.4 (65.1) | 18.6 (65.5) | 19.0 (66.2) | 18.8 (65.8) | 18.1 (64.6) | 17.2 (63.0) | 16.4 (61.5) | 16.1 (61.0) | 16.5 (61.7) | 17.2 (63.0) | 17.8 (64.0) | 18.2 (64.8) | 17.7 (63.9) |
| Record low °C (°F) | 15.4 (59.7) | 15.0 (59.0) | 14.7 (58.5) | 15.0 (59.0) | 14.4 (57.9) | 10.5 (50.9) | 9.0 (48.2) | 10.9 (51.6) | 10.0 (50.0) | 11.4 (52.5) | 12.8 (55.0) | 14.9 (58.8) | 9.0 (48.2) |
| Average precipitation mm (inches) | 43.5 (1.71) | 43.0 (1.69) | 68.8 (2.71) | 78.3 (3.08) | 119.4 (4.70) | 158.4 (6.24) | 141.3 (5.56) | 106.9 (4.21) | 54.1 (2.13) | 30.2 (1.19) | 14.0 (0.55) | 33.5 (1.32) | 891.4 (35.09) |
| Average relative humidity (%) | 75.3 | 77.7 | 78.8 | 83.8 | 87.9 | 90.7 | 91.4 | 89.6 | 85.8 | 78.7 | 74.3 | 73.6 | 82.3 |
| Mean monthly sunshine hours | 221.5 | 201.1 | 209.5 | 185.5 | 162.0 | 124.6 | 125.9 | 152.6 | 193.9 | 239.5 | 258.3 | 255.6 | 2,330 |
Source: INMET (precipitation: 1991–2020) temperature records: 1963–present)

=== Ecology and environment ===
Garanhuns is home to two predominant types of native vegetation: the Atlantic Forest and the Caatinga. To mitigate the environmental impact of urbanization, local authorities, particularly the municipal government, have implemented policies to create green spaces and areas for leisure, social interaction, and contemplation to enhance the quality of life for residents. The city features three municipal parks: Euclides Dourado Park, Ruber van der Linden Park, and the Mundaú River Springs Natural Park. The first two are classified as sustainable use units, while the latter is designated for full conservation.

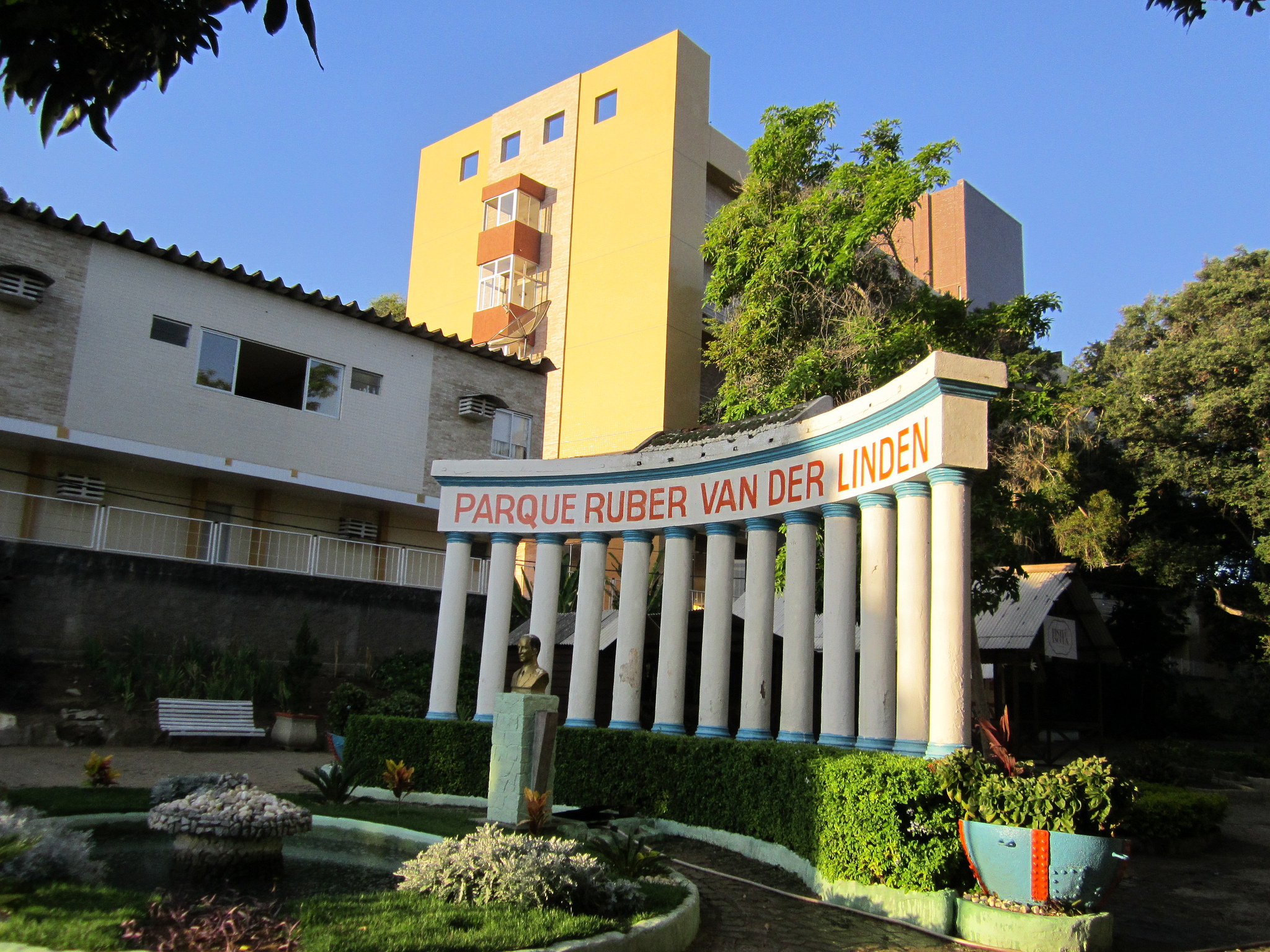
Ruber van der Linden Municipal Park

Euclides Dourado Municipal Park, also known as the "Eucalyptus Park," is the primary sustainable use unit and the first park established in Garanhuns. Originally an 8-hectare eucalyptus grove, it was transformed into a municipal park and zoo during the administration of Mayor Euclides Dourado in the late 1920s, making it the fifth oldest park in Brazil. Designed and built by Euclides Dourado and completed by his son, Luiz Souto Dourado, the park was renamed in honor of its creator in 1943 after his death. Located a short distance from downtown Garanhuns in the Heliópolis neighborhood, the park is primarily composed of century-old eucalyptus trees, a significant natural asset of the municipality. Over the years, it has been enhanced with recreational, sports, and children's facilities. It hosts one of Pernambuco's most important artistic and cultural events every year: the Garanhuns Winter Festival.

Ruber van der Linden Municipal Park is named after a distinguished Garanhuns resident, an electrical engineer who developed and implemented the city's water and electricity supply plan, serving as the general manager of the utility company. Established by Mayor Luiz da Silva Guerra, the park transformed the Pau-Pombo site—a scenic area with large trees and a spring—into a public visitation space. It has been improved over time to cater to residents and tourists seeking leisure and entertainment.

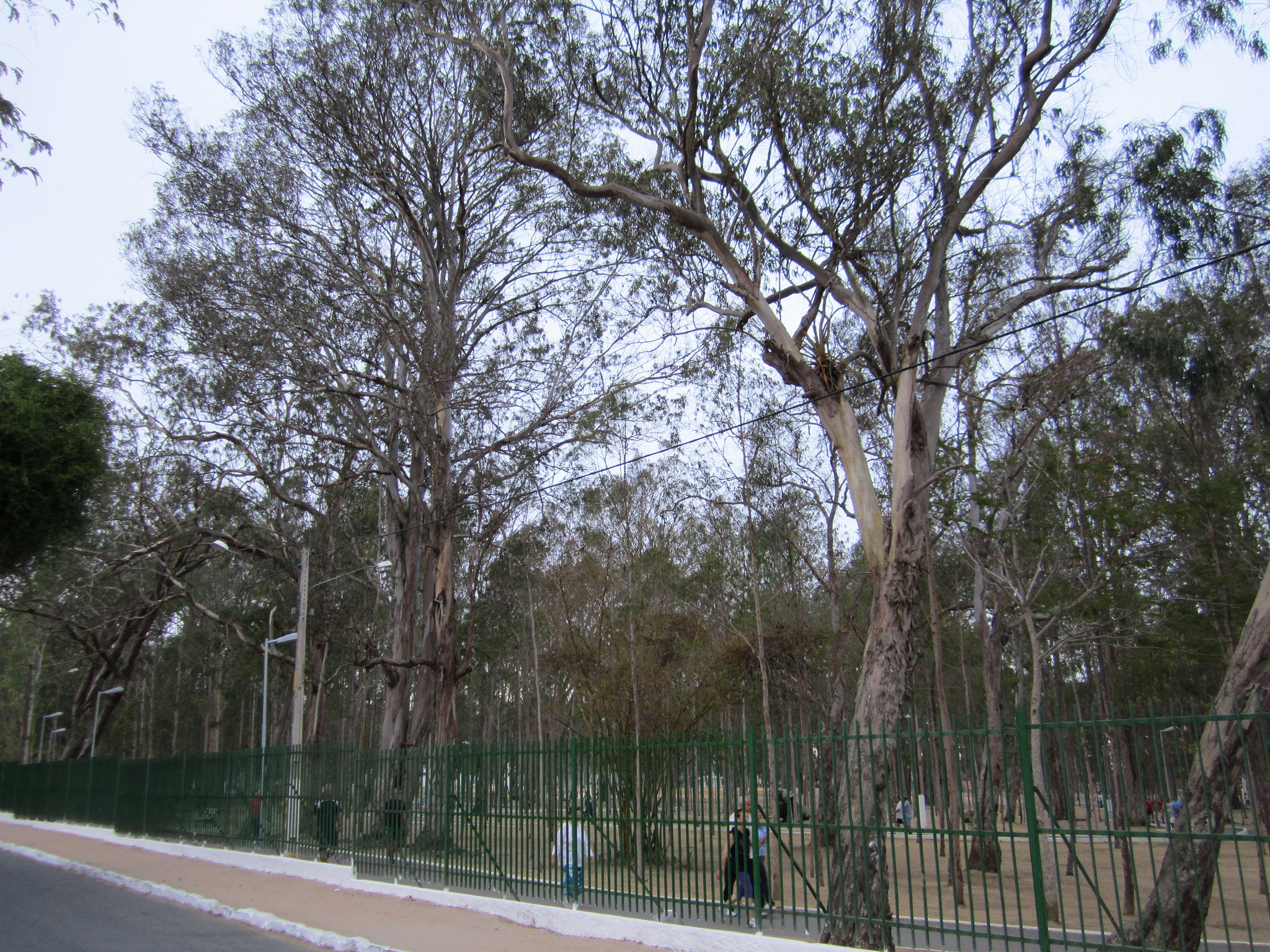
Euclides Dourado Park (Eucalyptus Park)

The Mundaú Springs Natural Municipal Park is located in the Várzea neighborhood, between urban and rural areas. The park hosts a municipal nursery project that produces fruit, tree, and ornamental seedlings. Spanning 34 hectares, it preserves 65 species of flora and 66 species of fauna, as cataloged by professionals from the former Agriculture and Environment Secretariat and the Municipal Environmental Defense Council.

In the northern and western parts of the municipality, where the Caatinga predominates, the vegetation consists of hyperxerophytic species, including shrubs with twisted branches and deep roots. Common species include cactus, caroá, aroeira, angico, juazeiro, mandacaru, and Deering's tree cactus. Contrary to common perceptions, the Caatinga fauna is diverse, hosting species such as the gray brocket, Brazilian guinea pig, opossum, cane toad, agouti, yellow armadillo, Spix's macaw, picazuro pigeon, and common marmoset.

In the southern and eastern regions, dominated by the Atlantic Forest, the vegetation comprises medium to large trees, forming dense, closed forests. This biome is highly biodiverse, with large trees creating a shaded, humid microclimate. Common species include palms, bromeliads, begonias, orchids, lianas, mosses, brazilwood, jacaranda, peroba, jequitibá-rosa, cedar, andira, pineapple, and fig trees. Many animal species in this biome, such as the golden lion tamarin, howler monkey, giant anteater, giant armadillo, glaucous macaw, and jaguar, are endangered.

== Demography ==
Historical population
| Year | Pop. | ±% |
|---|---|---|
| 1970 | 71,623 | — |
| 1980 | 87,038 | +21.5% |
| 1991 | 103,341 | +18.7% |
| 2000 | 117,749 | +13.9% |
| 2010 | 129,408 | +9.9% |
| 2022 | 142,506 | +10.1% |
Source: Brazilian Institute of Geography and Statistics (IBGE)

According to the 2010 census by the Brazilian Institute of Geography and Statistics, Garanhuns had a population of 129,408 inhabitants, with 68,432 females (52.88%) and 60,976 males (47.12%). Of these, 115,356 lived in the urban area (89.14%), and 14,052 resided in the rural zone (10.86%). The urbanization rate was 89.14%. The 2014 IBGE population estimate recorded 136,057 inhabitants, making Garanhuns the ninth largest municipality in Pernambuco, with a population density of 287.97 inhabitants/km².

In 2010, 34,399 people (26.58%) were under 15 years old, 85,293 (65.91%) were between 15 and 64, and 9,716 (7.51%) were over 65. The life expectancy was 72.7 years, and the total fertility rate was 1.9 children per woman. The Human Development Index (HDI-M) of Garanhuns is 0.664, classified as medium by the United Nations Development Programme (UNDP), ranking 16th among Pernambuco municipalities but below the state average of 0.673. Nationally, it ranks 2802nd among 5,570 Brazilian municipalities.

Based on the 2010 IBGE census self-declarations, the population comprised 52,678 whites (40.71%), 6,166 blacks (4.76%), 1,596 Asians (1.23%), 68,722 pardos (53.10%), and 246 indigenous people (0.19%). By region of birth, 125,186 were born in the Northeast (96.74%), 3,375 in the Southeast (2.61%), 110 in the North (0.08%), and 102 in the Central-West (0.08%). Of the total, 120,199 were born in Pernambuco (92.88%), with 91,006 born in Garanhuns (70.32%). Among the 9,209 residents born in other states, Alagoas had the highest representation with 2,968 people (2.29%), followed by São Paulo with 2,891 (2.23%), and Paraíba with 737 (0.57%).

=== Poverty and Inequality ===
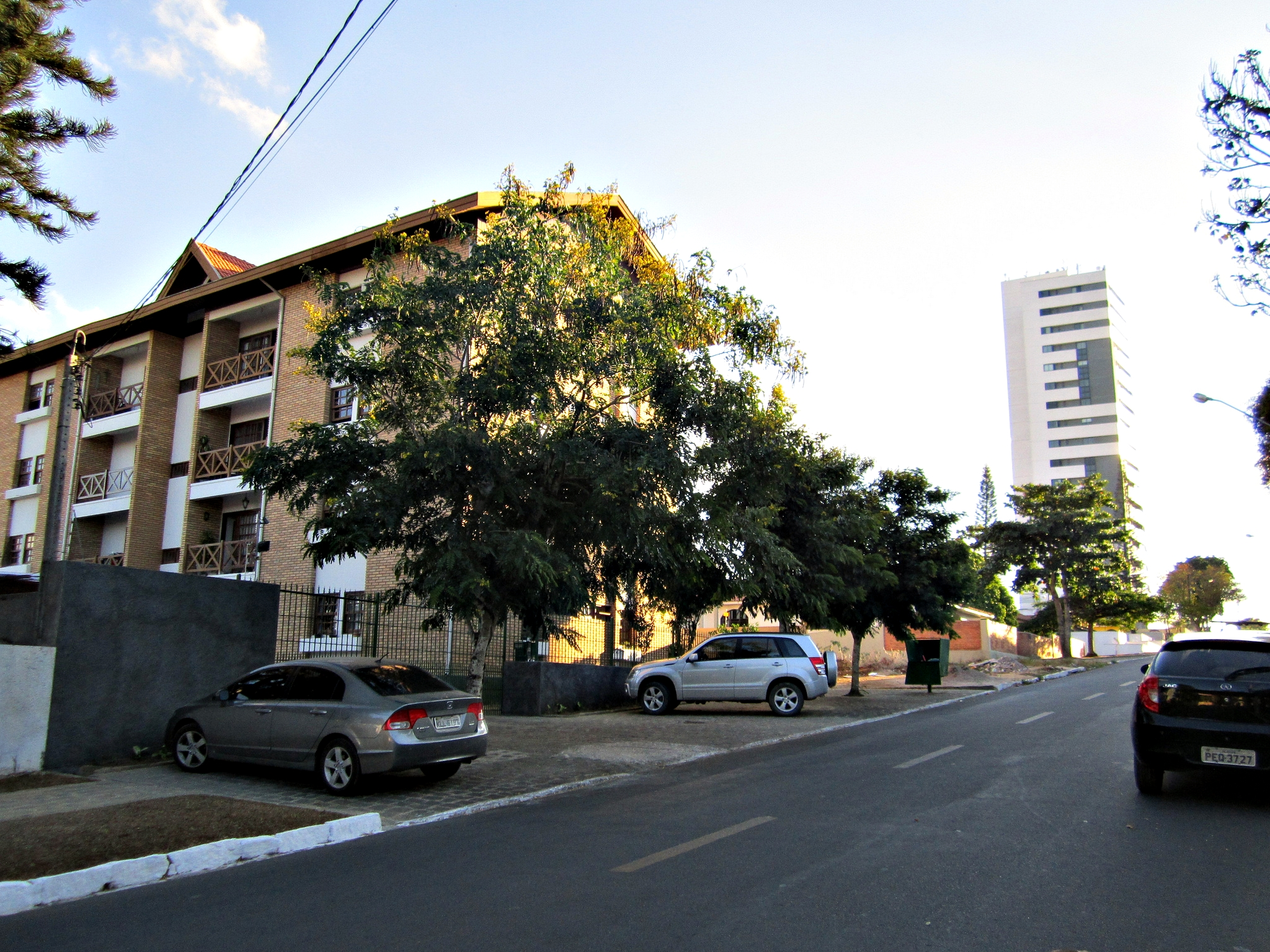
Street in the Heliópolis neighborhood

In 2000, 43.3% of the population lived with a per capita income below 140 reais, a figure that decreased to approximately 28.3% by 2010. Despite this reduction, about 36,143 people remain in poverty. In 2010, 71.7% of residents were above the poverty and indigence line, 20.6% were at the line, and 22.8% were below it. The Gini coefficient, which measures regional inequality, was 0.599 in 2010, with values closer to 0.00 indicating less inequality and closer to 1.00 indicating greater inequality. The share of the poorest 20% in the municipality's wealth decreased from 2.7% in 1991 to 2.4% in 2010, indicating rising inequality. The richest 20% accounted for 62.3% of the municipal wealth in 2010, 26 times higher than the poorest 20%.

Despite its moderate population, Garanhuns has communities and degraded areas lacking access to basic services such as potable water, sewage collection and treatment, and paved streets. Although irregular housing exists, the 2010 IBGE census did not identify any subnormal agglomerates, as their number is small and does not meet all criteria.

In early 2013, the Central Única das Favelas (CUFA) began operating in Garanhuns following meetings between project representatives and municipal officials. Partnerships were established with the municipal government, particularly with the Secretariats of Social Assistance, Human Rights, Health, Education, and the Sports Directorate.

=== Religion ===
According to the 2010 census by the Brazilian Institute of Geography and Statistics, most Garanhuns residents identify as Catholic (76.8%). Spiritism is less common, with 1.01% adherence, while evangelical denominations are prevalent, collectively representing 16.4%. Followers of African diaspora religions, such as Umbanda (0.01%), are minimal, with no recorded adherents of Candomblé. Eastern religions, including Buddhism (0.01%), Hinduism (0.02%), and Islam, showed negligible or no presence. Practitioners of esoteric traditions accounted for 0.1%. Those identifying as non-religious comprised 4.0%, atheists and agnostics 0.14% and 0.1%, respectively, and those with undetermined religion or multiple affiliations were 0.15%.

Roman Catholic Church

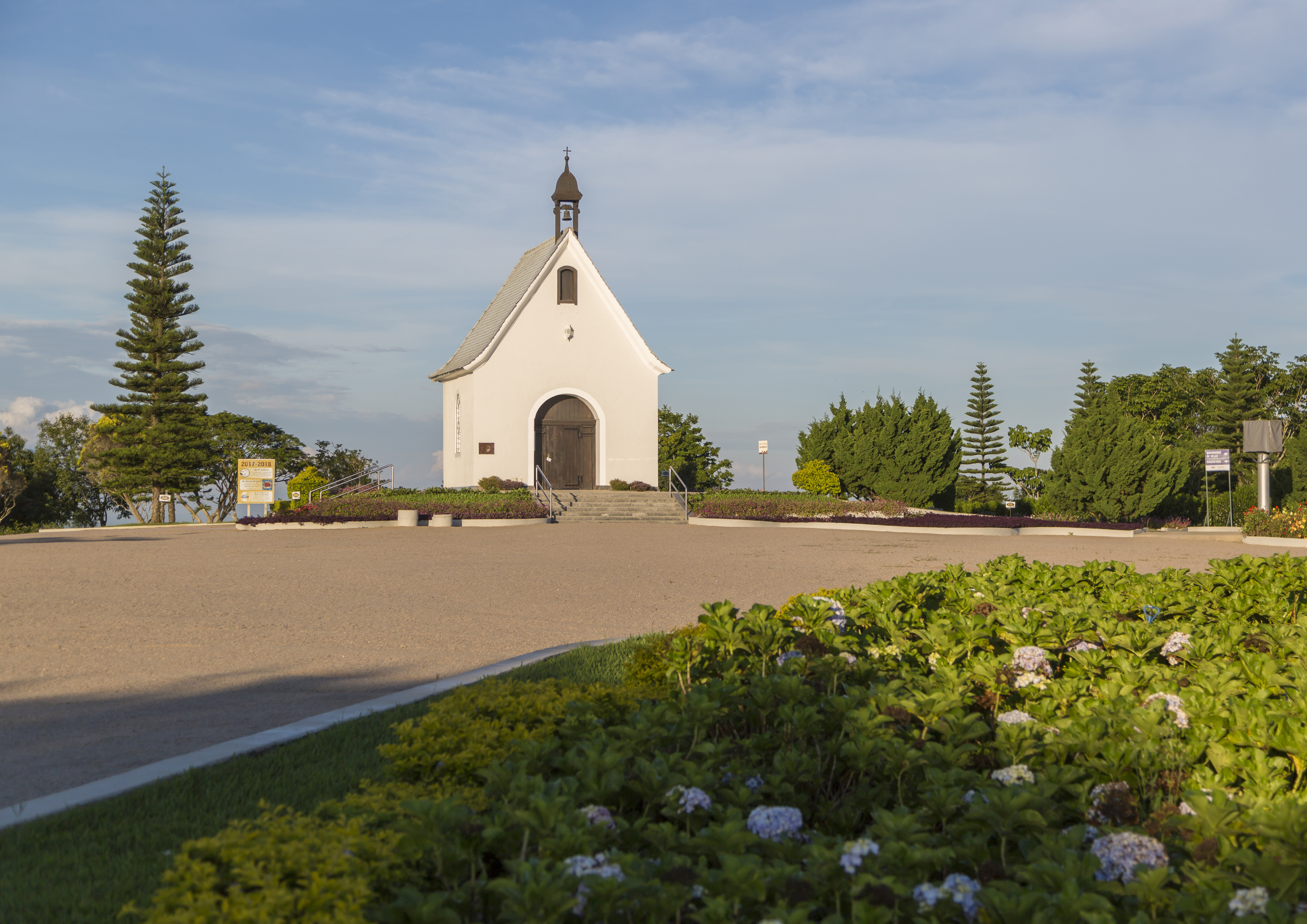
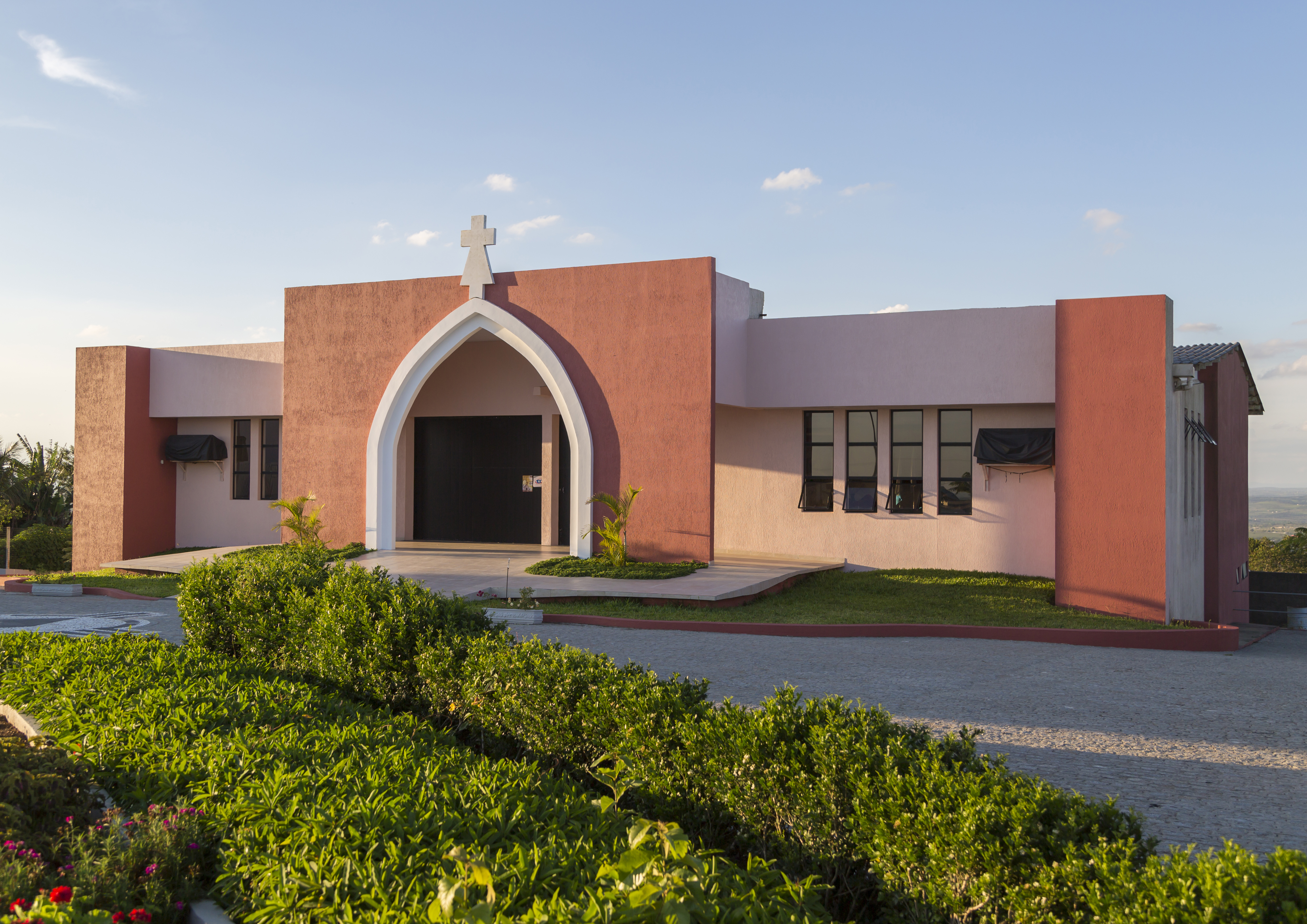
Mother Queen Sanctuary

According to the organization of the Catholic Church, Garanhuns is part of the Ecclesiastical Province of Olinda and Recife, headquartered in Olinda, within the Recife Metropolitan Region, under the Archdiocese of Olinda and Recife. The Diocese of Garanhuns was proposed by Monsignor Afonso Pequeno and endorsed by the then-archbishop of Olinda and Recife, Dom Sebastião Leme da Silveira Cintra. It was officially established by Pope Benedict XV through the bull "Archidioecesís Olindensis et Recifensis" on 2 August 1918, when it was separated from the archdiocese of the capital. The same bull created the Dioceses of Nazaré da Mata and Pesqueira. The diocese encompasses 26 Pernambucan municipalities, including two in the Forest Zone (Quipapá and São Benedito do Sul) and 24 in the Agreste, including Bom Conselho, São Bento do Una, and Lajedo.

The community comprises six parishes: Nossa Senhora do Perpétuo Socorro, Santa Teresa do Menino Jesus, Santo Antônio (Cathedral), São Sebastião, Sagrada Família, and Sagrado Coração de Jesus.

Protestant Churches

Garanhuns has a significant number of evangelical churches across various denominations. The Assembly of God is the most prominent, with 3.8% of the population, followed by the Presbyterian Church (established in 1900) at 1.60%, and the Christian Congregation in Brazil at 1.48%. Other notable evangelical churches include the Universal Church of the Kingdom of God (0.96%), Maranatha Christian Church (0.15%), Foursquare Church (0.08%), Brazil for Christ Pentecostal Church (0.06%), God Is Love Pentecostal Church, and House of Blessing Church (0.05% each). According to the IBGE, evangelicals are further categorized as Mission Evangelicals (4.0%) and Pentecostal (7.6%). Followers of evangelical churches without a specific denomination accounted for 4.6%.

Other Christian minorities include Jehovah's Witnesses (0.34%) and members of The Church of Jesus Christ of Latter-day Saints (0.26%). Adherents of spiritualism represented 0.01%.

== Political and administrative organization ==
The municipality of Garanhuns is governed by a political-administrative structure comprising the Executive Branch, led by a mayor elected by universal suffrage, who is directly supported by appointed municipal secretaries, and the Legislative Branch, embodied by the Garanhuns Municipal Chamber, a collegial body of 17 councilors also elected by universal suffrage.

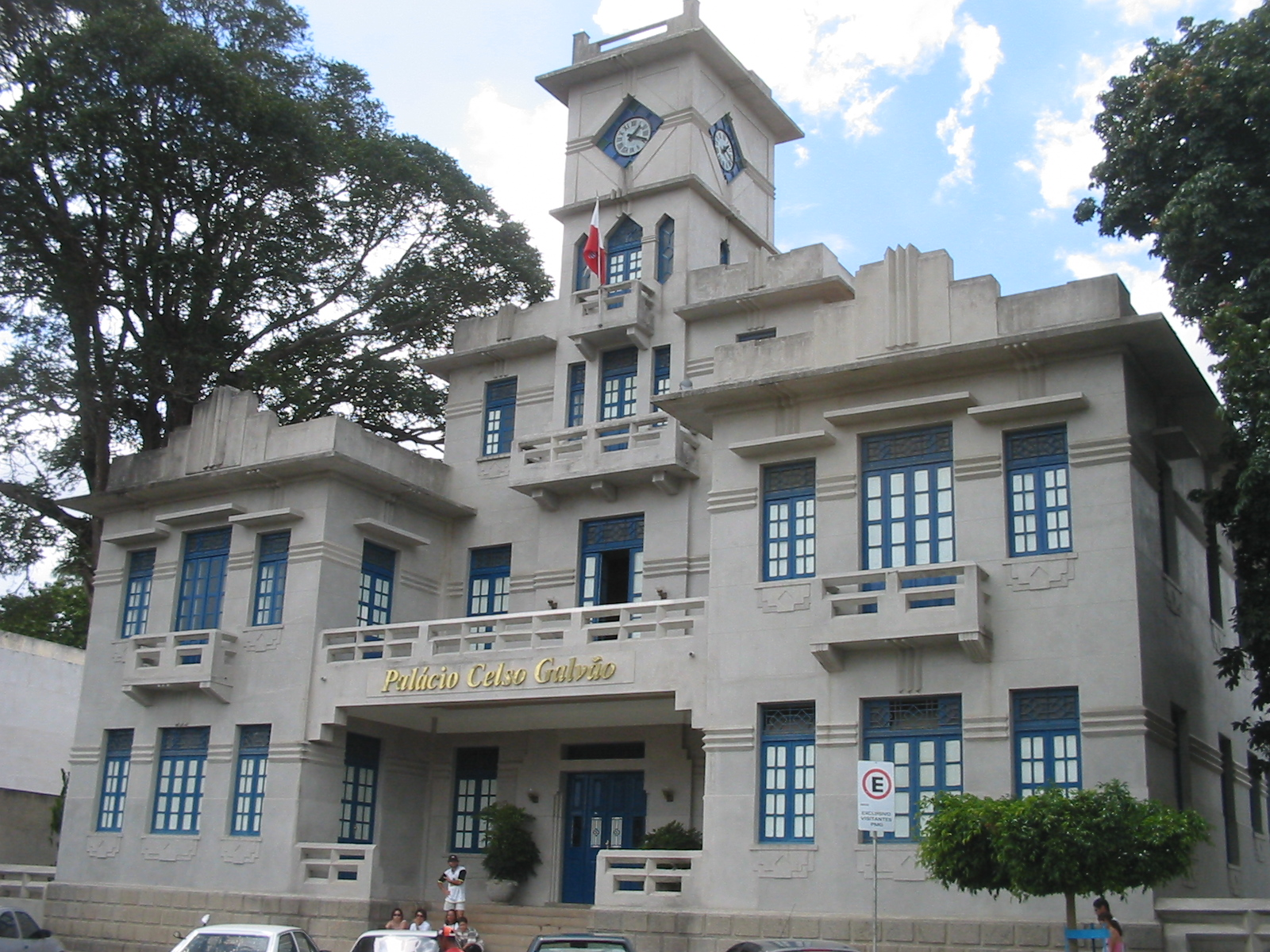
Celso Galvão Palace, seat of the municipal government

The municipality operates under an organic law, promulgated on 4 April 1990, effective from the same date. It is the seat of the Comarca of Garanhuns. According to the Pernambuco Regional Electoral Court (TRE-PE), in 2020, Garanhuns had 90,841 registered voters, making it the tenth largest electoral district in Pernambuco.

=== Current municipal authorities of Garanhuns ===
- Mayor: Sivaldo Rodrigues Albino - PSB (2021–)
- Vice Mayor: Pedro Henrique Lima Velôso - PT (2021–)
- President of the Municipal Chamber: Senivaldo Rodrigues Albino "Johny Albino" - PSB (2021–)

== Subdivisions ==
Garanhuns is divided into four districts: Miracica, Iratama, São Pedro, and the seat district. The seat district is the most populous, with 116,016 inhabitants, followed by São Pedro with 5,967, created by State Decree-Law No. 952 on 31 December 1943, the same decree and date as Iratama. Miracica was established by Decree-Law No. 235 on 9 December 1938. The seat district comprises 17 neighborhoods:

Districts of Garanhuns (IBGE/2010)
| District | Population | | | Private Households |
| | Men | Women | Total | |
|---|---|---|---|---|
| São Pedro | 3,044 | 2,923 | 5,967 | 2,064 |
| Miracica | 1,923 | 1,882 | 3,805 | 1,366 |
| Iratama | 1,796 | 1,804 | 3,600 | 1,182 |
| Garanhuns | 54,213 | 61,823 | 116,036 | 38,772 |

== Economy ==
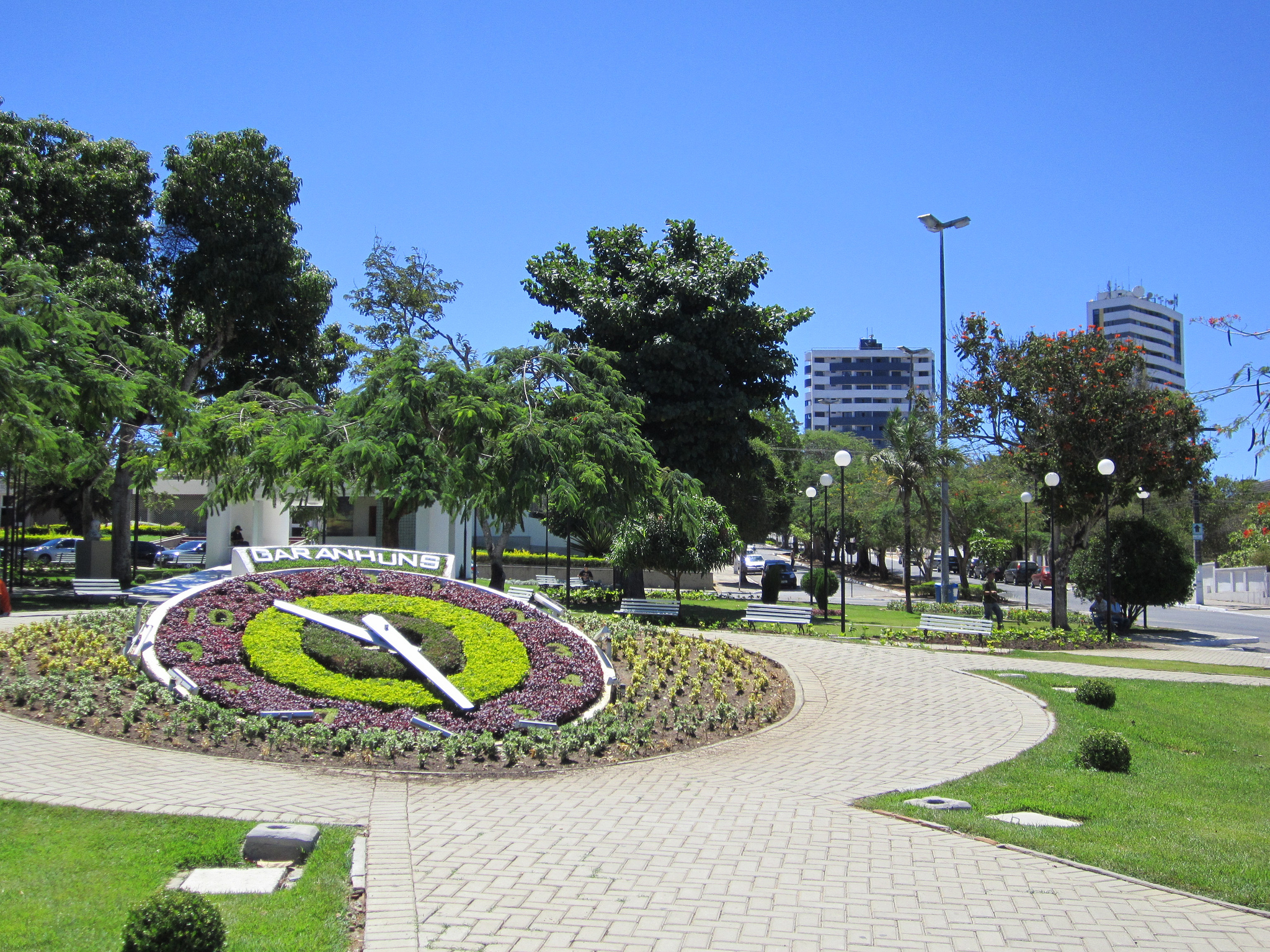
Tourism significantly drives Garanhuns' economy during certain periods. Pictured: the Flower Clock

According to the Brazilian Institute of Geography and Statistics, Garanhuns' Gross Domestic Product (GDP) is the 413th largest in Brazil and the 11th largest in Pernambuco. In 2011, the GDP was R$ 1,201,225 thousand, with R$ 149,558 thousand in taxes on products net of subsidies at current prices. The per capita GDP was R$ 9,218.71.

In 2010, 62.02% of the population aged 18 or older was economically active, with an unemployment rate of 10.86%. The 2011 Central Business Register reported approximately 2,607 local units and 2,469 active companies, including commercial establishments. About 19,059 workers were employed, with 16,325 being salaried. Salaries and other remunerations totaled 227,577 thousand reais, with an average monthly salary of 2.0 minimum wages. In 2010, 72.78% of households earned less than one minimum wage per resident, 17.77% earned one or more, 2.84% earned between three and five, 2.35% earned over five, and 4.24% had no income.

=== Primary sector ===
The primary sector is the least significant in Garanhuns' economy, contributing only R$ 24,628 thousand to the total wealth generated. About 14.47% of the workforce is employed in this sector. The 2012 livestock census reported 29,200 cattle, 510 goats, 168 donkeys, 1,000 horses, 150 mules, 7,600 sheep, and 2,550 pigs. The municipality also had 980,700 poultry (roosters, hens, chickens, and chicks), 106,600 laying hens producing 1,360 eggs, and 5,600 cows milked, yielding 7,056 liters of milk. Additionally, 200 kg of honey was produced.

Garanhuns is notable for its artisanal, semi-artisanal, and industrial production of dairy products. Its dairy basin supplies industries producing cheese, mozzarella, butter, ricotta, chocolate milk, yogurt, and sweets. Parmalat is the main company served, with its unit supplying the North and Northeast regions with products such as UHT milk, pasteurized milk, flavored milk, condensed milk, cream, and powdered milk, supported by 192 producers from the southern Pernambucan Agreste.

Production of banana, cashew nut, and coffee (2012)
| Product | Harvested area (hectares) | Production (tonnes) |
|---|---|---|
| Banana | 60 | 10 |
| Cashew nut | 56 | 70 |
| Coffee | 50 | 70 |

According to the 2012 IBGE survey, notable temporary crop production included beans (418 tonnes, 30,000 hectares planted, 2,370 harvested); sweet potato (60 tonnes, 10 hectares); maize (60 tonnes, 1,000 hectares planted, 500 harvested); watermelon (36 tonnes, 4 hectares); cassava (10,400 tonnes, 1,300 hectares); tomato (9,300 tonnes, 230 hectares); tobacco (2 tonnes, 2 hectares); and fava bean (2 tonnes, 20 hectares planted, 10 harvested). Permanent crops highlighted included banana (60 tonnes, 10 hectares); cashew nut (56 tonnes, 70 hectares); coffee (50 tonnes, 100 hectares); orange (30 tonnes, 10 hectares); avocado (24 tonnes, 3 hectares); lemon (3 tonnes, 2 hectares); and tangerine (3 tonnes, 2 hectares).

=== Secondary sector ===
In 2011, the industrial sector was the second-largest contributor to Garanhuns' wealth, generating approximately R$ 233,712 thousand of the GDP. In 2010, 0.11% of the workforce over 18 was employed in the extractive industry, and 7.11% in the manufacturing industry. As of early 2014, the city lacked a designated industrial district, hindering new industrial development. Notable industries include a Unilever factory, and food-focused industries, particularly dairy, such as Parmalat and Bom Gosto, both part of the LBR group.

Garanhuns is home to an Expanded Logistics Business Industrial Cell (CIELA) in the COHAB 3 neighborhood, which includes small industries that generate significant employment and contribute to the city's growth.

=== Tertiary sector ===
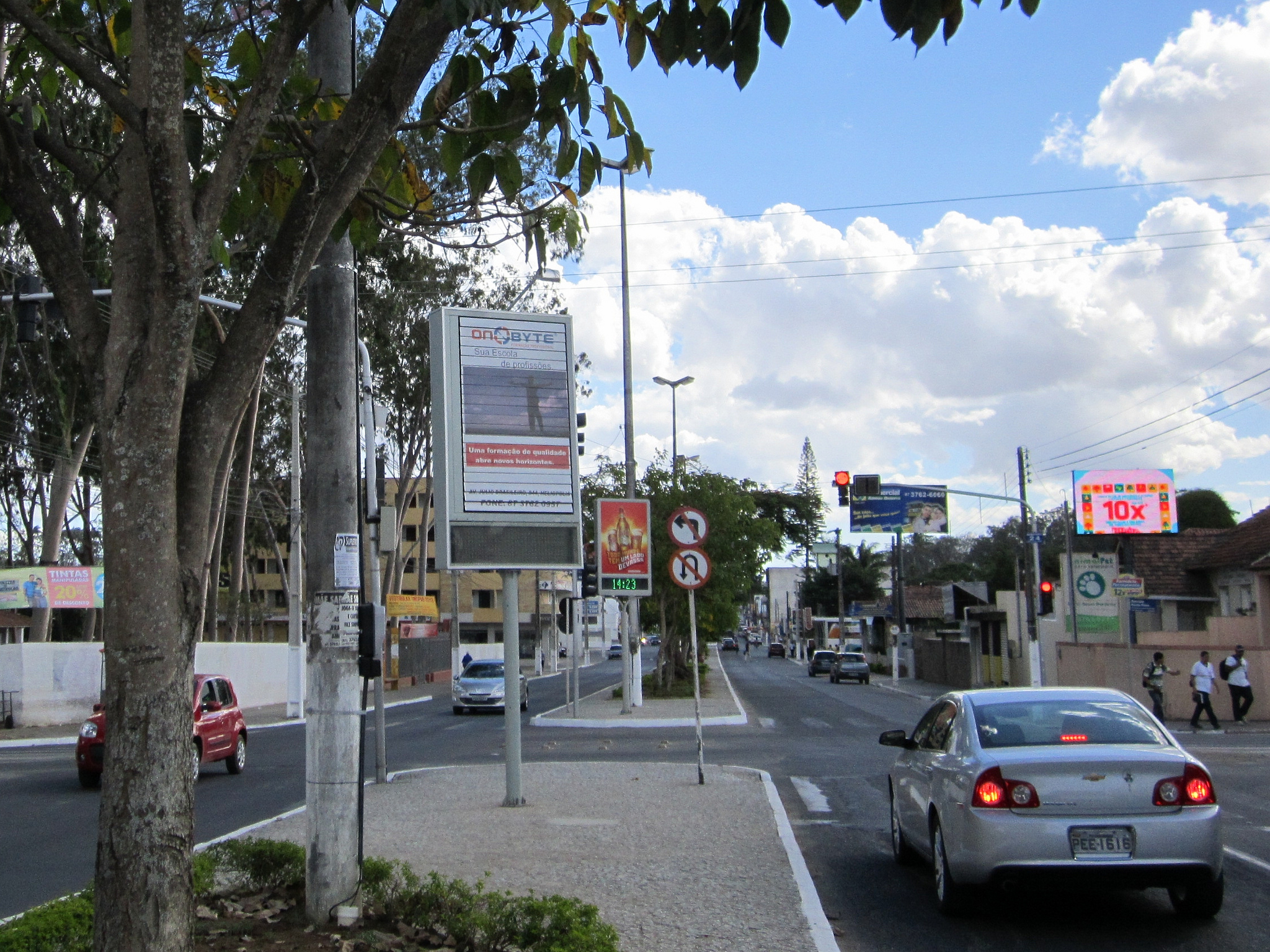
Commercial advertisements in the city

In 2010, according to data from the United Nations Development Programme's Atlas, 6.59% of employed individuals over 18 years old worked in the construction sector, 1.30% in public utilities, 21.27% in commerce, and 43.64% in the service sector. In absolute numbers, in 2012, approximately 6,577 people were employed in commerce, and a total of 4,856 were engaged in service activities. According to IBGE's Regional Accounts for 2011, the tertiary sector was the largest contributor to the municipality's wealth, accounting for 75.44% of Garanhuns' economy, with a gross value of R$ 793,327 thousand.

Garanhuns' commerce is highly diverse, a key characteristic of its centralizing role in the southern Agreste region of Pernambuco. Its commercial hub is served by a wide variety of national and international retail chains, including stores such as Casas Bahia, Cacau Show, Subway, Lojas Americanas, Magazine Luiza, Pague Menos, Todo Dia, Don Pastello, Assaí Atacadista, Clube Melissa, Damyller, among others. In 1876, the city saw the founding of the largest construction materials retailer, Ferreira Costa Home Center, established by Portuguese immigrant João Ferreira da Costa.

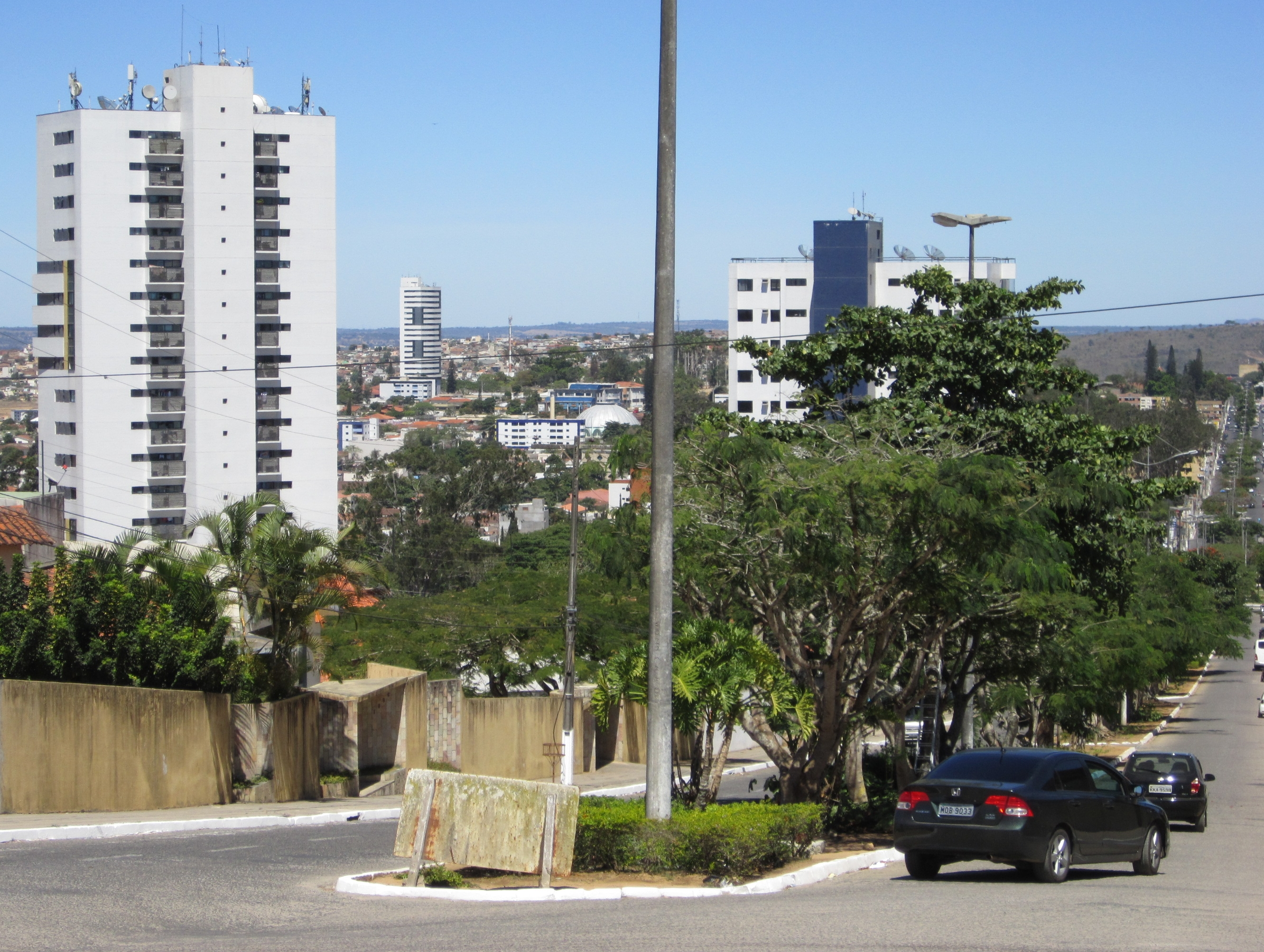
View of Garanhuns from the 9th Military Police Battalion

Garanhuns has a small shopping center, the Rui Barbosa Mall, offering a wide range of stores and dining options. It is located on Rui Barbosa Avenue.

== Infrastructure ==
=== Healthcare ===
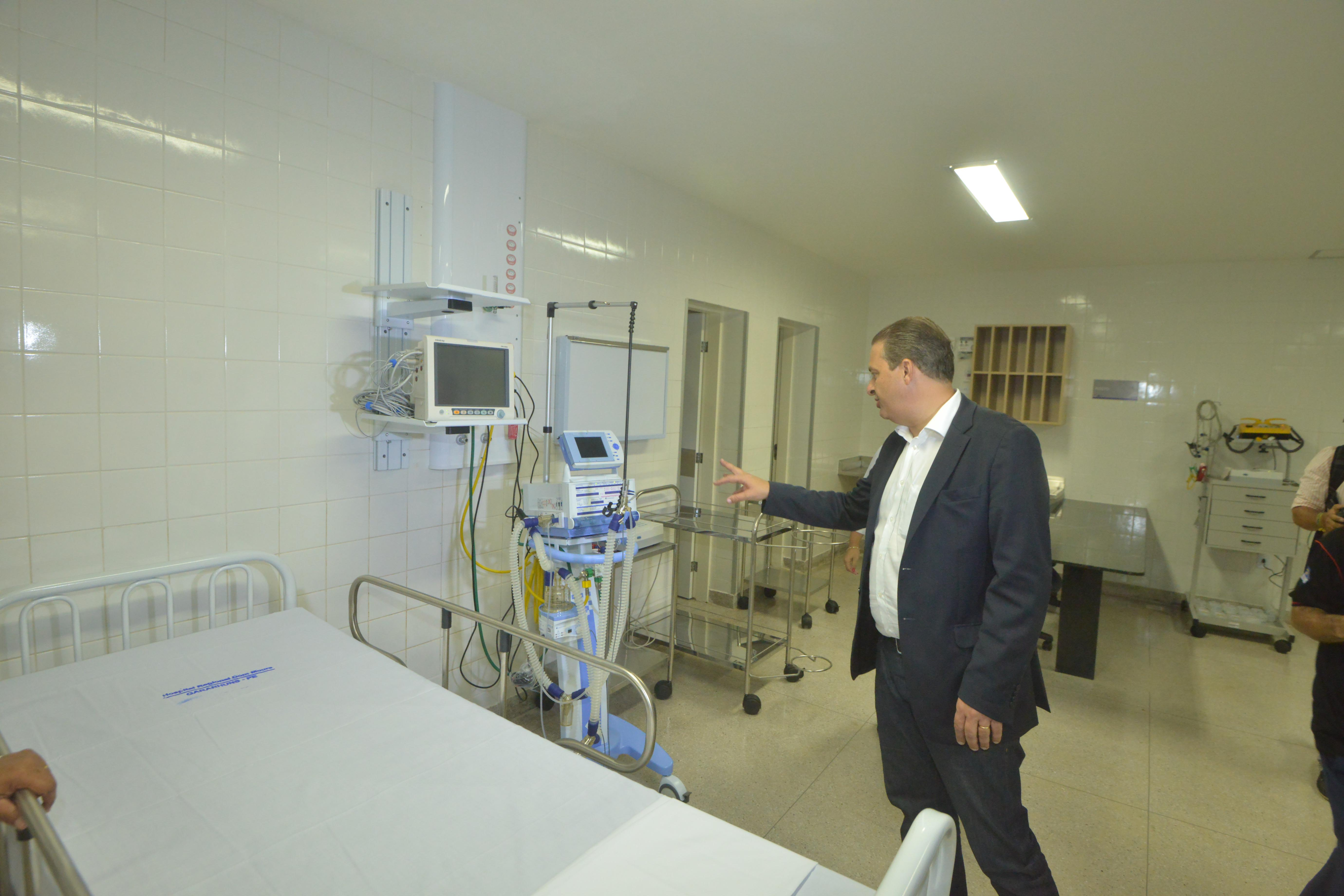
Dom Moura Regional Hospital

In 2009, the municipality had 75 healthcare facilities, including hospitals, emergency rooms, health centers, and dental services, with a total of 32 private and 42 public establishments. Of these, 524 inpatient beds were recorded, with 164 in the public sector and 360 in the private sector. In 2012, approximately 98.5% of children under one year old had up-to-date vaccination records. In the same year, the municipality recorded 5,458 live births, with an infant mortality rate of 17.0 deaths per thousand live births. In 2010, 6.34% of women aged 10 to 17 had children, with 0.65% aged 10 to 14 and 5.69% aged 14 to 17, and the activity rate in this age group was 5.96%.

The number of children under two years old weighed by the Family Health Program was 84.9%, with 1.2% of them classified as malnourished. In 2010, Garanhuns' Human Development Index (HDI) for longevity was 0.795, considered medium. According to Ministry of Health data, between 1991 and 2011, 665 AIDS cases were reported, with 228 cases diagnosed in women and 437 in men. Between 2001 and 2011, 13,007 cases of mosquito-borne diseases were recorded, including 5 cases of malaria, 105 cases of leishmaniasis, and no cases of yellow fever.

The city is equipped with the following facilities: a Hemotherapy Care Center; a Psychosocial Care Center; a Family Health Support Center; Primary Healthcare Units; Specialized Clinics (two public and five private); Isolated Clinics (all private); Specialized Hospitals; five General Hospitals (public, philanthropic, and private); Polyclinics (philanthropic); Health Centers and Health Secretariat; Diagnostic and Therapy Support Service Units (public and private); and a Mobile Terrestrial Unit. Among its main hospitals are the Dom Moura Regional Hospital, Santa Terezinha Municipal Hospital, and Palmira Sales Children's Hospital.

=== Education ===
Indicators

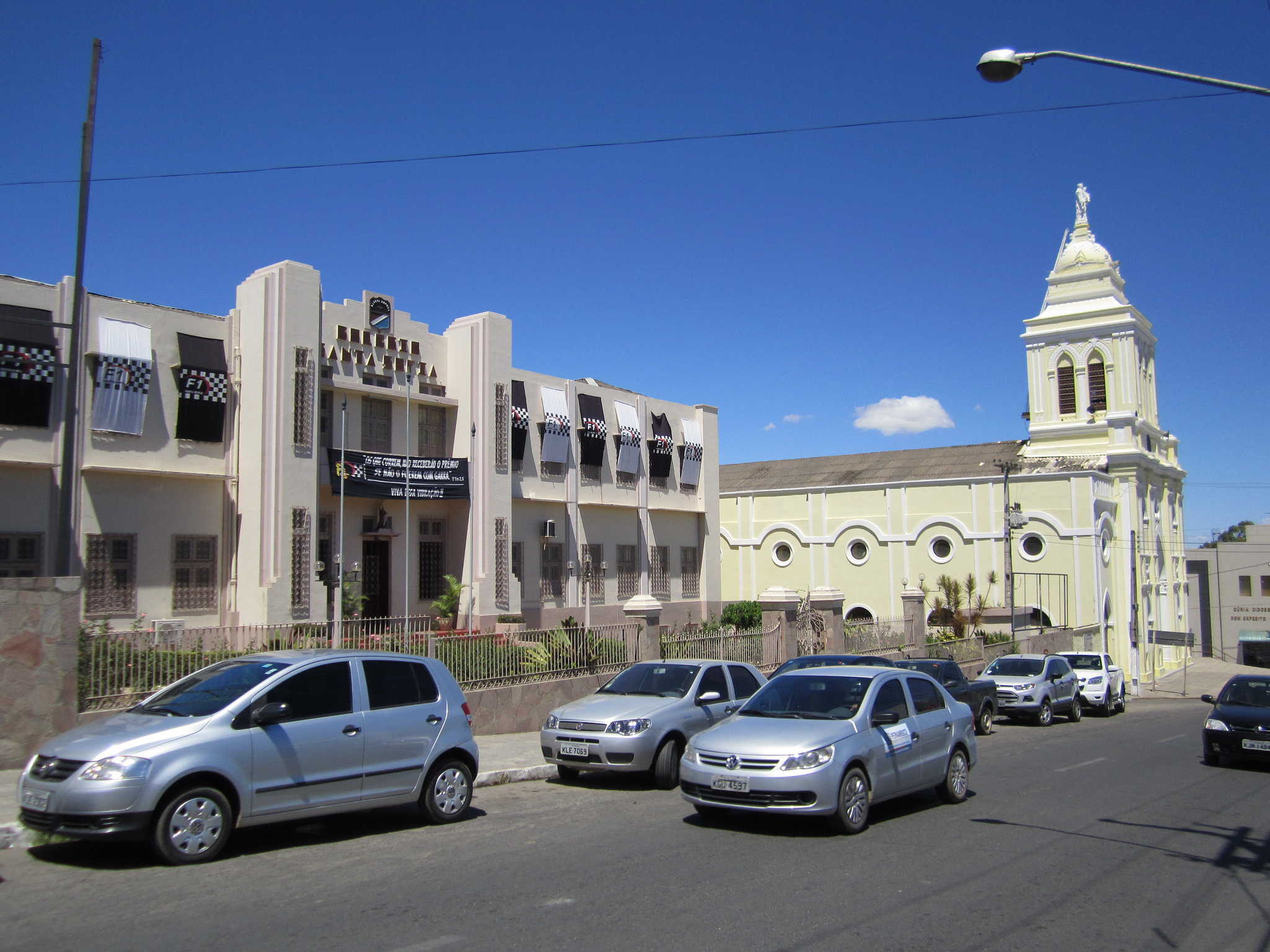
Santa Sofia School, in the city center

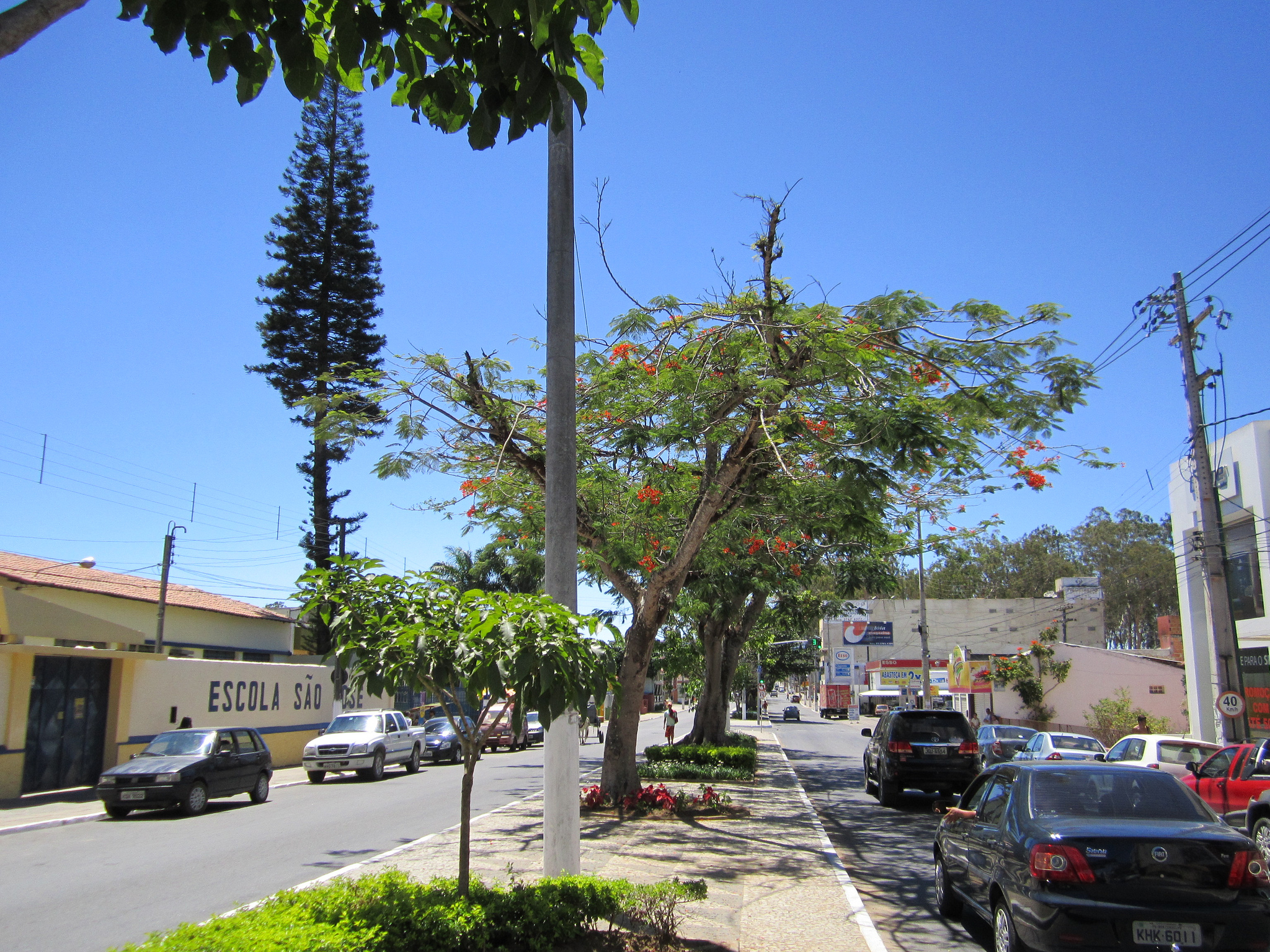
São José School, in the Heliópolis neighborhood

In the education sector, the score obtained in the Basic Education Development Index (IDEB) by Garanhuns' public schools in 2011 was 3.9 for the early years (5th grade) and 3.5 for the final years (3rd year of high school). The index ranges from 0 to 10, with 4.0 being the national average for early years in Brazilian schools. The Human Development Index (HDI) for education in 2010 was 0.556.

In 2010, 3.15% of children aged 6 to 14 were not enrolled in elementary school. The proportion of youths aged 15 to 17 with completed elementary education was 43.0%, and the literacy rate among youths and adolescents aged 15 to 24 was 94.9%. The age-grade distortion, where students are older than the recommended age for their grade, affected 21.4% of early-year students, 33.9% of final-year students, and reached 38.4% in high school. The percentage of residents over 18 with completed elementary education was 46.62%, and among those aged 18 to 20, it was 27.84%. In 2010, Garanhuns had an expected 9.26 years of schooling.

Educational network

According to data from the 2010 demographic census sample, of the total population, 42,095 attended daycare centers and/or schools. Of this total, 892 attended daycare centers, 3,939 were in preschool, 2,175 were in literacy programs, 341 in youth and adult literacy programs, 22,408 in elementary school, 1,497 in youth and adult education for elementary school, 5,364 in regular high school, 1,345 in youth and adult education for high school, 386 in graduate specialization, 3,647 in undergraduate courses, 64 in master's degree programs, and 36 in doctorate programs. In 2012, the municipality recorded a total of 33,635 enrollments in its educational institutions, with 111 schools offering elementary education: 39 private, 15 state-run, and 57 municipal. Of the 19 schools offering high school education, four were private, and 15 were state-run. Additionally, an important educational institution in the city is the Garanhuns campus of the Federal Institute of Pernambuco (IFPE), offering technical courses. The courses offered include Electronics, Information Technology, and Environmental Studies. These courses serve both local students and those from cities located around Garanhuns, contributing to the technological and environmental development of the southern Agreste region. In 2017, IFPE also began offering a bachelor's degree in Electrical Engineering.

Education in Garanhuns in numbers (2012)
| Level | Enrollments | Teachers | Schools (Total) |
|---|---|---|---|
| Early childhood education | 3,691 | 194 | 75 |
| Primary education | 23,030 | 1,000 | 111 |
| Secondary education | 6,914 | 338 | 19 |

Higher education

Garanhuns is home to a campus of one of the state's leading universities, the University of Pernambuco (UPE), which offers undergraduate degree programs in computer science, literature, mathematics, pedagogy, and history. It is also home to a branch of the Federal Rural University of Pernambuco, offering undergraduate programs in agronomy, computer science, food engineering, literature and pedagogy, veterinary medicine, and animal science, as well as postgraduate programs: A Master's in Ruminant Health and Reproduction, a Master's in Agricultural Production, and a Postgraduate Program in Animal Science and Pastures. The IFPE campus offers a degree in Electrical Engineering. The municipality also has the Faculty of Management Sciences of Garanhuns (FAGA), the Faculty of Law of Garanhuns (FDG), the Faculty of Exact Sciences of Garanhuns (FACEG), and the Faculty of Applied Social and Human Sciences of Garanhuns (FAHUG).

=== Public safety and crime ===
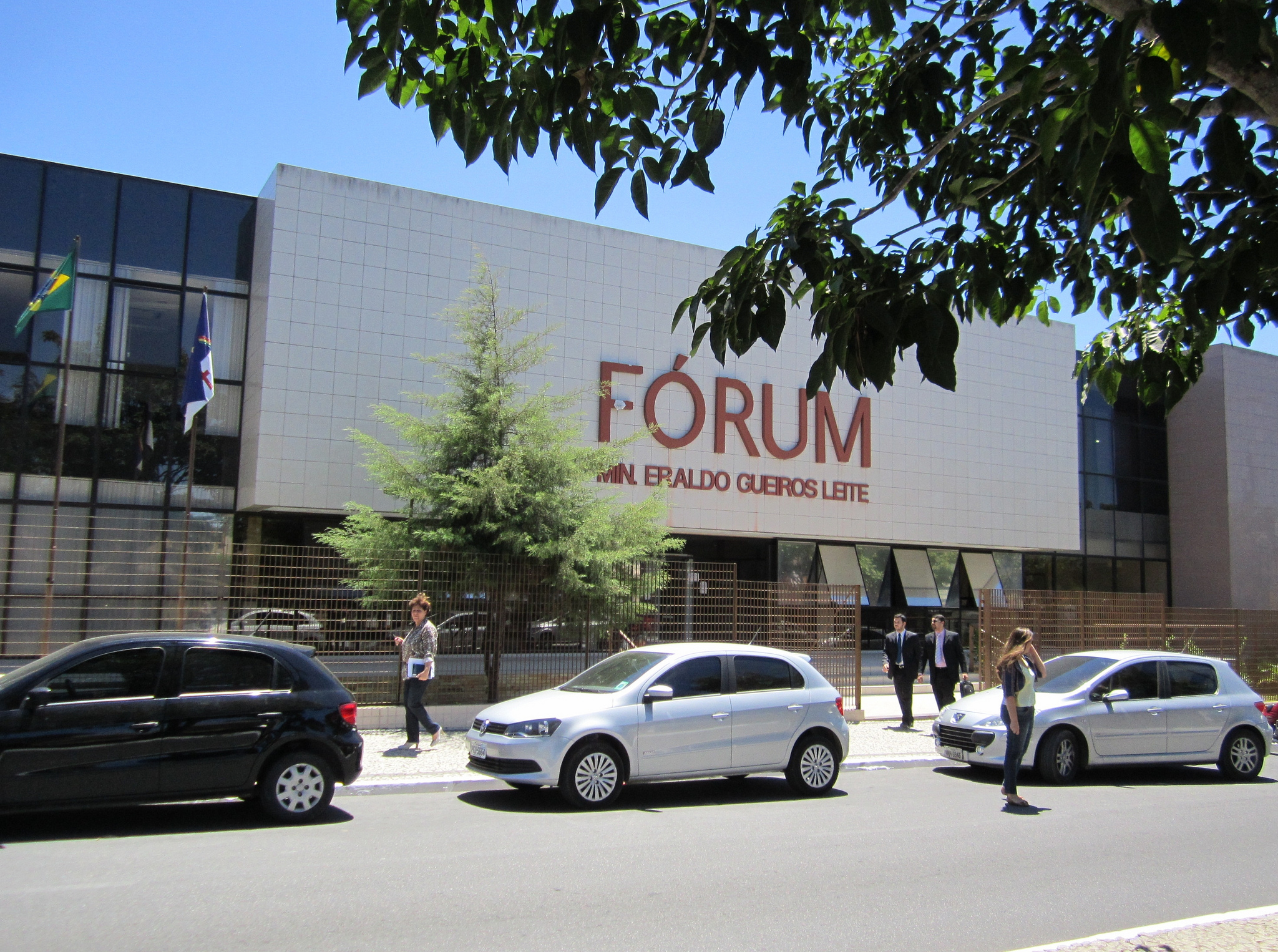
Ministro Eraldo Gueiros Leite Courthouse

As is common across much of Pernambuco, crime rates in Garanhuns are high. In 2012, the rate of Lethal and Intentional Violent Crimes (CVLI) per 100,000 inhabitants was 30.36, ranking Garanhuns 83rd among the most violent municipalities in the state. In 2008, 10 suicides were reported, with a rate of 7.7 suicides per 100,000 inhabitants, placing Garanhuns 618th in the national ranking and 15th in the state ranking. Regarding workplace accidents reported in 2008, approximately 46 cases were recorded, with a rate of 35.3 per hundred thousand inhabitants, ranking 349th nationally and fourth in the state.

The Pact for Life program was established by the Pernambuco State Government in 2007, when the state had one of the highest rates of Lethal and Intentional Violent Crimes (CVLI) per hundred thousand inhabitants in the country. In 2007, the state recorded a CVLI rate of 55.0 per 100,000 inhabitants. Following the creation of the Pact for Life program, which aims to reduce high homicide rates, a set of measures was agreed upon in coordination with society, the Judiciary, the Public Prosecutor's Office, the Legislative Assembly, municipalities, and the federal government to reduce violent deaths.

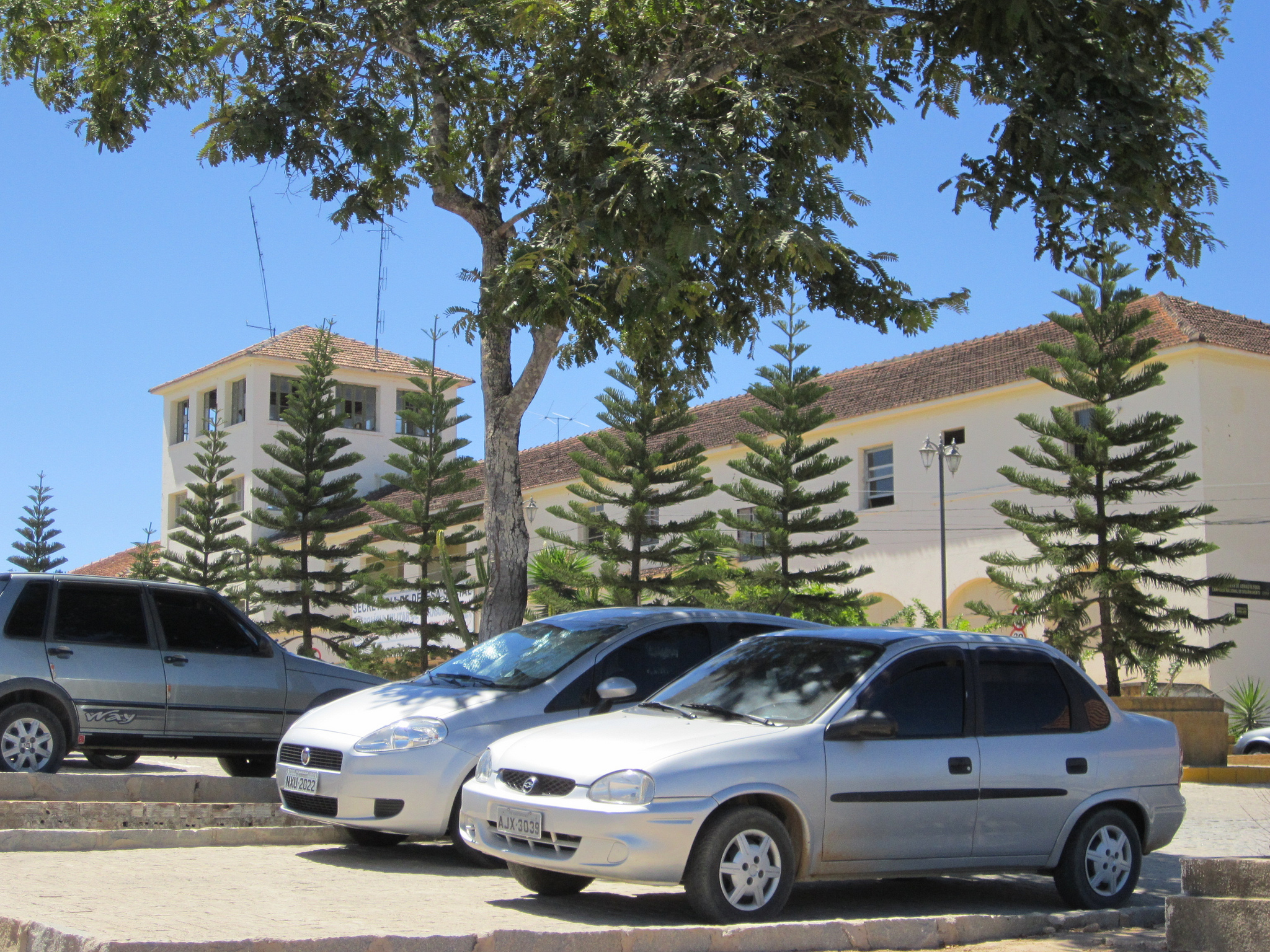
9th Military Police Battalion

In April 2013, the CVLI rate had dropped to 35.0, representing a reduction of 20.0 deaths in the index. In Garanhuns, the homicide rate per hundred thousand inhabitants in 2007 was 13.6, while in the second quarter of 2013, the recorded number was 6.78 homicides.

Inaugurated in 2008, the Garanhuns Public Prison has a capacity for 60 male inmates but operates with approximately 250 prisoners.

In early 2012, Garanhuns gained international notoriety due to a heinous crime committed in the municipality. Professor Jorge Beltrão Negromonte da Silveira, then 50 years old, and Bruna Cristina Oliveira da Silva, 25, were arrested on charges of murdering two women and engaging in cannibalism with the victims' bodies. The case gained notoriety when it was revealed that Isabel Cristina Pires da Silveira, a pastry vendor, had filled her pies with human flesh. The perpetrators became known as "Garanhuns cannibals."

=== Housing, services, and communications ===
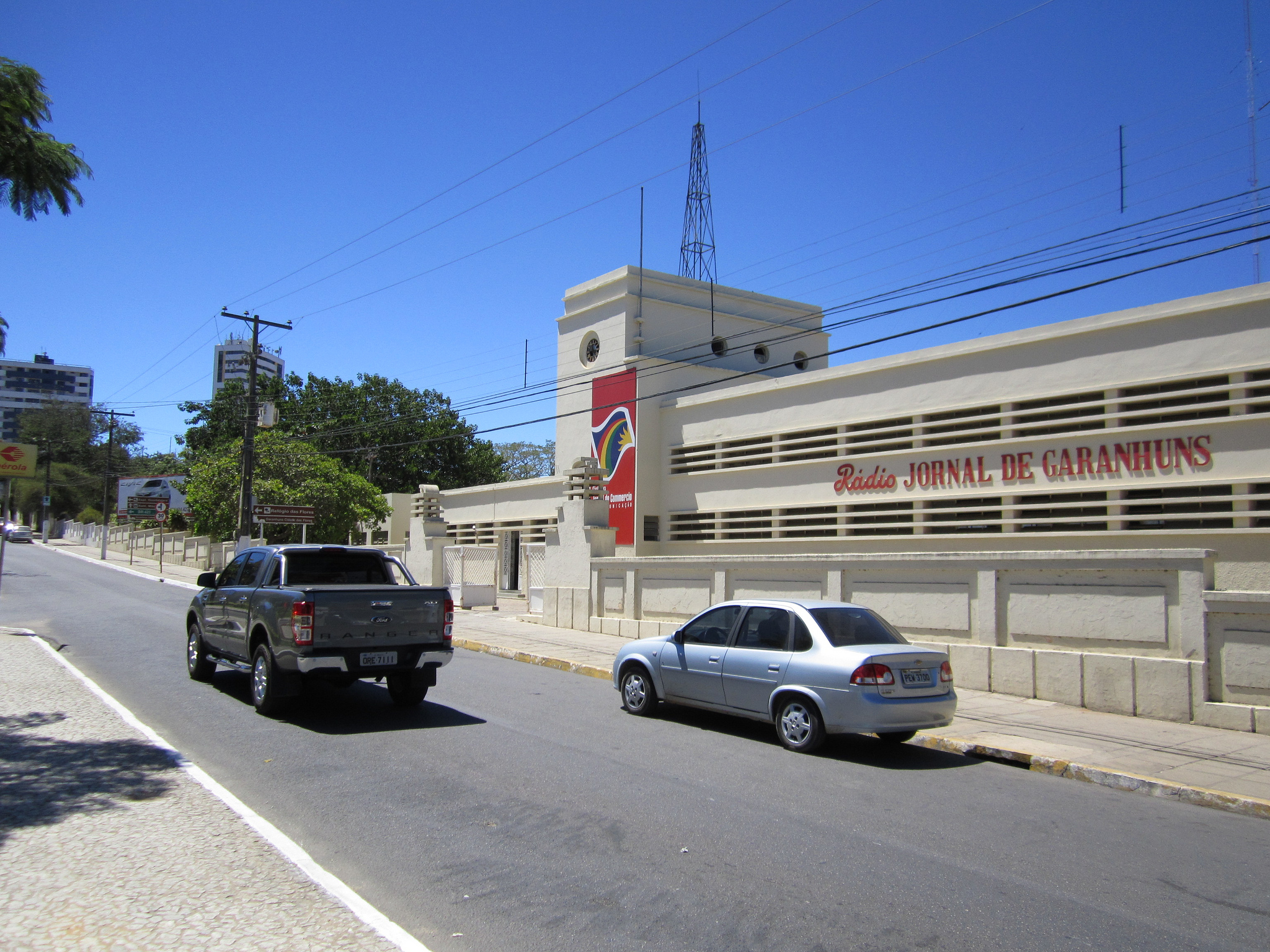
Garanhuns Radio News

According to the Brazilian Institute of Geography and Statistics, in 2010, the municipality had approximately 37,368 permanent private households, comprising 35,291 houses, 1,520 apartments, 425 houses in villages or condominiums, and 62 rooming houses or tenements. Of the total private households, 26,777 were owned, with 25,924 fully paid, 83 in the process of acquisition, and 7,795 rented. 445 households were provided by an employer, 2,255 were provided in other ways, and 96 were occupied in other ways. Most of the municipality has access to treated water, urban cleaning services, sewage treatment, electricity, fixed-line telephony, and mobile telephony. In the same year the survey was conducted, 31,155 residences had access to the general treated water distribution network; 37,153 had access to electricity supplied by the distributor; 33,292 received garbage collection services; and 35,140 households had exclusive-use bathrooms.

The company responsible for potable water distribution and wastewater treatment in Garanhuns and throughout Pernambuco is the Pernambuco Sanitation Company (Compesa). In October 2013, Garanhuns received approximately R$100,000,000 in investments from the Growth Acceleration Program (PAC 2) for the expansion of the sewage collection and treatment system, benefiting over 50,000 people, including the expansion of pumping stations and treatment plants.

The company responsible for supplying electricity to Garanhuns and all 184 municipalities in Pernambuco, as well as the municipality of Pedras de Fogo in Paraíba, is the Pernambuco Energy Company (Celpe). Approximately 99.8 of Garanhuns' households receive electricity supply services. Internet access services, including both dial-up and broadband (ADSL), are offered by various paid and free providers. Mobile and fixed-line telephone services are offered by several operators. The DDD code for Garanhuns is 087, and the postal code ranges from 55290-001 to 55299-999, according to the Correios.

Several channels are available in the VHF and UHF bands, with most broadcasters based in Caruaru (the regional hub). The municipality receives signals from TV Jornal Interior (affiliated with SBT) and TV Asa Branca, affiliated with TV Globo in the Agreste of Pernambuco, which also provides a digital signal. Garanhuns has several daily newspapers in circulation, some of which are among the most traditional in the state, such as Diário de Pernambuco and Jornal do Commercio, in addition to Correio Sete Colinas and Jornal Cidade.

=== Transportation ===
Air transport

The Zumbi dos Palmares International Airport in Maceió, the capital of the neighboring state, is the closest airport to Garanhuns. However, the most commonly used airport for arrivals and departures is the Recife/Guararapes–Gilberto Freyre International Airport, also known as "Guararapes Airport" or "Gilberto Freyre Airport," located in the Imbiribeira neighborhood in the southern zone of Recife, 230 kilometers from central Garanhuns, with BR-232 as the main access route. The Recife airport, serving most municipalities in the eastern part of the state, including the Forest Zone and Agreste regions, boasts the best infrastructure, the longest runway, the largest physical space, and the most advanced technology in the North/Northeast region. Recife's airport is considered the most efficient in Brazil and the second most efficient in South America, behind only the José Joaquín de Olmedo International Airport in Guayaquil, Ecuador's largest city.

Garanhuns also has a regional airport that serves only chartered and small to medium-sized aircraft. The 1,254-meter-long asphalt runway has 16/34 runway headings and an elevation of 863 meters above sea level. In 2012, President Dilma Rousseff announced a package of measures for the aviation sector, with the Northeast region receiving the majority of these funds. The Garanhuns Airport was included, along with most state airports, for investments and the construction of new terminals, though by early 2014, no plans had been finalized.

Rail and metro transport

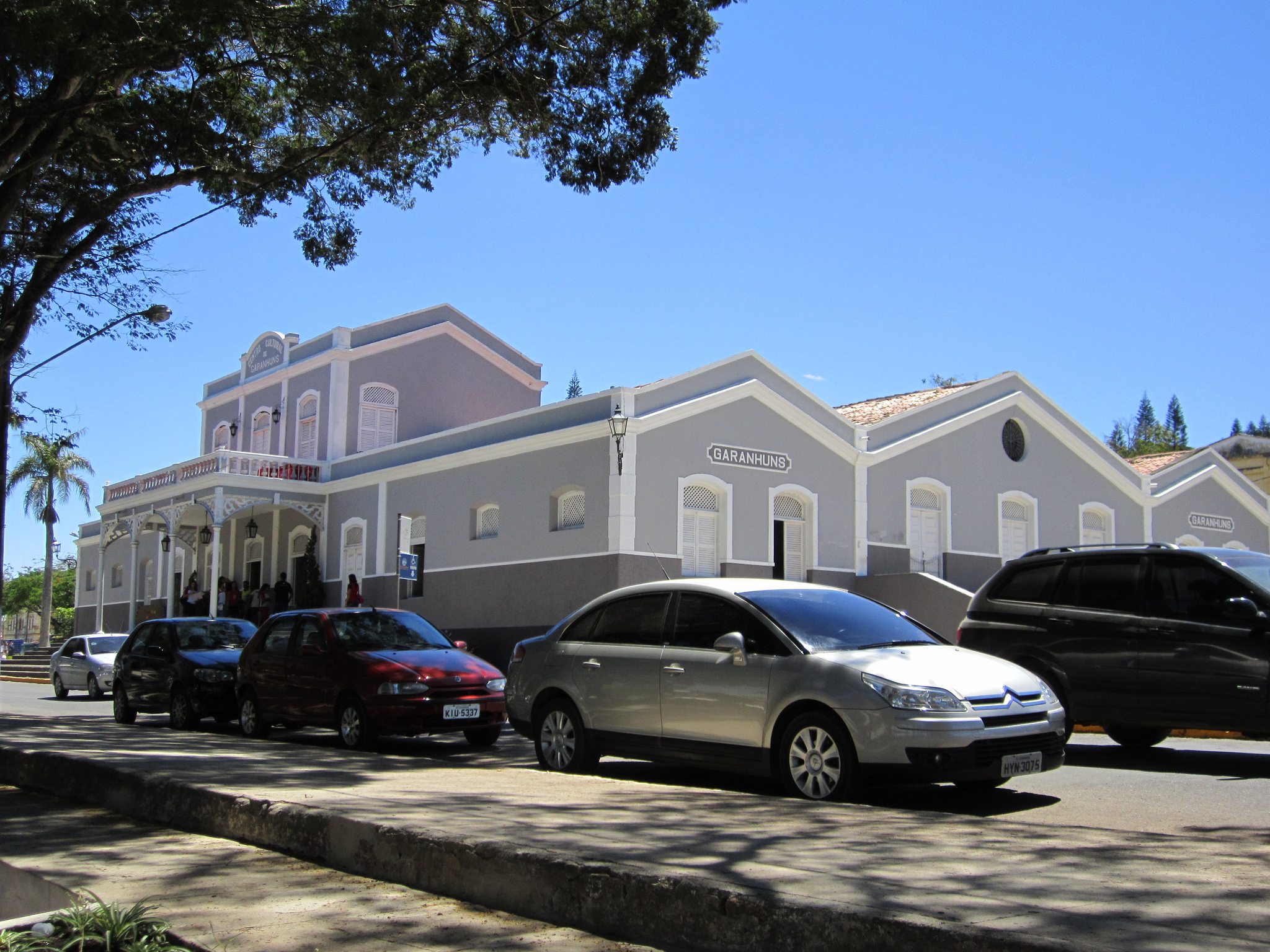
Alfredo Leite Cavalcanti Cultural Center, located between Dom Moura, Tiradentes, and Guadalajara Squares

The Garanhuns railway station was part of the southern trunk line, connecting the city to the state capital. In 1894, after the construction of the Southern Pernambuco State Highway, which linked the Paquevira station to the state of Alagoas, the city's station became a branch line. The line from Recife passed through the municipalities of São João, Angelim, and Canhotinho, the latter receiving a station in 1885, two and a half years before the railway was extended to Garanhuns. The railway and station were inaugurated on September 28, 1887, with a grand celebration in the city, likened to the ancient Olympic Games.

The construction of the railway spurred rapid growth and development in commerce, export companies, and offices. It also increased the number of markets and diversified the products offered. The city's hotel sector received significant investments during this period, as improved access brought more tourists to Garanhuns. The station and railway were decommissioned in 1971, when then-mayor Luiz Souto Dourado announced their transformation into a cultural center. The Alfredo Leite Cavalcanti Cultural Center was inaugurated on March 27, 1971. In 1979, the construction of the Luiz Souto Dourado Theater was announced, which includes several exhibition halls.

Road transport

The Garanhuns passenger bus terminal is located in the Heliópolis neighborhood and is adapted to accommodate people with disabilities and/or reduced mobility. Its basic structure includes male and female restrooms, located near the luggage storage and ticket sales area. It also has a 24-hour taxi stand and four public telephones near the restrooms. The main bus companies operating there are Cruzeiro, Guanabara, Itapemirim, Gontijo, and Progresso.

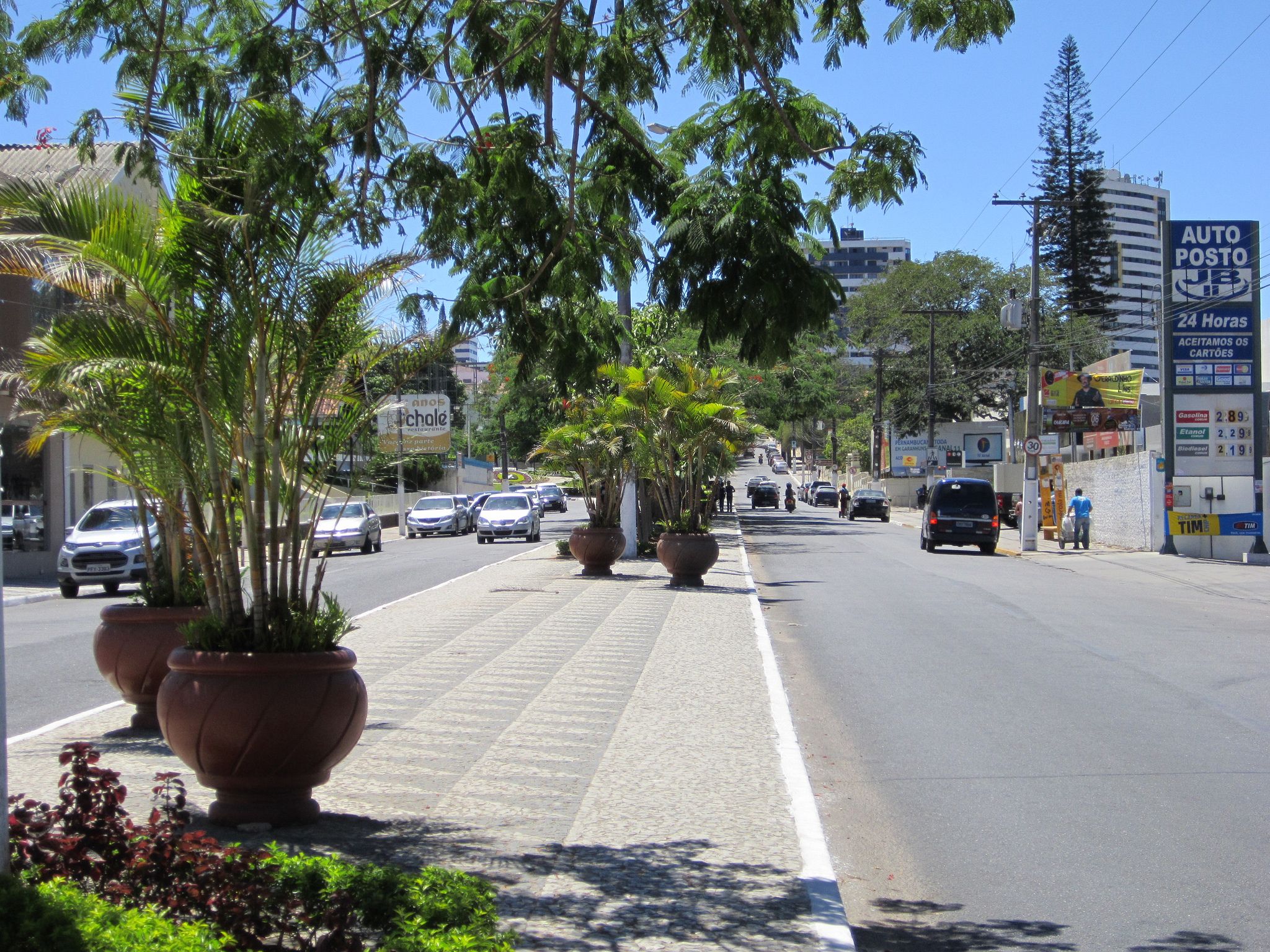
In Garanhuns, twenty streets and avenues had LED lighting by early 2014.

Garanhuns is well-positioned in terms of road infrastructure, connecting the municipality to neighboring cities and the state capital, as well as other cities and capitals in the Northeast. Its main connections are via BR-424, PE-177, and BR-423. The first begins in Arcoverde (in the backlands of Pernambuco) and ends in the Metropolitan Region of Maceió in Alagoas (with a section still planned by DNIT). The second, PE-177, starts in Garanhuns and ends in Quipapá (in the forest region of Pernambuco). The most significant access, BR-423, begins in Caruaru (BR-232), São Caetano, and crosses the entire Garanhuns Microregion, ending in Paulo Afonso, Bahia, with plans to extend the highway to Juazeiro in Bahia's backlands. In late 2013, it was announced that a call for bids for the widening of 80 kilometers between the municipalities of São Caetano and Garanhuns would be published in July 2014. The project was scheduled for completion in June 2016.

Urban transport

The Municipal Traffic and Transport Authority (AMTT) is the municipal agency responsible for planning, regulating, controlling, and overseeing traffic, as well as organizing, executing, supervising, evaluating, and managing public transportation services, citizen and municipal property safety, social defense actions, and permanent civil defense measures against natural, anthropogenic, and mixed disasters. The city has several companies responsible for urban transportation, connecting the outskirts to the city center. Two of the main companies providing this service are Viação Padre Cícero and Coletivo São Cristóvão. According to IBGE data, in 2012, the municipality's vehicle fleet consisted of 38,034 vehicles, including 18,494 cars, 1,698 trucks, 340 tractor trucks, 2,588 pickups, 646 vans, 244 minibuses, 11,067 motorcycles, 1,758 scooters, 104 buses, no wheeled tractors, and 957 other types of vehicles.

== Culture ==
The Garanhuns Municipal Culture Secretariat oversees the city's cultural sector and is responsible for planning and implementing cultural policies in all areas. The Secretariat's primary goal is to support, preserve, and promote the elements that comprise the city's cultural identity, while also encouraging tourism through the events it organizes. The Municipal Tourism Secretariat establishes guidelines for tourism-driven economic development. It plans, organizes, and executes tourism-related activities in collaboration with other secretariats and public and private institutions.

=== Notable figures ===
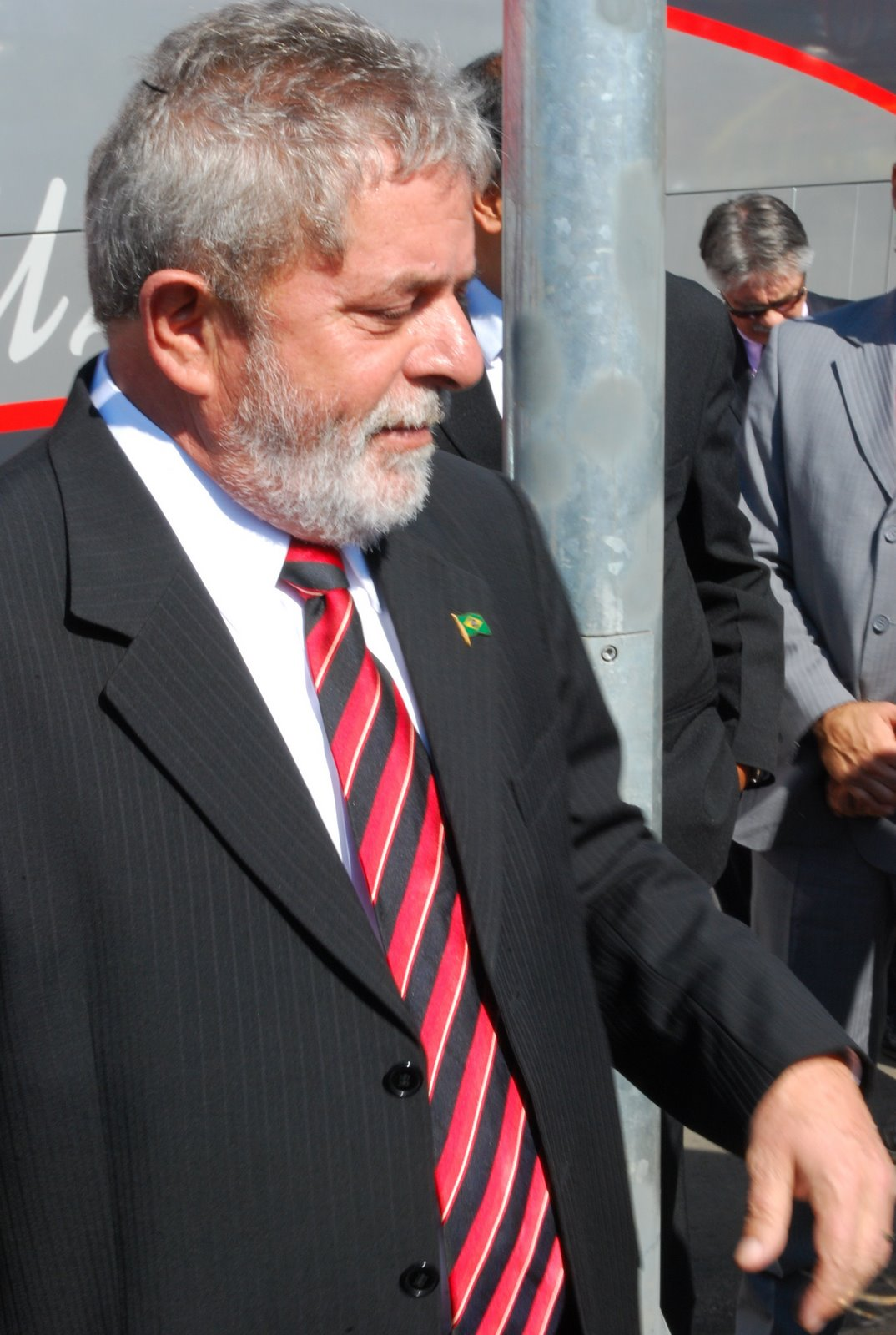
Luiz Inácio Lula da Silva, current president of Brazil, was born in Garanhuns, in an area now part of Caetés.

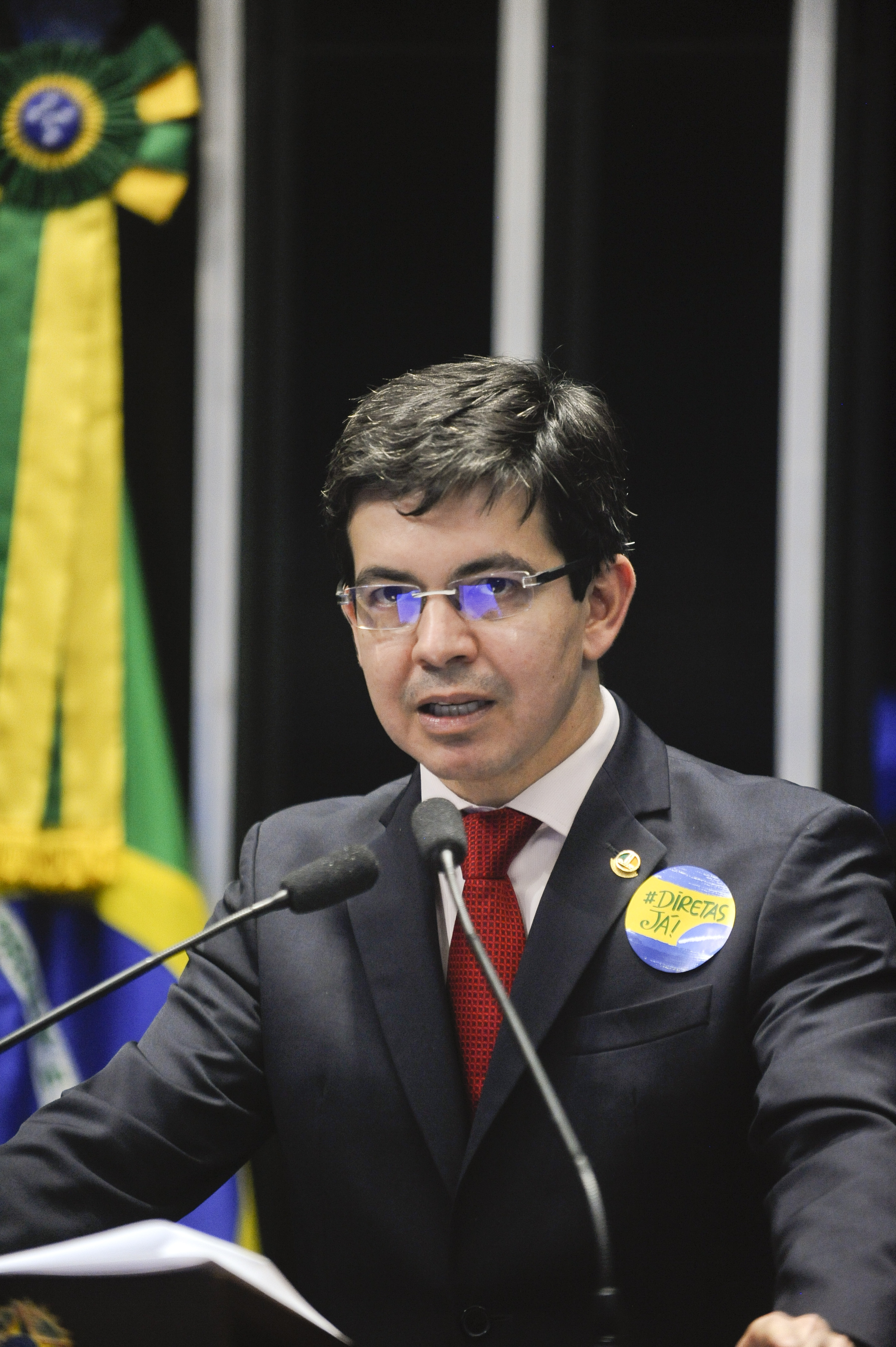
Senator Randolfe Rodrigues was born in Garanhuns and moved to Amapá at the age of eight.

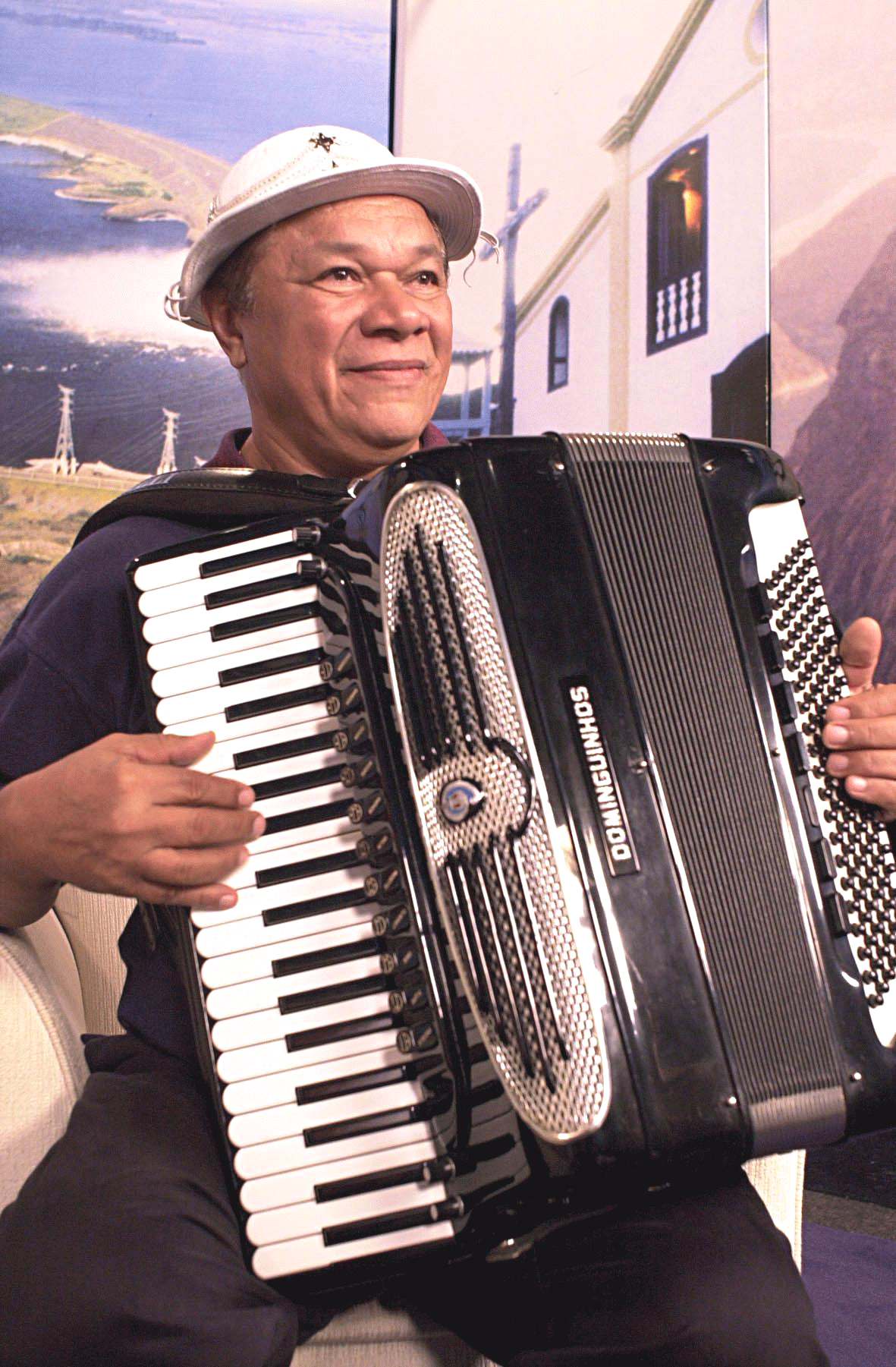
Dominguinhos, one of Garanhuns' most illustrious natives.

Garanhuns has been the birthplace of many artists and figures who have made significant contributions to art, architecture, theater, literature, music, and politics. Notable names include writer Luís Jardim; musician Toinho Alves; architect Janete Costa, renowned for her contributions to interior architecture, exhibition design, product design, and promotion of popular art and regional crafts; accordionist Dominguinhos; journalist and former deputy Cristina Tavares; Monsignor Adelmar; engineer Ruber van der Linden, known for developing and implementing Garanhuns' Light and Water Supply Plan and honored with a namesake park; and actress Lívia Falcão, recognized for her work in theater, TV Globo soap operas, and successful Brazilian films. Luiz Inácio Lula da Silva, president of Brazil, was born in Garanhuns, in the then-district of Caetés, which became a separate municipality 18 years after his birth.

Among Garanhuns' most illustrious natives is singer, composer, and instrumentalist José Domingos de Morais, popularly known as Dominguinhos, who began his career at the age of six, playing the pandeiro alongside his brothers Moraes (on accordion) and Valdomiro (on zabumba) in the trio "Três Pinguins." The trio performed at markets and hotel entrances until, in 1948, singer Luiz Gonzaga saw one of their performances and promised Dominguinhos an accordion if he ever moved to Rio de Janeiro. In 1954, his family relocated to Rio, where Dominguinhos sought out Gonzaga to fulfill his promise. With the gifted accordion, he formed the Trio Nordestino, performing at circuses and dance events in Rio's interior cities. His success led to collaborations with Gonzaga in shows and recordings, marking the peak of his artistic career. His songs have been performed by renowned Brazilian artists such as Maria Bethânia, Gal Costa, Caetano Veloso, Elba Ramalho, Raimundo Fagner, and others. He also collaborated with artists such as Nando Cordel, Gilberto Gil, and Chico Buarque.

=== Performing arts and events ===
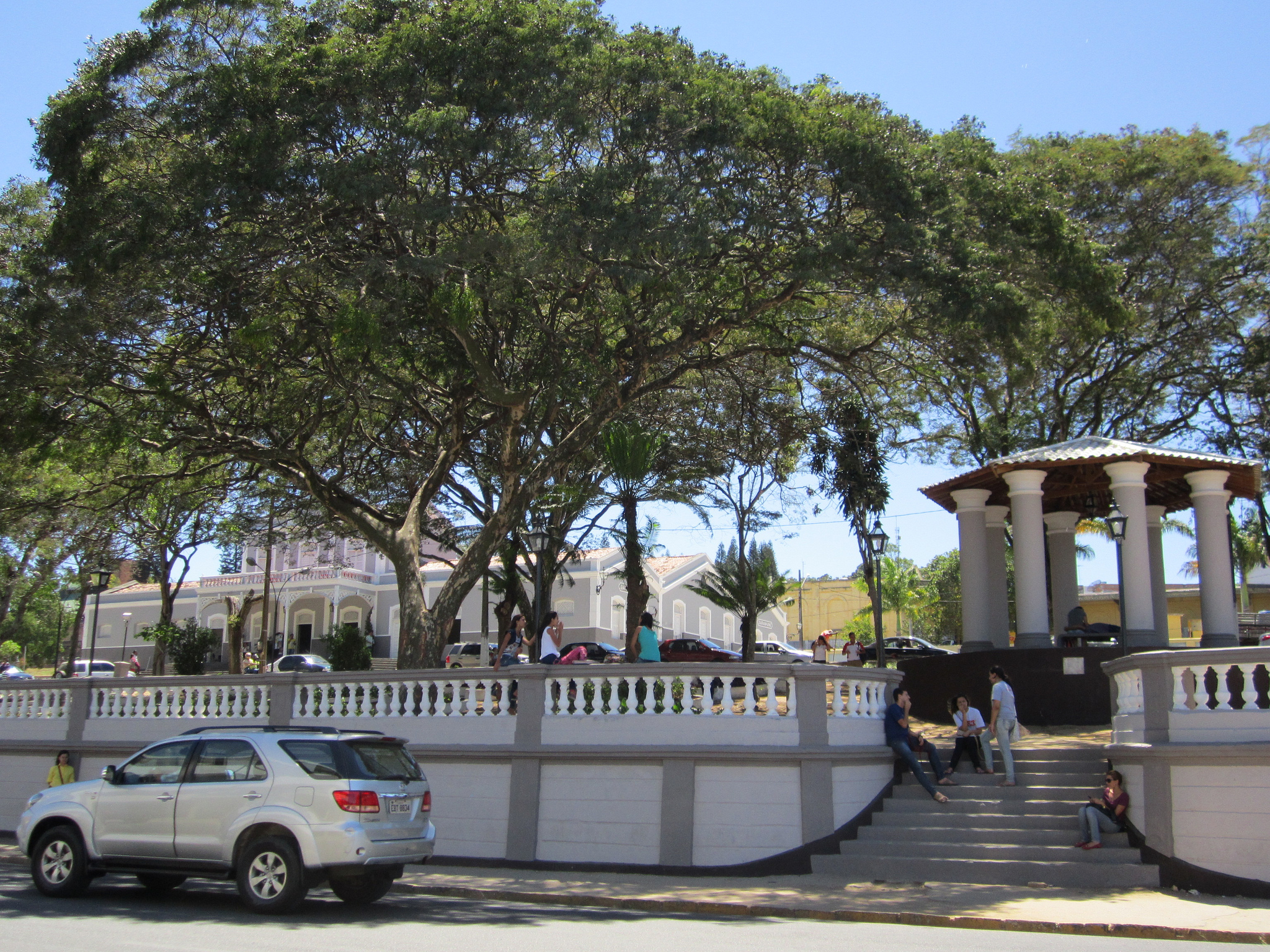
Dom Moura Square

The city has few spaces dedicated to the performing arts, with the Luiz Souto Dourado Theater, located in the Alfredo Leite Cultural Center, being the largest and oldest venue. However, other spaces serve as stages for artistic events organized by public and philanthropic entities, such as the Colunata Space, Luiz Jardim Space, SESC Garanhuns Activity Center, and various squares and parks throughout the city.

Annually, the Social Service of Commerce (SESC) holds the SESC Performing Arts Festival in Garanhuns, featuring a variety of dance, theater, video-dance, performances, and educational activities. The fourth edition in 2013 was marked by the decentralization of cultural hubs, extending to other municipalities in the southern Agreste of Pernambuco, such as Saloá, Jupi, and Canhotinho. Performances also take place during the Garanhuns Winter Festival.

Since 2004, the Garanhuns Jazz Festival has been held annually, created as an alternative for tourists seeking to spend the carnival period in the Agreste of Pernambuco. The festival features performances by Pernambuco and Brazilian musicians, as well as international bands and artists. In its 7th edition, the event attracted approximately 30,000 people to the city, generating around R$2.5 million for the local economy. It is estimated to create over 800 direct jobs and 500 indirect jobs, boosting the city's hotel network, which consists of 22 establishments and reaches up to 100% occupancy during this period.

=== Attractions ===
Garanhuns Winter Festival

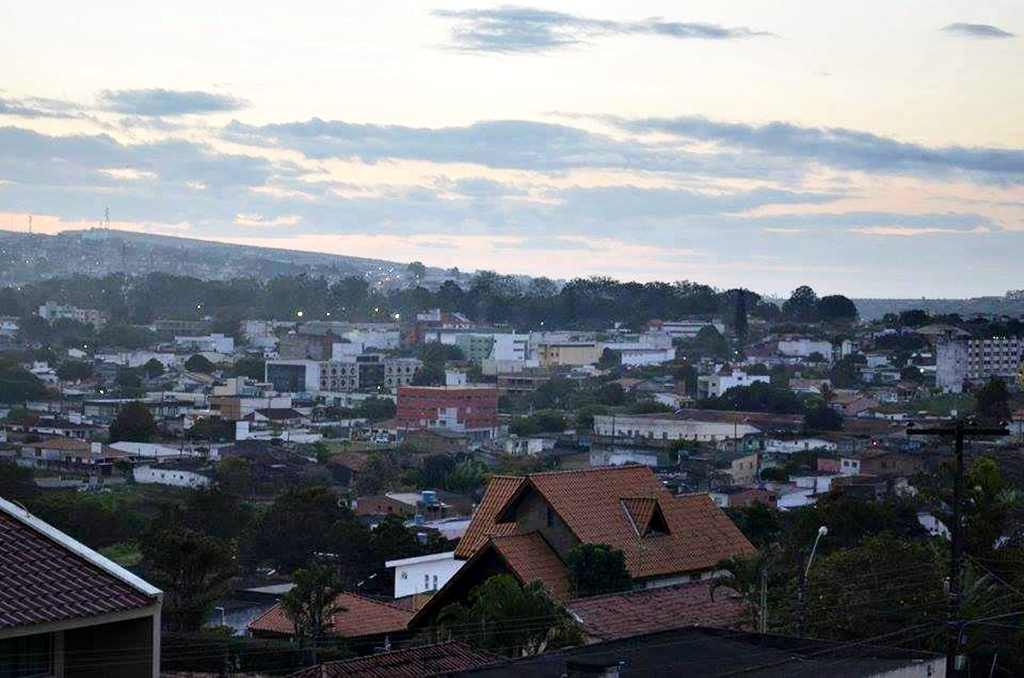
Partial view of Garanhuns

The Garanhuns Winter Festival is the main event held in the municipality and the largest arts and culture festival in Pernambuco, attracting over 500,000 visitors annually and ranking as the second most important winter attraction in Pernambuco, after Caruaru's June festivals. Held from July 17 to 26 since 1990, the festival brings together music, cinema, performing arts, popular culture, and other forms of expression, boosting Garanhuns' hotel sector. It offers tourists everything from major concerts to processions of Pernambuco and Brazilian popular culture, from theatrical performances to poetry recitals at open markets, encompassing a wide range of cultural diversity. In addition to promoting culture, the festival implements various diffusion and cultural training initiatives. These initiatives solidify the festival's role as the culmination of public policies developed by the Pernambuco government. The festival is organized by the Culture Secretariat, Fundarpe, and other supporting institutions.

The city's seventeen cultural hubs attract thousands of tourists, who come to see renowned artists and emerging talents. One of the city's main squares, Mestre Dominguinhos Square (Guadalajara Esplanade), serves as a stage for widely followed artists across Brazil, featuring performers such as Vanessa da Mata, Luiz Caldas, Zé Ramalho, Fábio Júnior, Alceu Valença, Angela Maria, Otto, Marcelo Jeneci, and bands such as Titãs and Nação Zumbi. The daytime program offers visitors circus performances, literary showcases, cinema and photography exhibits, popular art presentations, craft exhibitions, visual arts, design, and fashion, as well as workshops and cultural debates.

Garanhuns Jazz Festival

Created in 2007, the Garanhuns Jazz Festival (FJG) emerged as an alternative during the carnival period. Held concurrently with traditional street block celebrations in cities such as Recife and Olinda, the event offers visitors various shows on decentralized stages, musical workshops, and classes, providing comfort and flexible schedules. During the festival, approximately 30,000 visitors come to the city, injecting around R$2.5 million into the local economy. It is estimated to generate about 800 direct and 500 indirect jobs.

Garanhuns' hotel network, consisting of 22 establishments including hotels and guesthouses, reaches up to 100% occupancy during the event. In addition to the hotel network, the Association of Parents and Friends of the Exceptional (APAE) offers low-cost hostel-style accommodations. The festival's infrastructure is designed to ensure spectator comfort and safety. The show areas feature covered seating, special lighting, and free tables and chairs. There are also mini food courts comprising the city's busiest bars and restaurants.

The FJG is considered one of the largest jazz and blues festivals in Brazil, earning praise from bands and critics worldwide. In 2008 and 2009, the festival was a pioneer, winning the II Mestre Salustiano Award, granted by the Pernambuco government to notable initiatives that promote tourism in the state's municipalities.

Viva Dominguinhos Festival

Created in 2014, the Viva Dominguinhos Festival is typically held at the end of April each year, sometimes extending into early May, always from Thursday to Saturday. The event honors singer and composer Dominguinhos, who was born and buried in Garanhuns, and features performances by national and local artists. It is organized in partnership between the Tourism and Culture Secretariat and the Garanhuns Municipal Government. The event includes major Brazilian Popular Music artists performing at the Mestre Dominguinhos Square Stage, as well as shows and accordion circles at the Colunata Space, along with workshops. The estimated attendance for Friday and Saturday nights is 60,000 people. It is another major attraction in the city.

Architecture and monuments

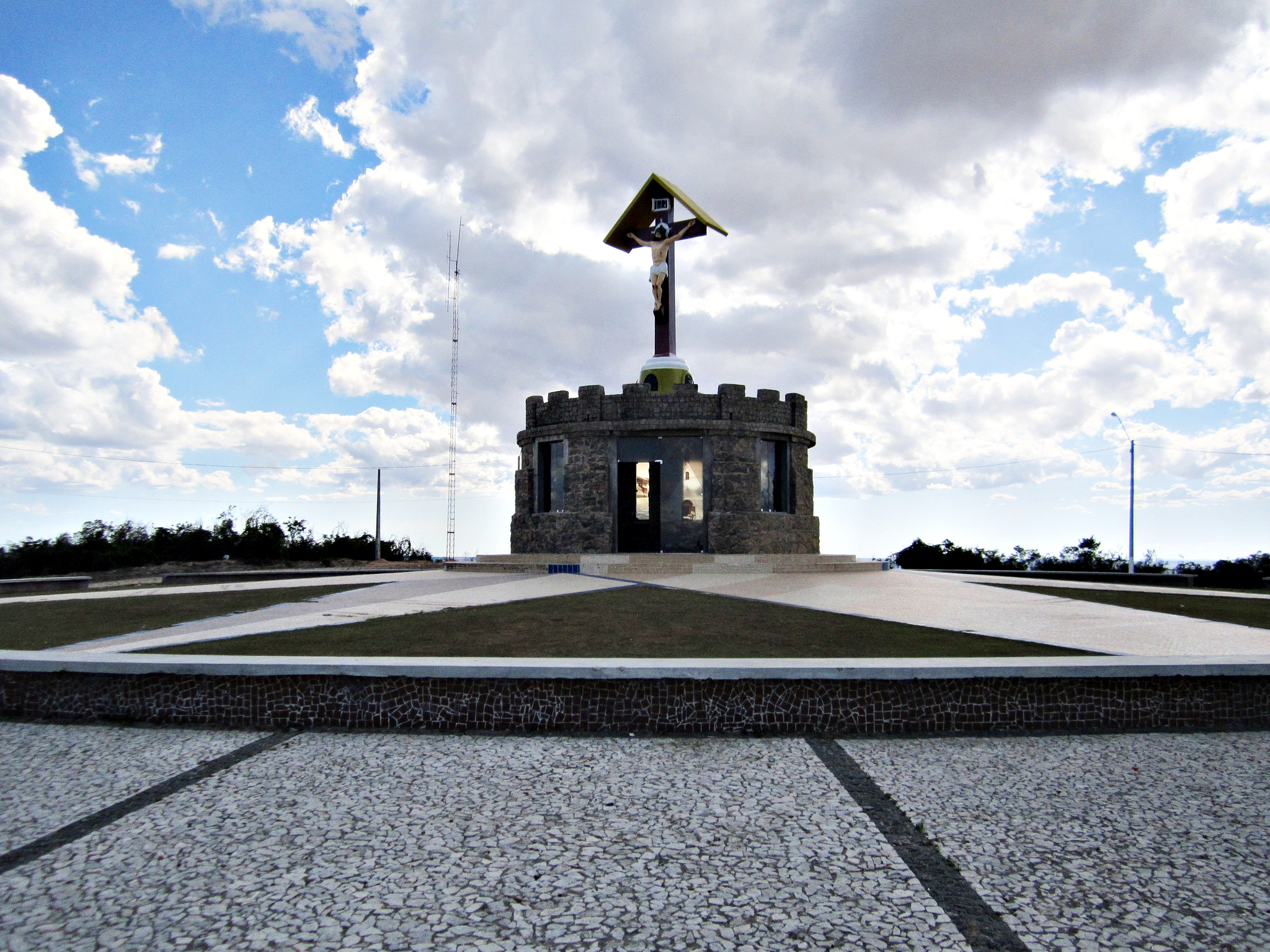
Christ of Magano

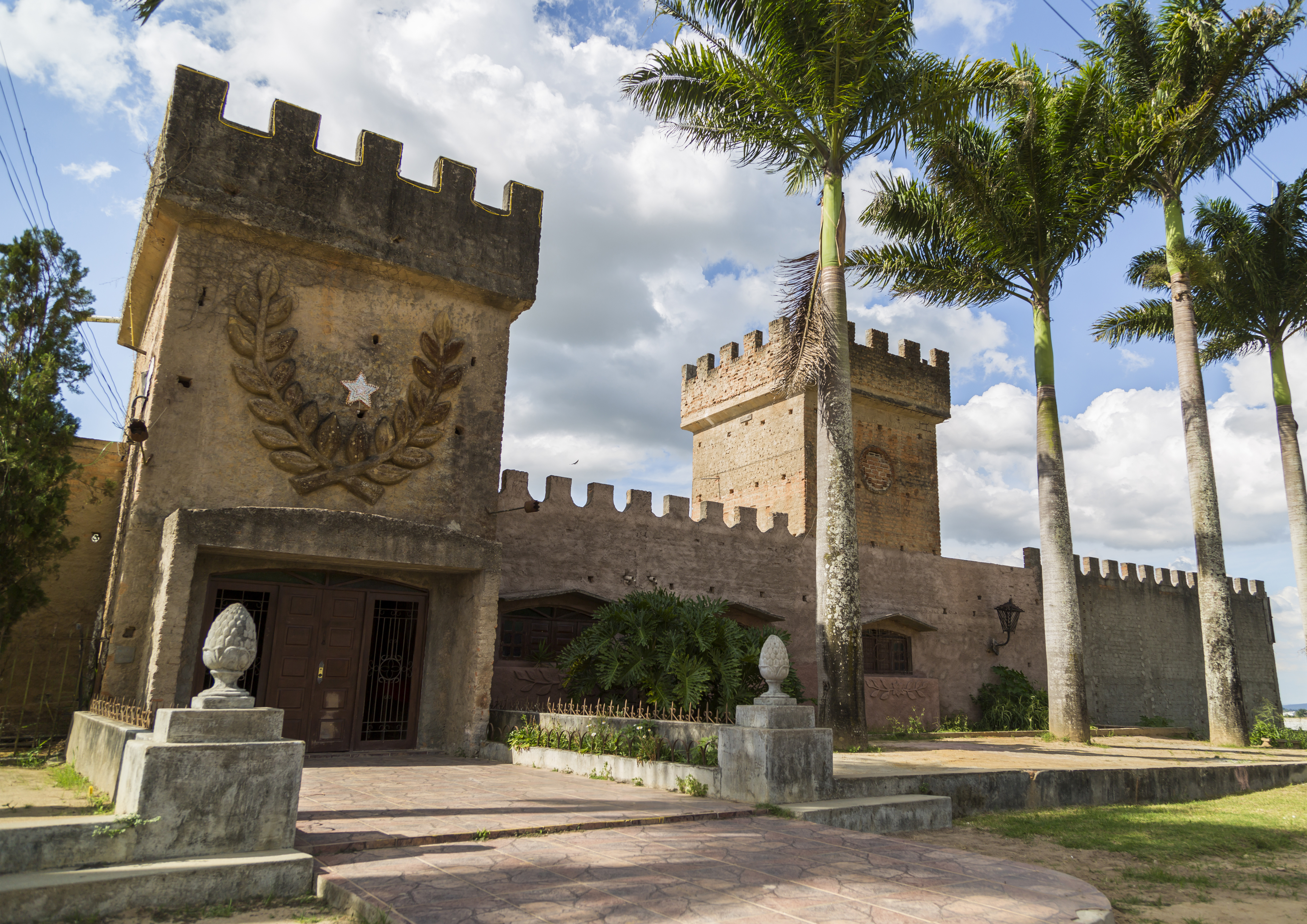
João Capão Castle

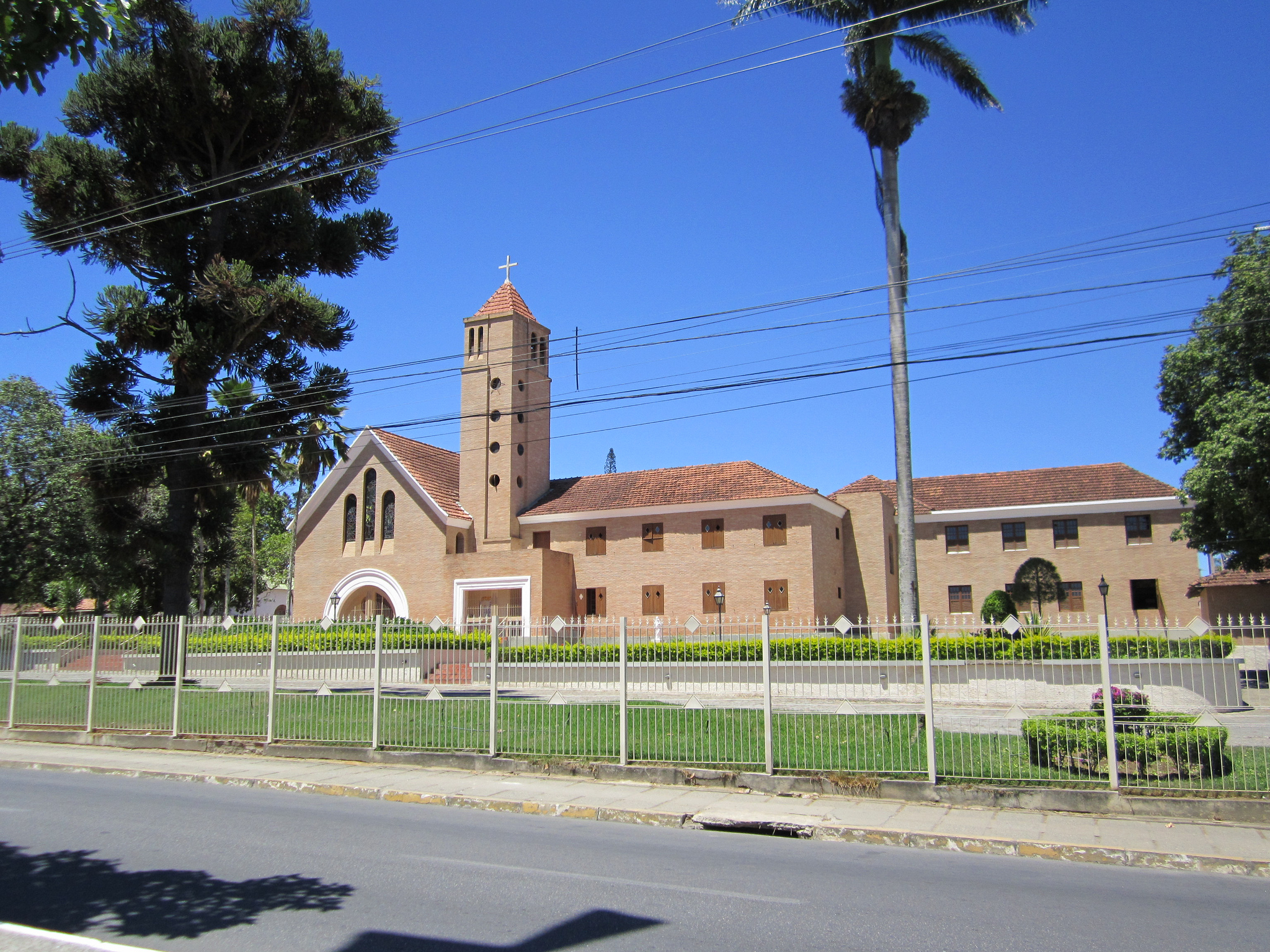
São José Seminary

Garanhuns is an important destination for religious tourists, featuring Christian sculptures and churches with rich architectural details. A notable example is the replica of the Stations of the Cross, built at Alto do Columinho, consisting of 15 illustrated stations along a path leading to a sanctuary formed by two perpendicular walls with an image of the crucified Jesus Christ at the center. From this elevated site, visitors can enjoy a panoramic view of the city. Among the seven hills surrounding Garanhuns is the Christ of Magano, a sculpture depicting the crucifixion of Christ, built by Renato Pantaleão in 1954. Situated at the highest point of the municipality, at an elevation of 1,030 metres above sea level, it is considered to be the highest Christian image in Brazil in relation to sea level.

Construction of the Nossa Senhora do Perpétuo Socorro Church began in 1957 and was completed on December 8, 1962, with its architectural design crafted by engineers Albert Reithler and Pierre Reithler, supported by thousands of anonymous Garanhuns residents who donated construction materials and labor. The church's design was further refined after its completion. Located in the city center, the São José Seminary currently serves as a residence for seminarians of the Diocesan Congregation. Built in 1926 with rich architectural features, the seminary strictly adheres to its scheduled masses. Also in the city center is the São Bento Monastery, constructed in the style of ancient Benedictine monasteries, featuring notable elements such as stained-glass windows and a panel depicting the Apocalypse. The monastery also houses a factory producing communion wafers and artisanal products.

Begun in 1914, the Schoenstatt Apostolic Movement was founded by young Christians during World War I. Men, women, youths, couples, and priests joined the movement, united by the goal of contributing to the religious and moral renewal of the world. In 2002, the Mãe Rainha Sanctuary was built in Garanhuns and completed in 2004. It is a popular destination for religious visitors worldwide and is managed by the Schoenstatt Sisters of Mary. Another notable structure is the João Capão Castle, built to fulfill its owner's childhood dream.

== Sports ==
Garanhuns holds the second-highest sporting significance in the Pernambuco Agreste, behind only Caruaru. Despite having few football clubs, notable ones include the Associação Garanhuense de Atletismo (AGA) and the Sete de Setembro Esporte Clube, which competed in and won a title in the Campeonato Pernambucano Série A2 in 1995.

The Marco Antônio Maciel Stadium, also known as "The Giant of the Agreste," is the municipality's main and largest sports venue, named in honor of Senator Marco Maciel, who served as a state and federal deputy, governor of Pernambuco, and vice-president of Brazil during both terms of Fernando Henrique Cardoso. The stadium gained national recognition in 2003 when it hosted a Série B match between Sport and Palmeiras. Located in the Indiano neighborhood, the stadium can accommodate 7,000 people, with 1,500 covered reserved seats.

Every year, TV Asa Branca, a Rede Globo affiliate in the region, and its partners organize the TV Asa Branca Futsal Cup. The SESC gymnasium, near the Sulanca Fair grounds in Caruaru, hosts matches involving futsal teams from key cities in the Forest Zone, Agreste, and the backlands, such as Palmares, Catende, Bezerros, Santa Cruz do Capibaribe, Belo Jardim, Caruaru, Lajedo, Arcoverde, and Serra Talhada.

== Holidays ==
In Garanhuns, there are four municipal holidays, as per Law Project No. 41/2013 by Mayor Izaías Régis, which abolished the municipal emancipation day, previously celebrated on March 10, and established "Garanhuns Day," observed on the second Sunday of March. Additionally, there are eight national holidays, one state holiday, and several optional holidays. The municipal holidays are Good Friday in April; the day of the patron saint Saint Anthony, on June 13; the day of Saint John, on June 24; and Corpus Christi. "Garanhuns Day" is celebrated on the second Sunday of March, replacing the emancipation date. On March 2, the State Holiday of Pernambuco is observed optionally, commemorating the separatist movement of the Pernambucan revolt of 1817.

== See also ==
- Diocese of Garanhuns
- Garanhuns Airport
- Sete de Setembro Esporte Clube
- Mundaú River
- Garanhuns cannibals
