= Capibaribe =

Capibaribe may refer to:

- Capibaribe River, a river located in Brazilian state of Pernambuco
- Clube Náutico Capibaribe, a Brazilian sports team
- Santa Cruz do Capibaribe, a municipality located in Brazilian state of Pernambuco
