= Luiz Gonzaga Pereira dos Santos =

Brazilian mass murderer

- Santos (center) on an undated photo.
- Died: 3 March 1981; Poção, Pernambuco, Brazil
- Cause of death: Shot dead
- Occupation: Farmer
- Motive: Revenge

Details
- Date: June 29, 1979; 6:30 p.m.
- Locations: Princesa Isabel, Brazil
- Target: José Alves de Almeida family
- Killed: 7
- Weapon: Revolver

Luiz Gonzaga Pereira dos Santos (died 3 March 1981), also known as Gonzaga Cacimba, was a Brazilian mass murderer who killed a family of seven in Princesa Isabel, Brazil, on June 29, 1979. He was killed on a siege on March 3, 1981.

== Background ==
Santos was enraged because his daughter had lost her virginity to one of the José Alves de Almeida family's sons, João Alves de Almeida. João wanted to marry Santos's daughter, but the daughter had fallen in love with another man, and the engagement was undone.

Santos was described as a bad character, who lived with a group of rogues, and was interested in gambling. He was also credited with four other murders and other crimes in the states of Pernambuco and Paraíba.

Santos was said to have a strong hatred for the Almeida family, having a quarrel with them for over five years, and had always said that he was going to have revenge.

== Murders ==
On approximately 6:30 p.m., June 29, 1979, Santos, armed with a revolver, entered de Almeida house in Princesa Isabel. The family was dining at the time. After he intruded Almeida's house, he ordered the family to lean against the wall, and then began shooting them, all of them fatally. Santos also searched for João, who had seduced his daughter, but was not in the house at the time. Santos then fled.

One child, Francisco de Assis de Almeida Santos, 13, hid behind a door, sneaked past Santos, and escaped, ran towards to the house of Aluisio Ferreira da Silva that was 500 meters away. Ferreira da Silva went to the house to inquire the shooting and was threatened by Santos, who ordered Ferreira da Silva to get out of the house, saying "se ficar na minha frente, morre também" (If you keep standing in front of me, you die too.).

Assis de Almeida then fled with Ferreira da Silva, who called the police. On 9:15 p.m. 60 police officers, commanded by Colonel Mauricio Leite and by local delegate Adelino Ferreira da Silva, began searching for Santos, with no success.

The victims were buried on Triunfo's Cemetery on 10:30 a.m. An employee of a bank establishment requested donations for buying coffins for the victims, in which was received by the population.

An extensive search for Santos was initiated, which finally ended on March 3, 1981.

Worried because Santos was being searched for by 23,450 furious villagers, Judge Luiz Carlos Santos, who accumulated the district of Princesa Isabel, contacted Paraiba Public Security to give Santos the "guarantees of justice" fearing that Santos might be found and lynched by the population of the region, who were furious about the crime.

== Siege and death ==
On Poção, Pernambuco, March 3, 1981, Santos's house was surrounded by the 3rd Military Police Squad of Pernambuco and Paraíba state authorities, Santos resisted and began a shootout with the police, claiming that he had a child with him, and that he was not a violent criminal, that would not take his life, because he committed several crimes on regions of Pernambuco and Paraíba and had a preventive detention mandate, and for that reason, he wanted to leave the house dead.

He released one of his 25-year-old sons, whom he demanded to close the entire house, and said "agora estou pronto, nunca me entregarei vivo." (Now I'm ready; I won't surrender alive.) For approximately 11 hours, Santos opened one of his house windows, and said he would only leave with Captain Medeiros, who approached Santos, Medeiros tried to convince the gunman to surrender to the police, Santos responded "não havia jeito" (There's no way.) and that in no way he would surrender.

Learning that the gunman would not surrender with his life, Captain Medeiros ordered the Military Police Squad of Pernambuco in Garanhuns to tear gas bombs, at 14 o'clock, they requested again for Santos to surrender, but was again unsuccessful. According to seargeant João Gomes de Souza, it was finally resolved to thrown tear gas bombs onto Santos house, Santos responded the police and jumped the window of the house and began shooting at João Gomes de Souza, injuring him. This response caused the police to shoot at Santos, killing him with 20 bullets, but he couldn't be treated from his injuries.

== Aftermath ==
After the shootout, Santos was taken to Monteiro, Paraíba municipality, while Gomes de Souza was taken to the Hospital de Arcoverde, posteriorly to the Centro Hospitalar da Polícia Militar de Pernambuco, on Derby, Recife.

For killing seven persons, Santos gained notoriety with the name "Mata-Sete" (Kill-Seven) or "Monstro de Princesa" (Princesa's Monster) given by the newspaper O Norte.

A book, based on the murders of Santos, "Mata Sete" o monstro de Sertão o assassino de um família em Princesa Isabel, written by Antonio Patricio de Souza, was published in 1979.

== Victims ==
- José Alves de Almeida, 56
- Marcionila Alves de Almeida, 56, José Alves's wife
- Maria da Gloria, 18
- Maria de Fatima, 17
- Maria Aparecida, 12
- Francisco de Assis, 10
- Vital José Alves de Almeida, 7

== Bibliography ==
- de Souza, Antonio Patricio: "Mata Sete" o monstro de Sertão o assassino de um familia em Princesa Isabel; 1979.
