= Brejo da Madre de Deus =

City in Pernambuco, Brazil

- Municipality of Pernambuco, Brazil
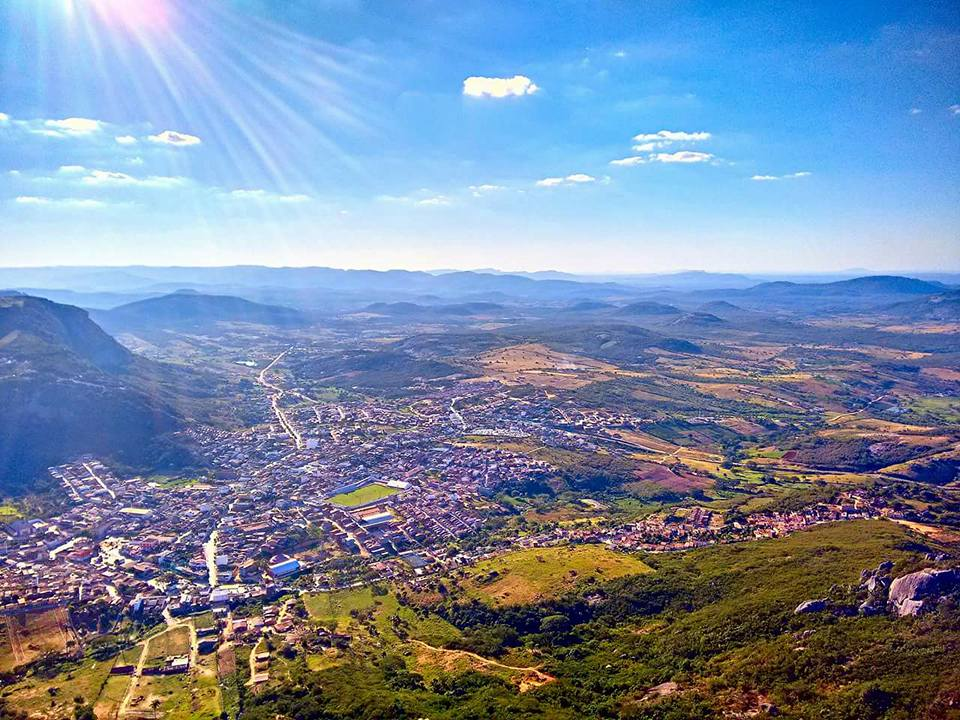
- Aerial view of Brejo da Madre de Deus

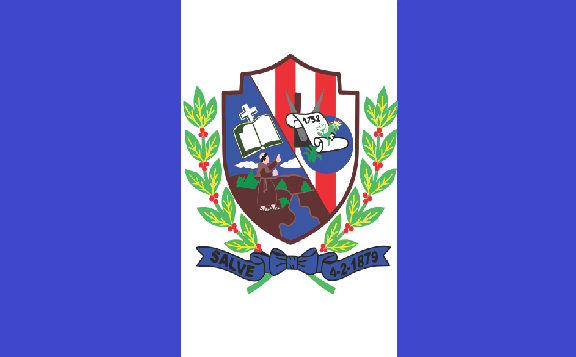
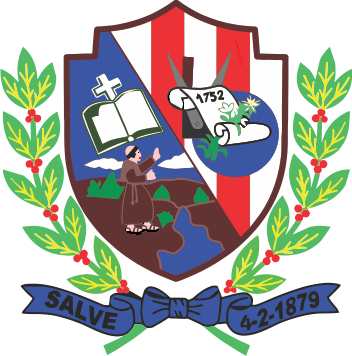
- Flag Coat of arms

- Location of Brejo da Madre de Deus in Pernambuco

- Location within Brazil Location within South America
- Coordinates: 8°8′45″S 36°22′15″W
- Country: Brazil
- Region: Northeast
- State: Pernambuco
- Founded: 4 February 1879

Government
  - Mayor: Roberto Abraham Abrahamian Asfora (PP) (2025-2028)
  - Vice Mayor: Rubieno Marques de Melo (PSDB) (2025-2028)

Area
  - Total: 761.824 km^{2} (294.142 sq mi)
- Elevation: 636 m (2,087 ft)

Population (2022 Census)
  - Total: 48,648
  - Estimate (2025): 51,308
  - Density: 63.81/km^{2} (165.3/sq mi)
- Demonym: Brejense (Brazilian Portuguese)
- Time zone: UTC-03:00 (Brasília Time)
- Postal code: 55170-000, 55171-000, 55172-000, 55173-000, 55174-000, 55175-000, 55178-000
- HDI (2010): 0.562 – medium
- Website: brejomdeus.pe.gov.br

Brejo da Madre de Deus (Central northeastern portuguese pronunciation: [ˈbɾɛʒu ˈdɐ ˈmɐdɾi ˈdi ˈdeus]) (Swamp of the Mother of God) is a city located in the state of Pernambuco, Brazil. Located at 202 km away from Recife, capital of the state of Pernambuco. Has an estimated (IBGE 2020) population of 51,225 inhabitants. It is nationally famous for hosting every easter a large open air theater show designated passion of Christ in New Jerusalem.

== Geography ==
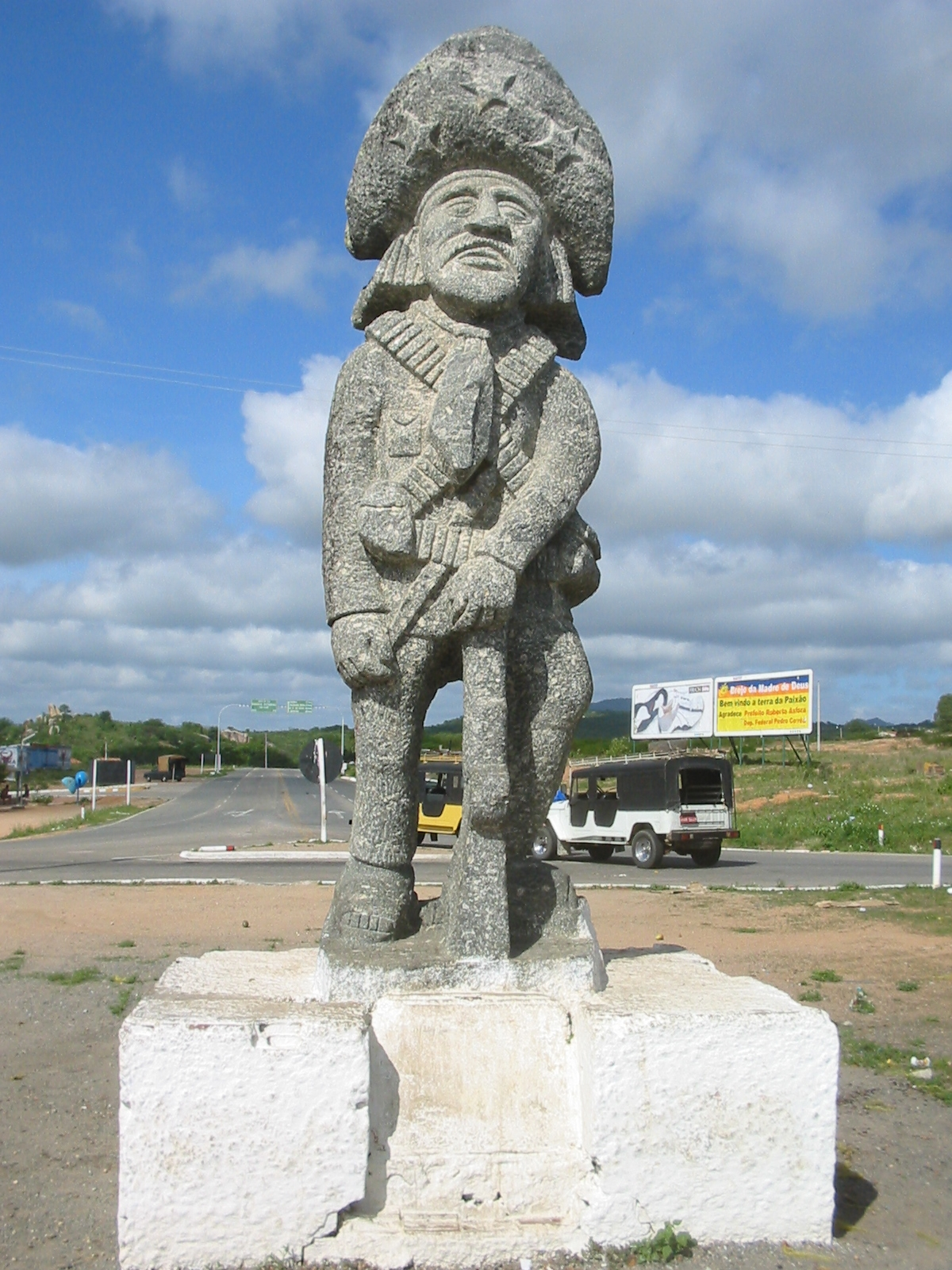
Cangaceiro statue, in the park of sculptures

- State - Pernambuco
- Region - Agreste Pernambucano
- Boundaries - Santa Cruz do Capibaribe and Taquaritinga do Norte (N); Belo Jardim, São Caetano and Tacaimbó (S); Caruaru (E); Jataúba (W).
- Area - 762.09 km^{2}
- Elevation - 627 m
- Hydrography - Capibaribe River
- Vegetation - Subcaducifólia forest
- Climate - Semi arid Hot
- Annual average temperature - 22.0 c
- Distance to Recife - 202 km

== Tourism ==
In Fazenda Nova, which means New Farm, a district of Brejo da Madre de Deus is located the Park of Sculptures and the famous New Jerusalem theater.

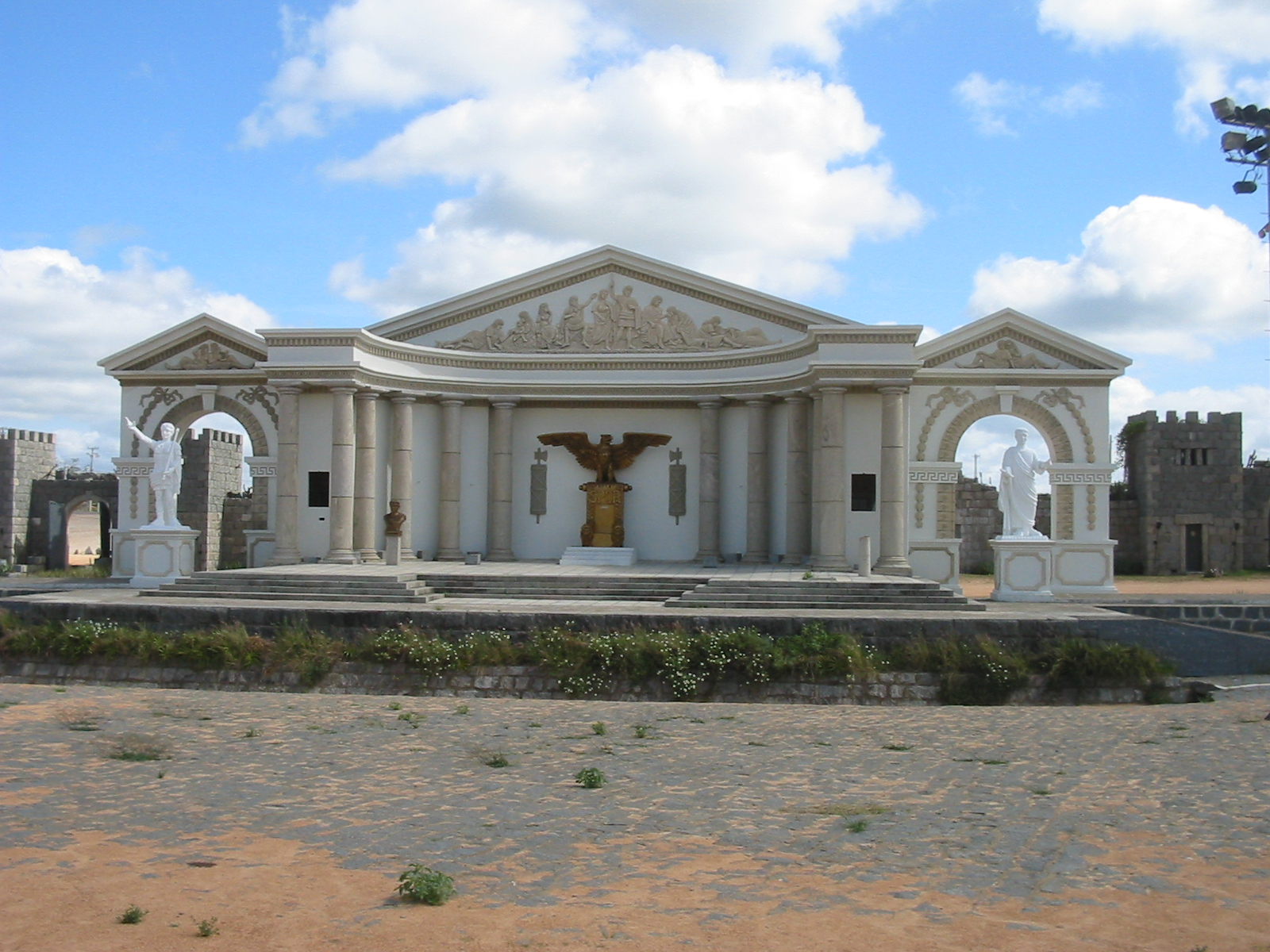
Roman Forum - stage 6

The theater city hosts every year in the Easter an outdoor theater show designated Passion of Christ which tell us the history of death and resurrection of Jesus. It is considered the largest open-air theater in the world due to its 100,000 m^{2} (1.1 million ft^{2}), surrounded by 3500 meters of walls and 70 towers.

== Economy ==
The main economic activities in Brejo da Madre de Deus are based in tourism, commerce and agribusiness, especially tomatoes; and livestock such as cattle, goats, sheep, pigs and poultry.

=== Economic indicators ===
Population	GDP x(1000 R$).	GDP pc (R$)	PE
42.250	125.475	3.116	0.21%

Economy by Sector 2006

Primary sector	Secondary sector	Service sector
8.98%	9.87%	81.15%

=== Health indicators ===
HDI (2000)	Hospitals (2007)	Hospitals beds (2007)	Children's Mortality every 1000 (2005)
0.579	2	57	13.7

== Gallery ==
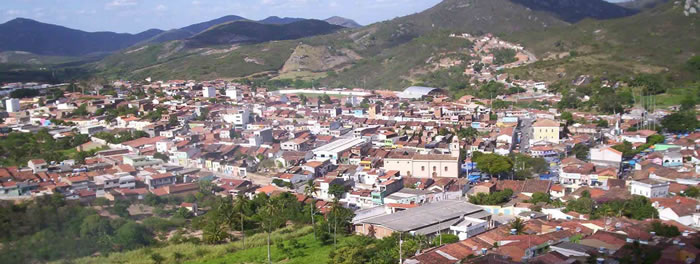
Aerial view of Brejo da Madre de Deus

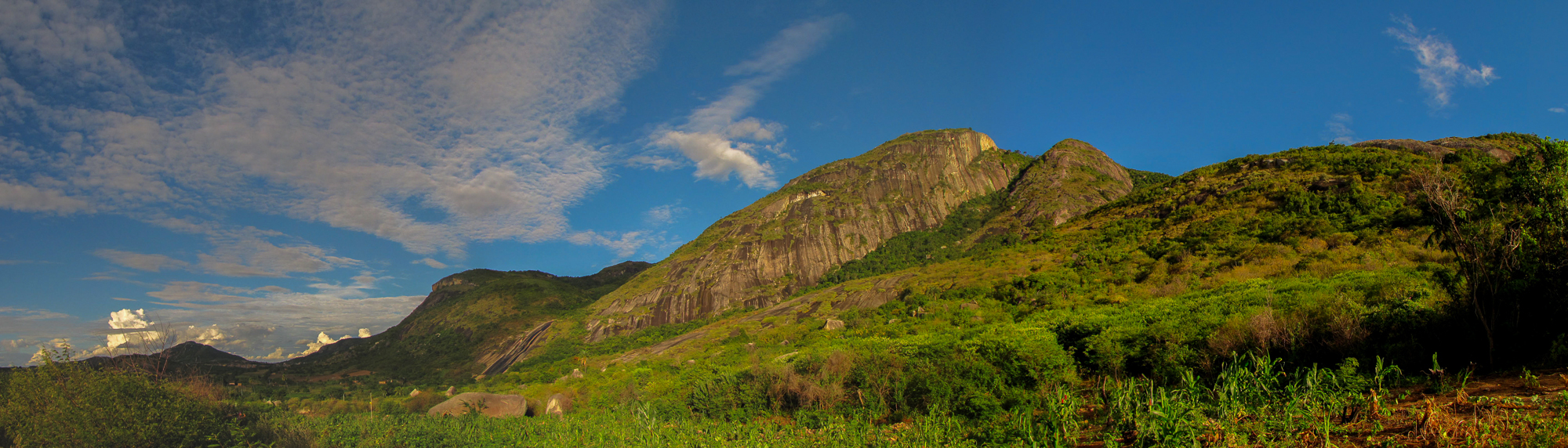
Serra do Ponto

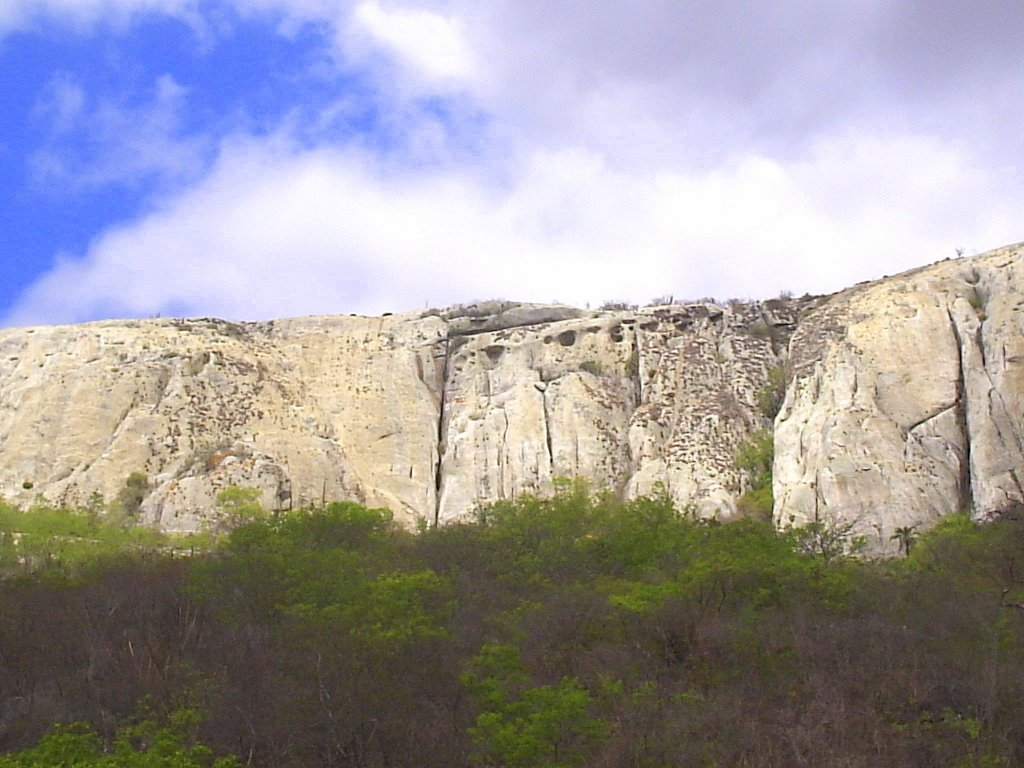
Serra das Barracas

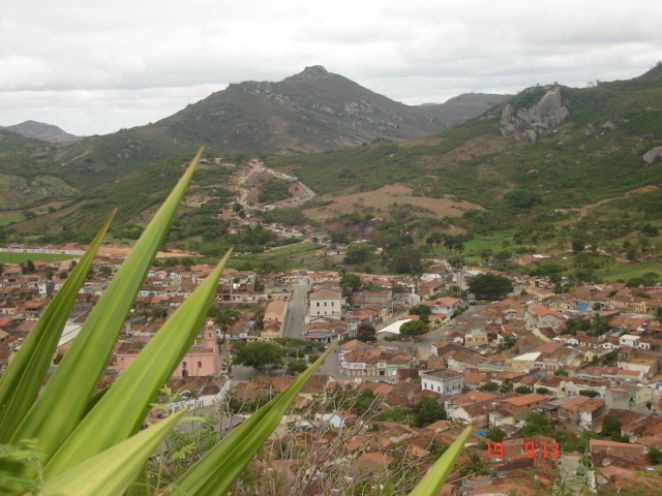
Aerial view of Brejo da Madre de Deus

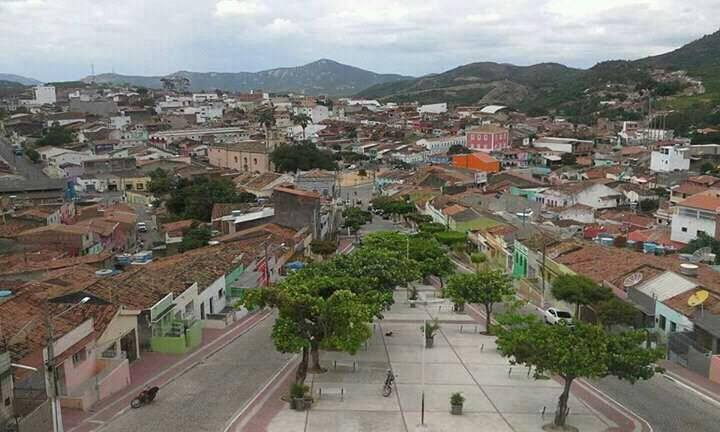
Aerial view of Brejo da Madre de Deus

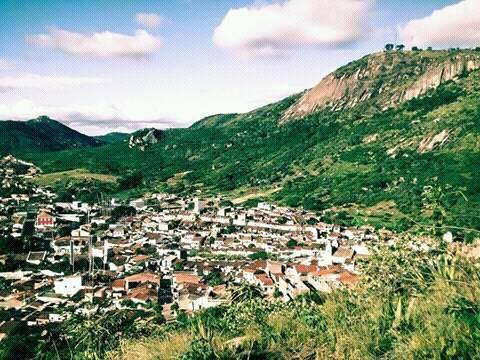
Aerial view of Brejo da Madre de Deus

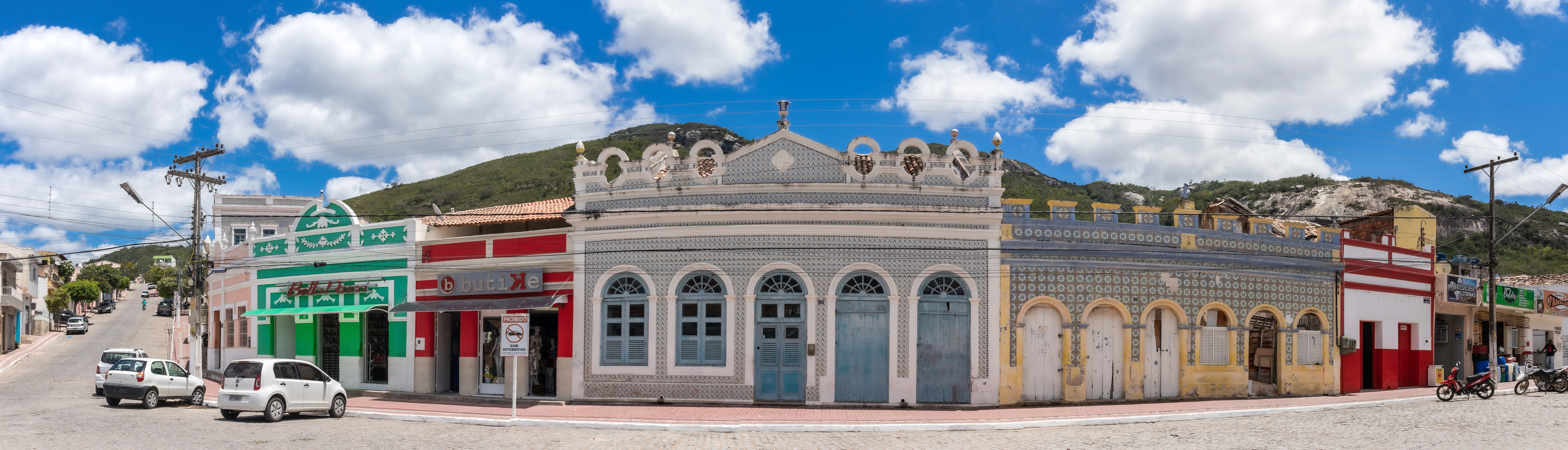
Historic center of Brejo da Madre de Deus

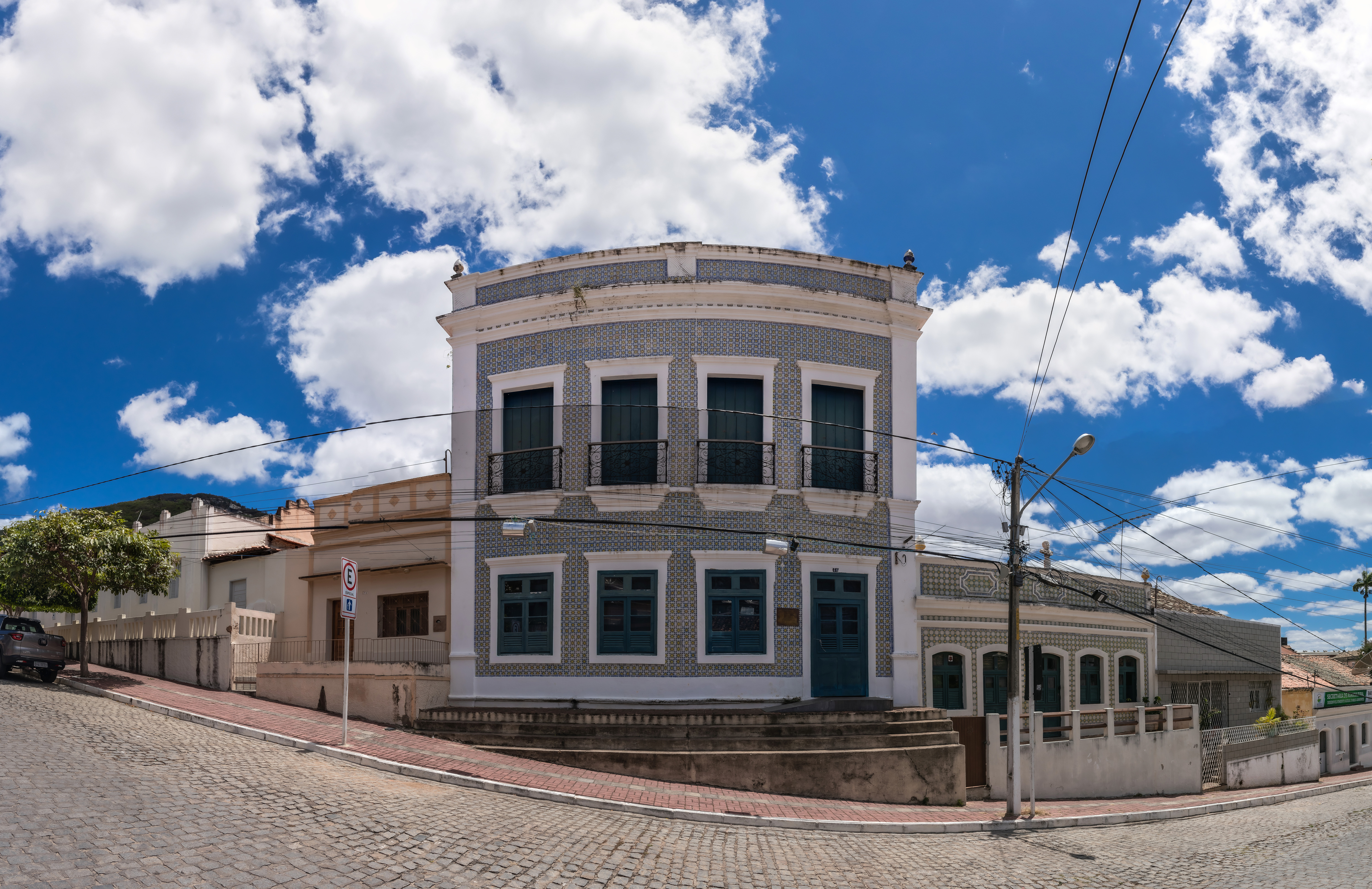
Brejo da Madre de Deus Historical Museum

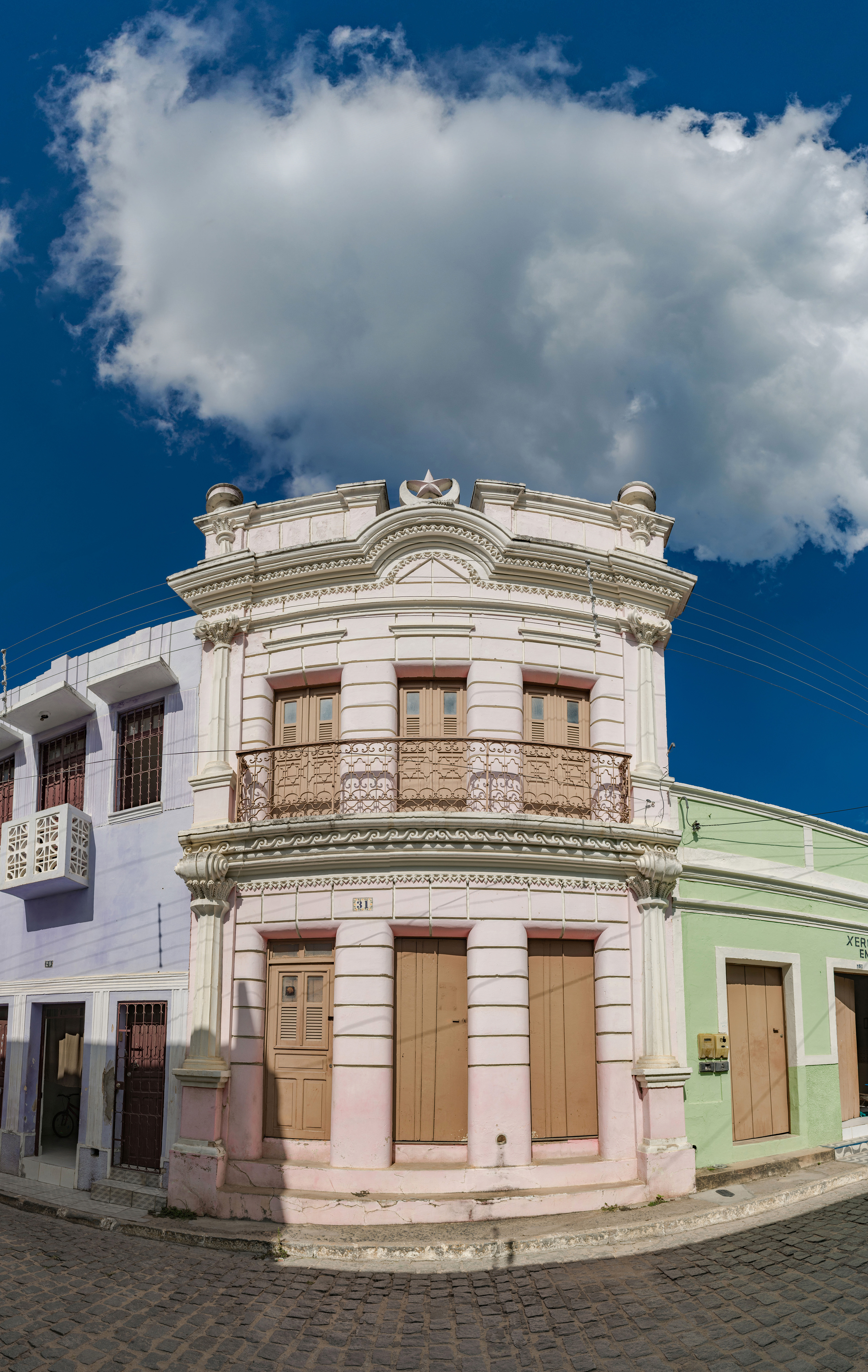
Historic center of Brejo da Madre de Deus

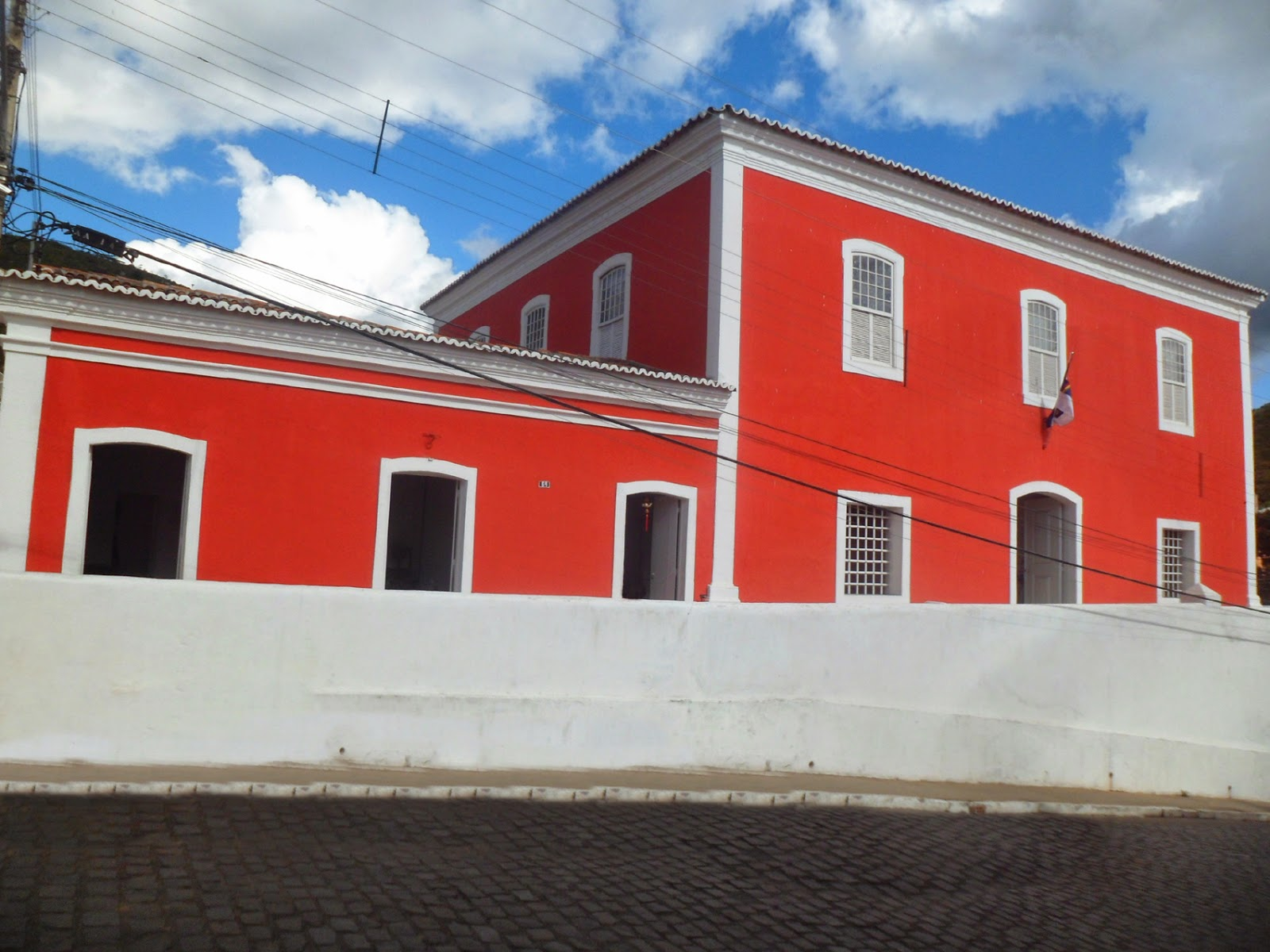
Old Town Hall and Jail

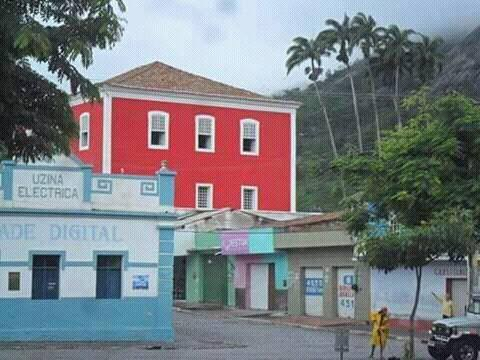
Old Town Hall and Jail

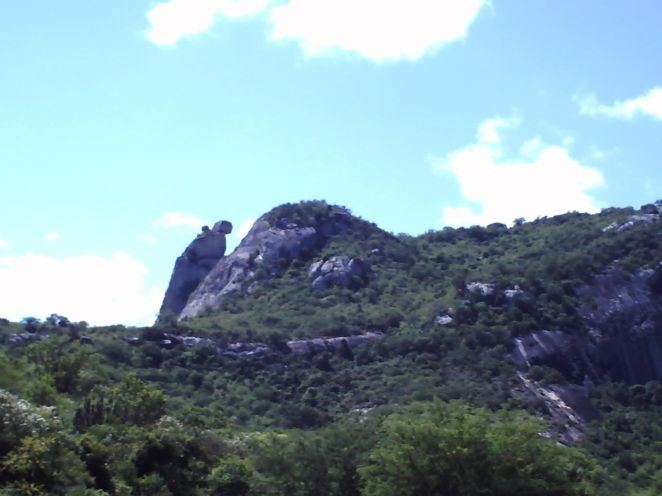
Pedra da Bicuda

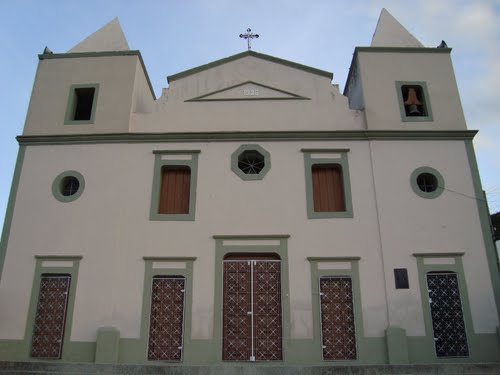
Saint Joseph parish church

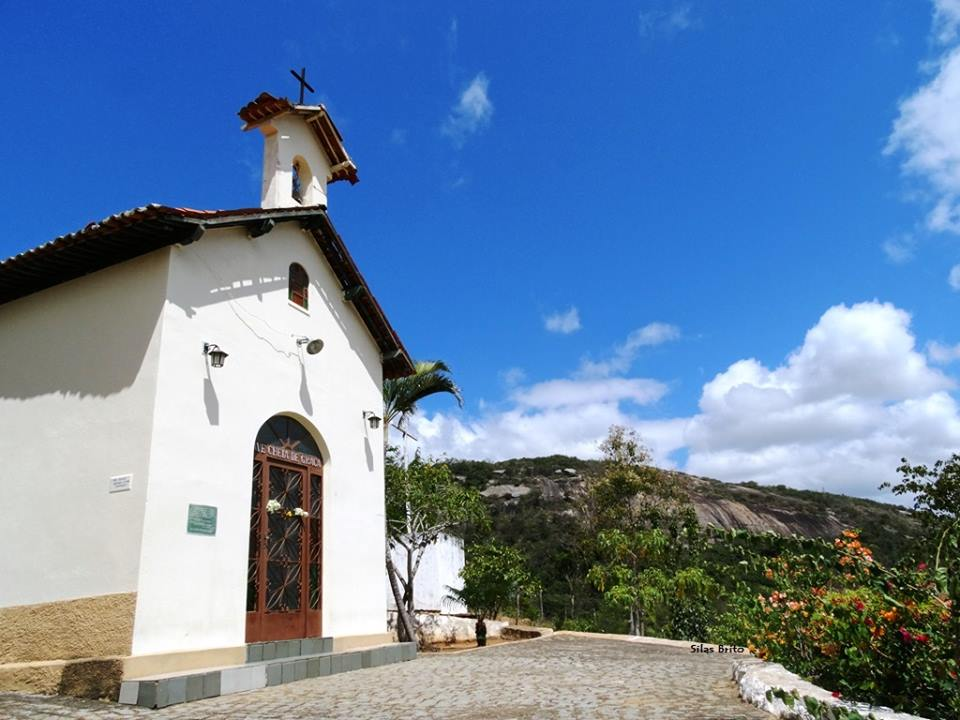
Church of Mother Queen

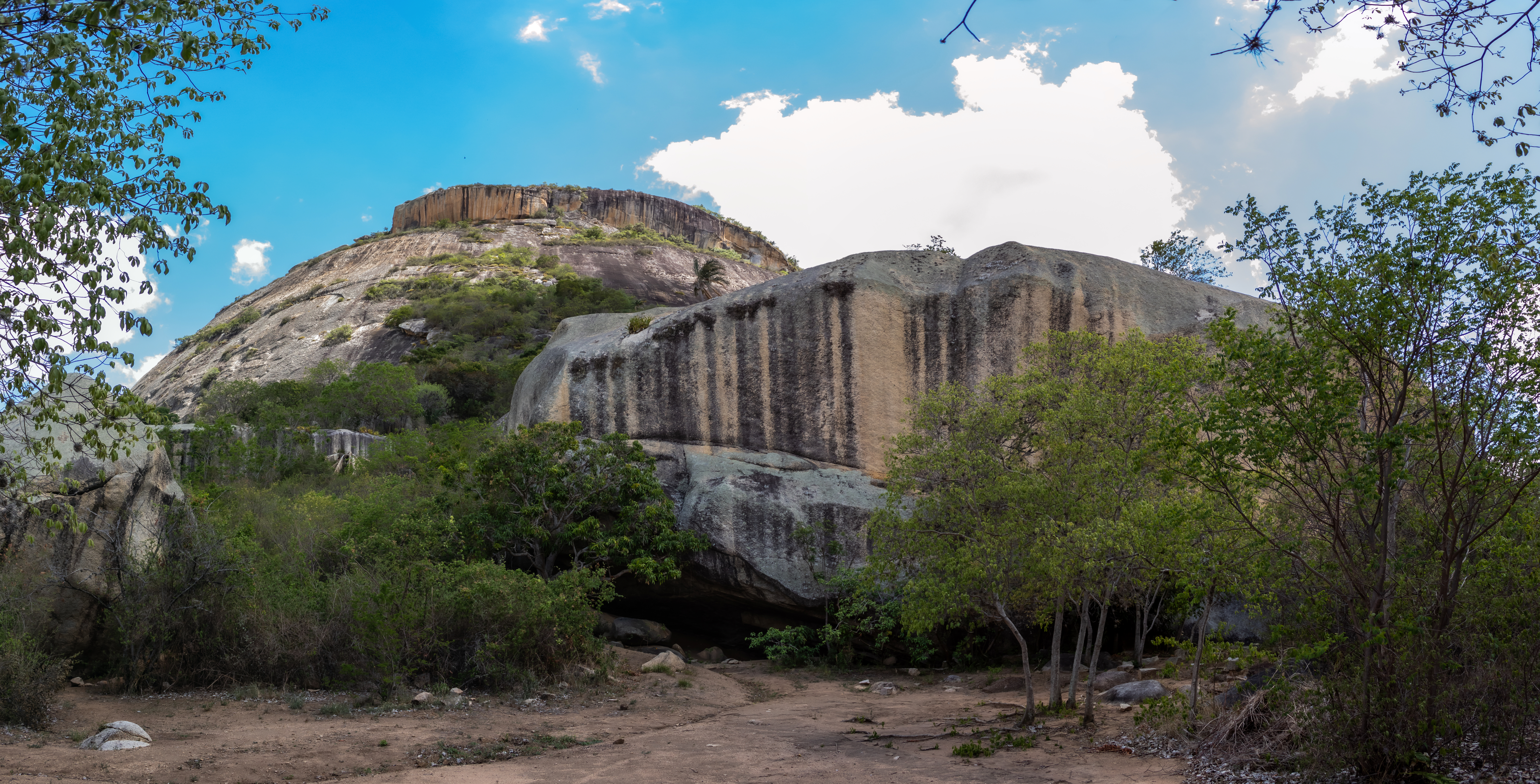
Furna do Estrago Archaeological Site

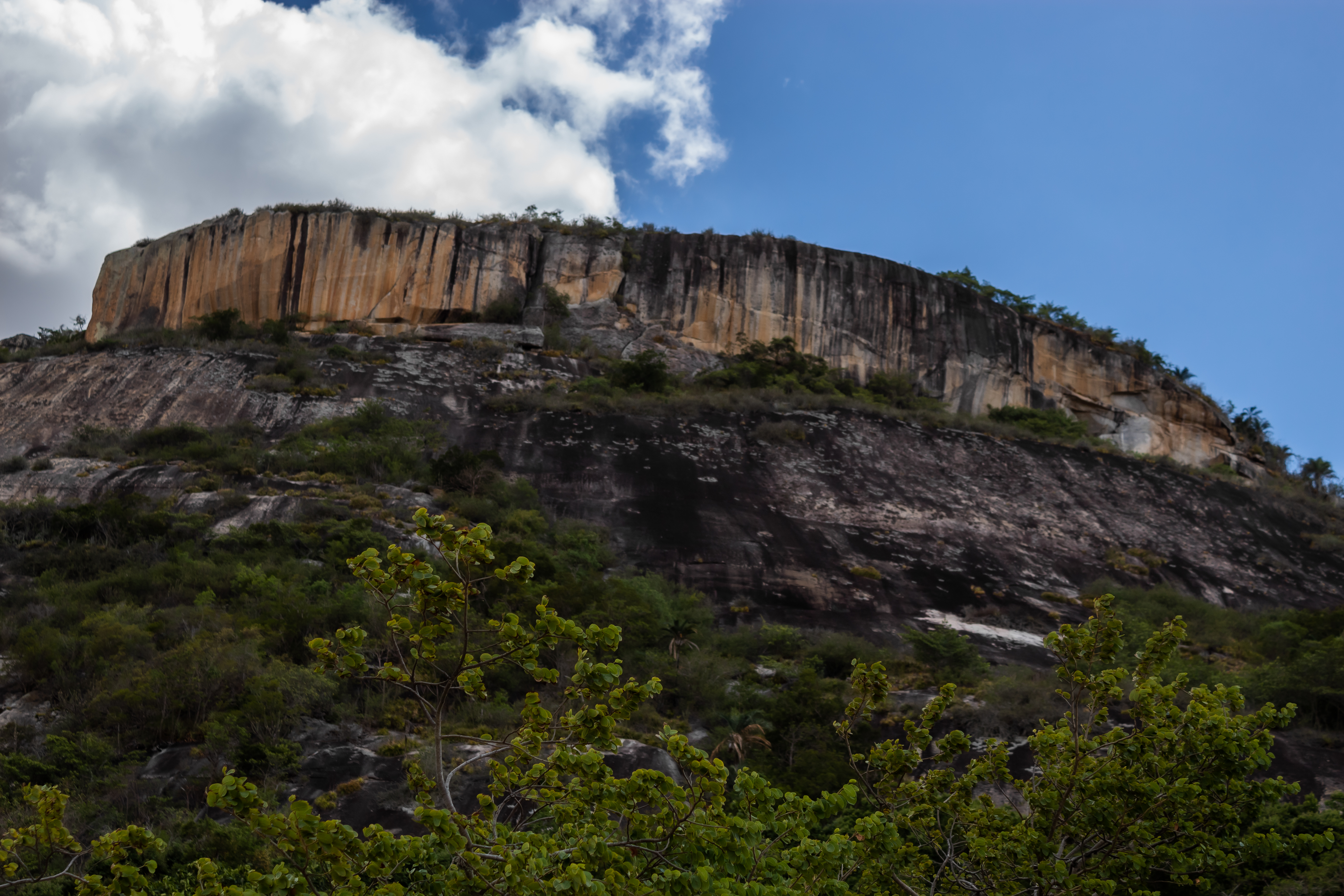
Furna do Estrago Archaeological Site

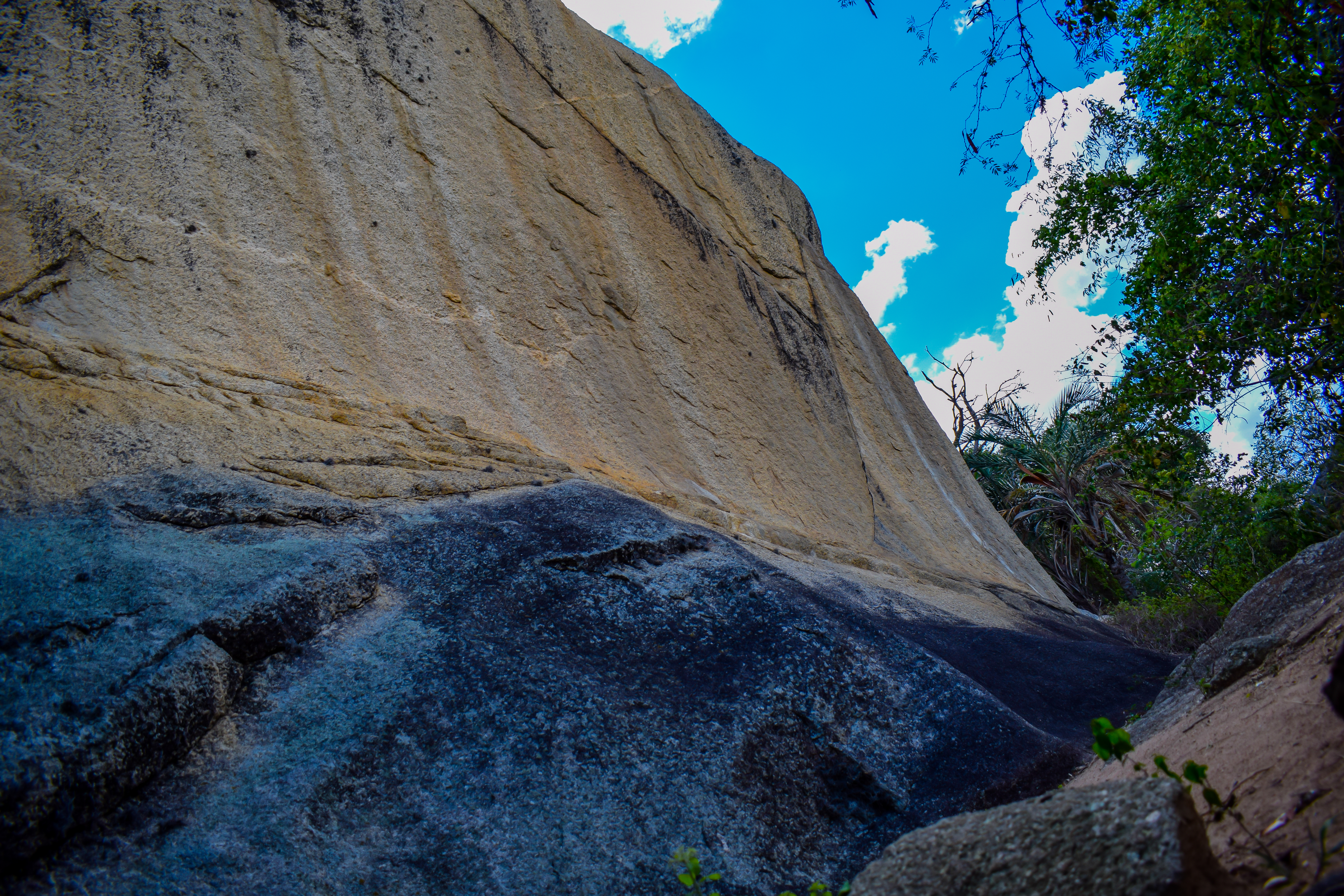
Furna do Estrago Archaeological Site

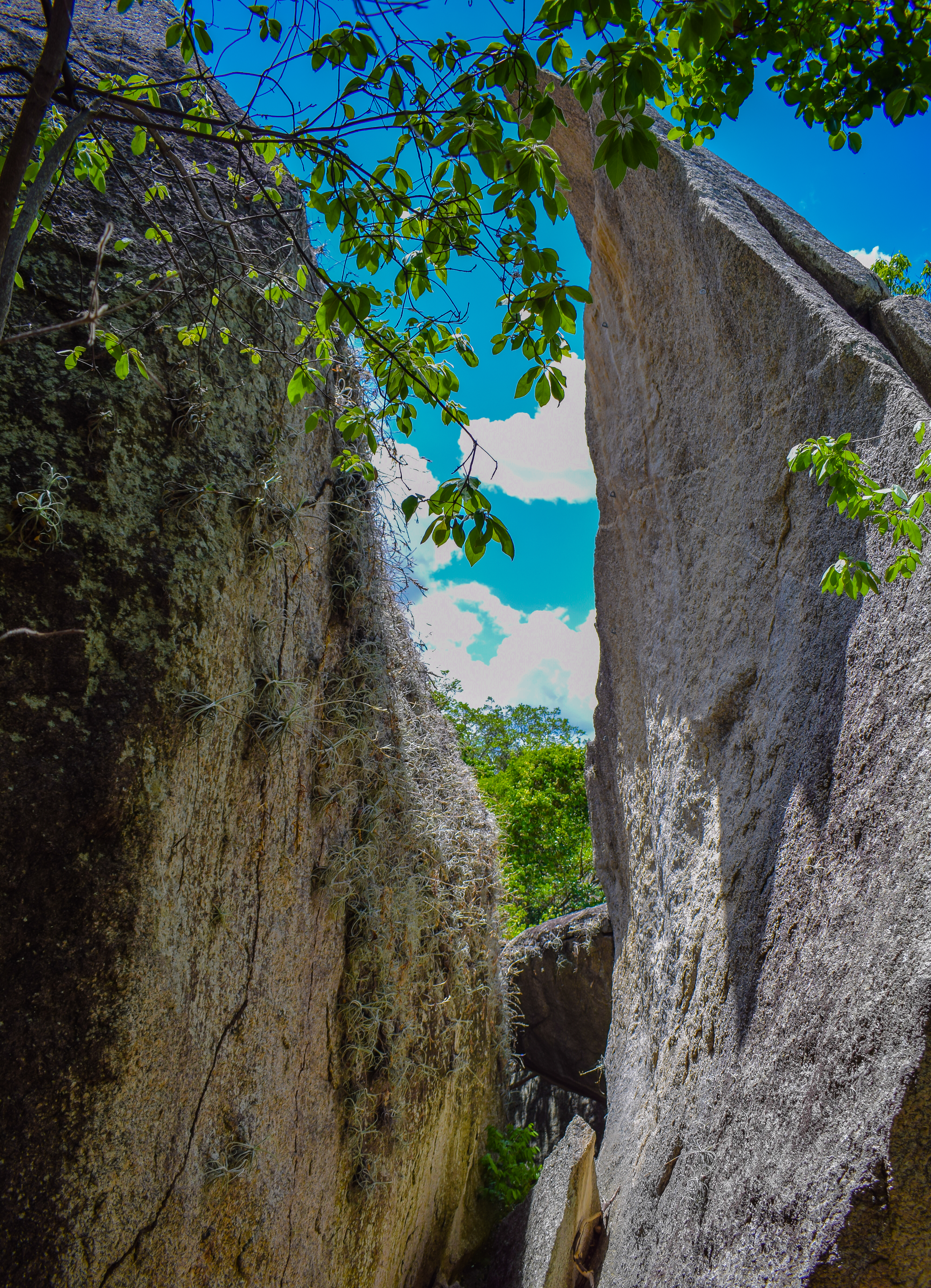
Furna do Estrago Archaeological Site

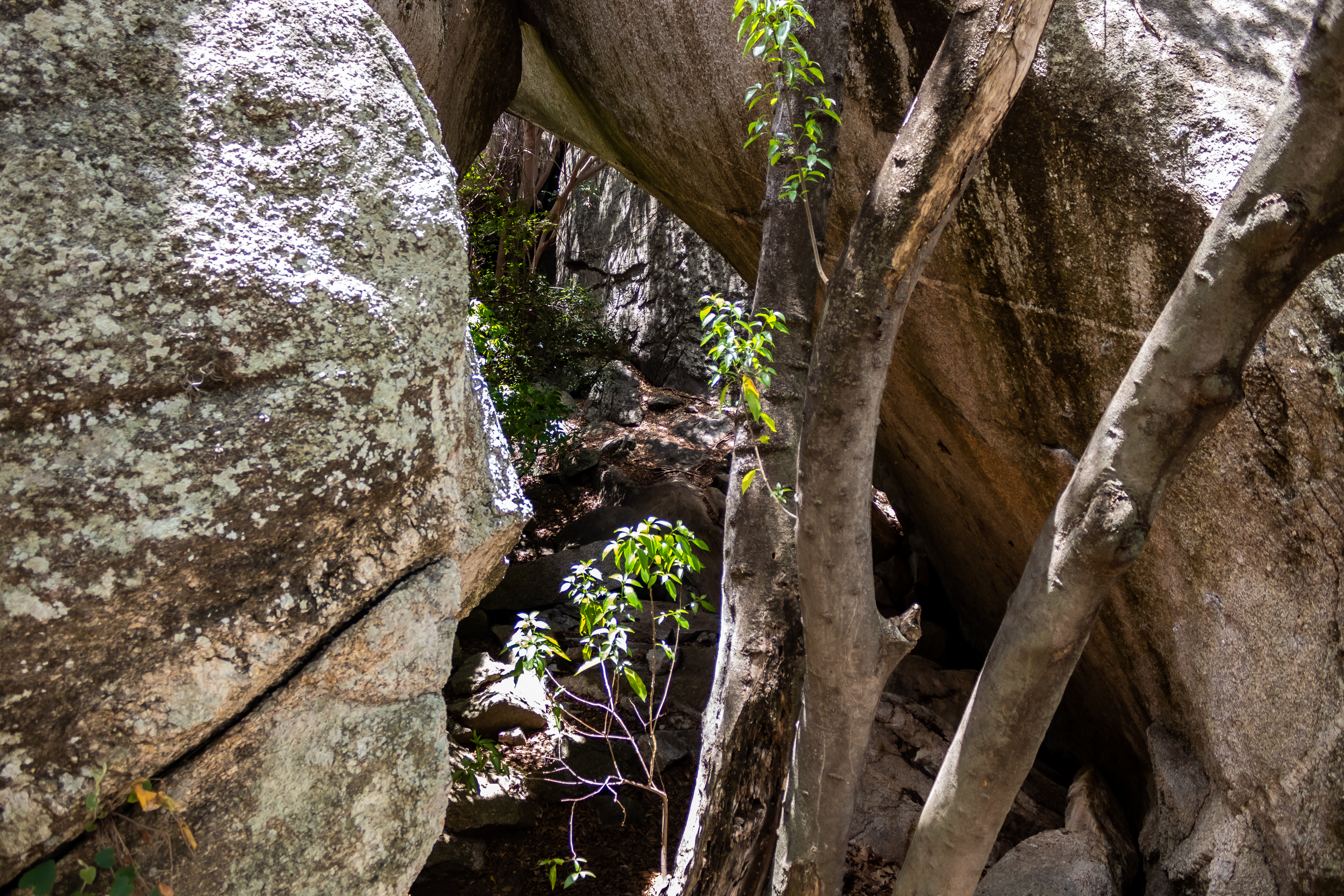
Furna do Estrago Archaeological Site

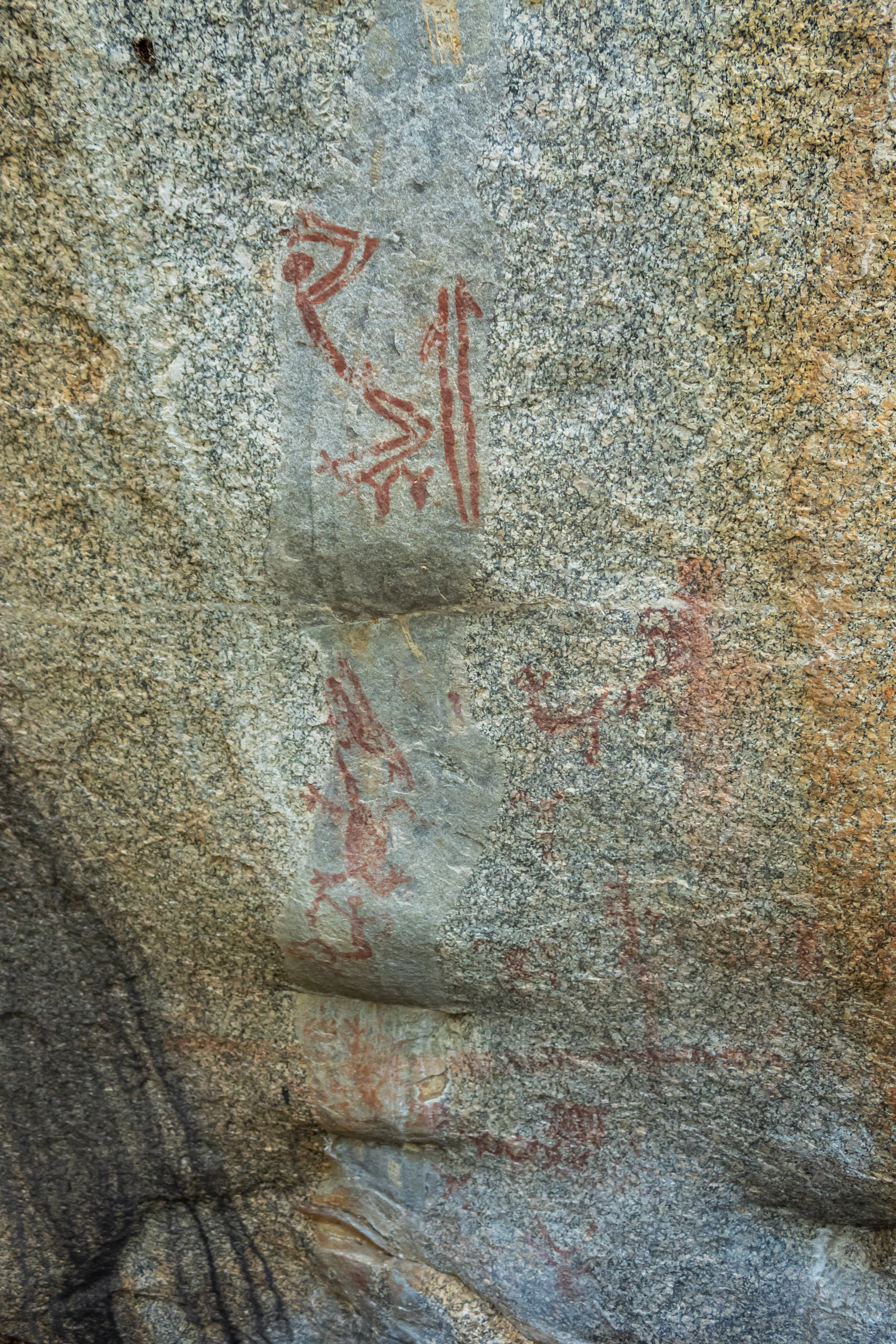
Furna do Estrago Archaeological Site

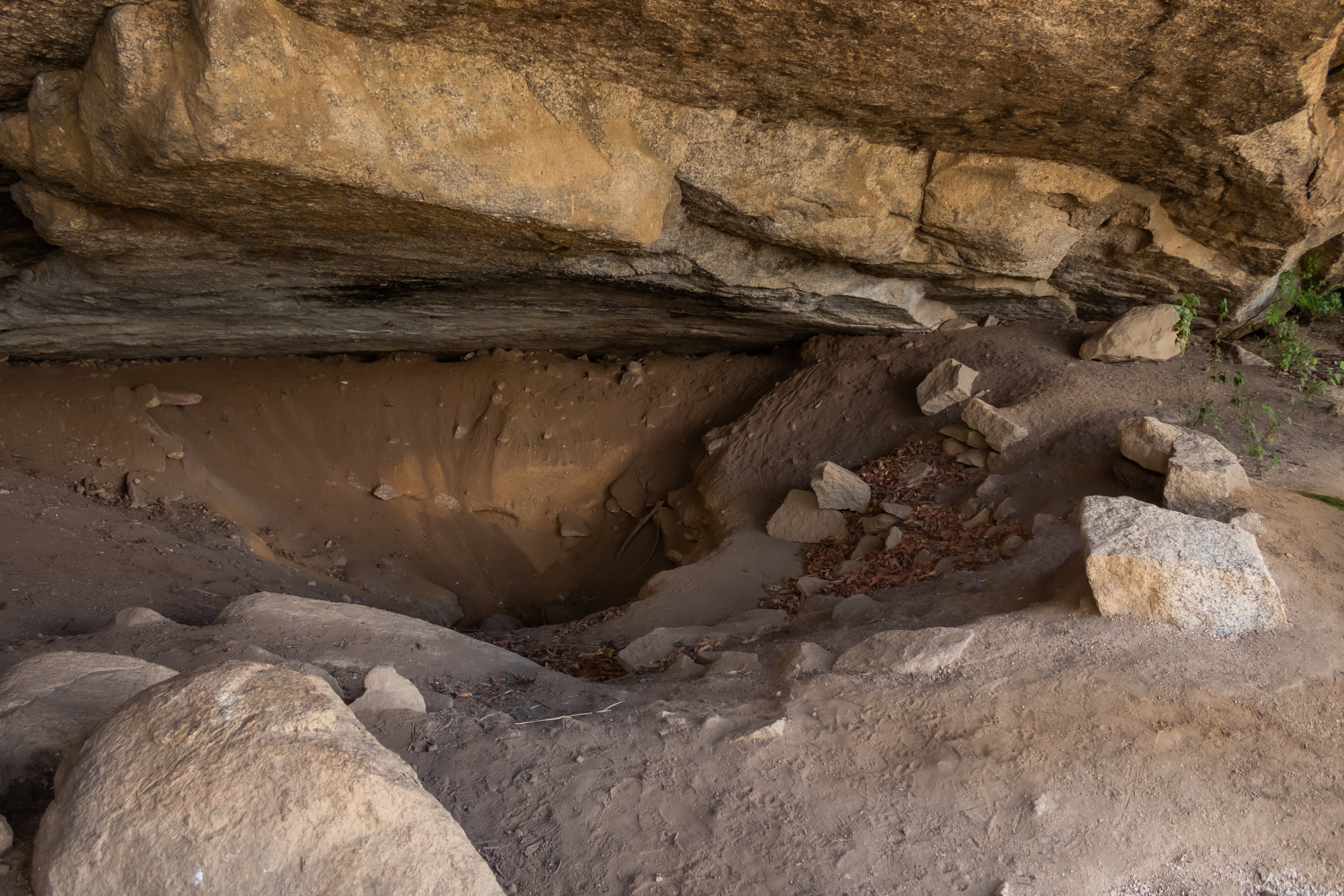
Furna do Estrago Archaeological Site

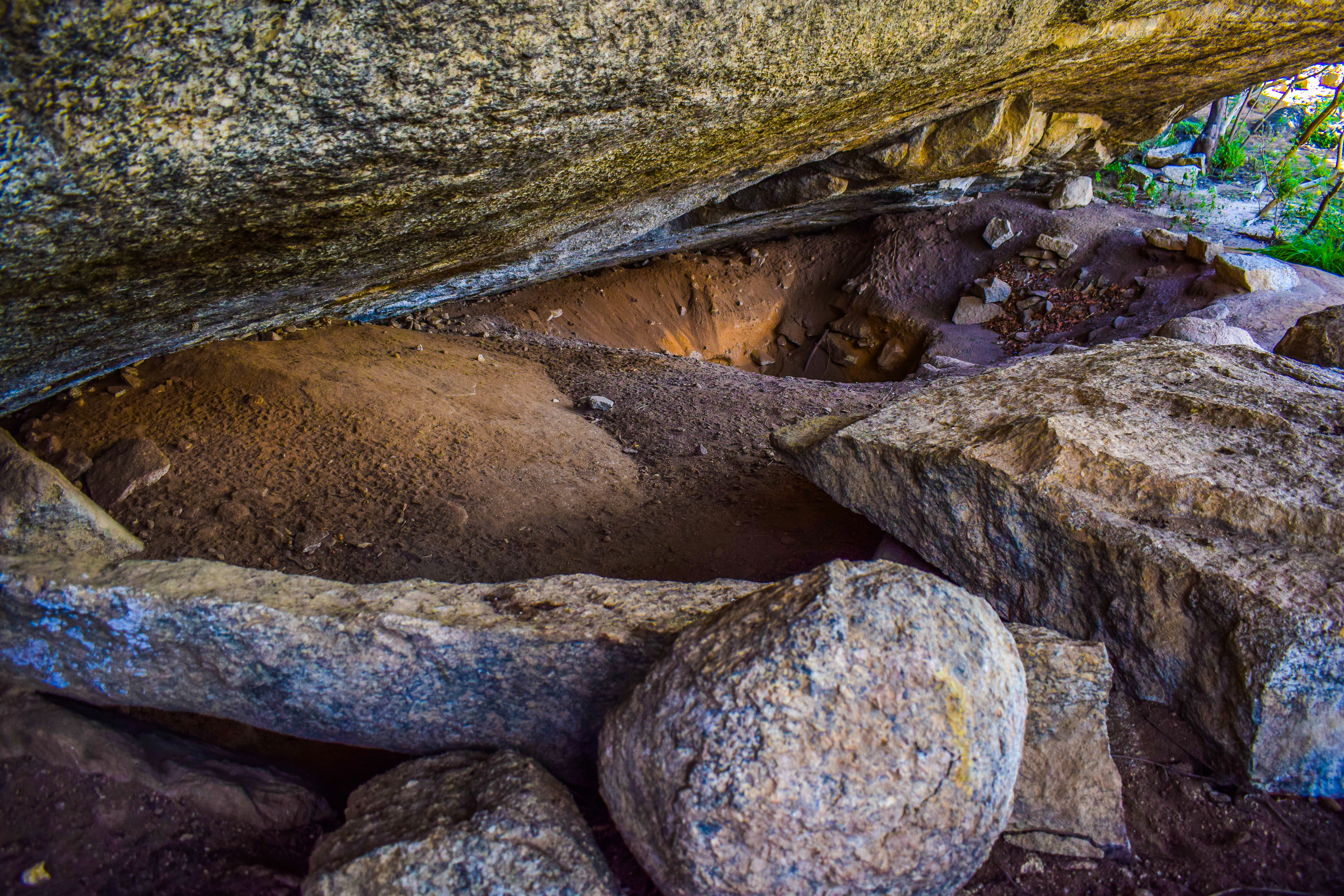
Furna do Estrago Archaeological Site

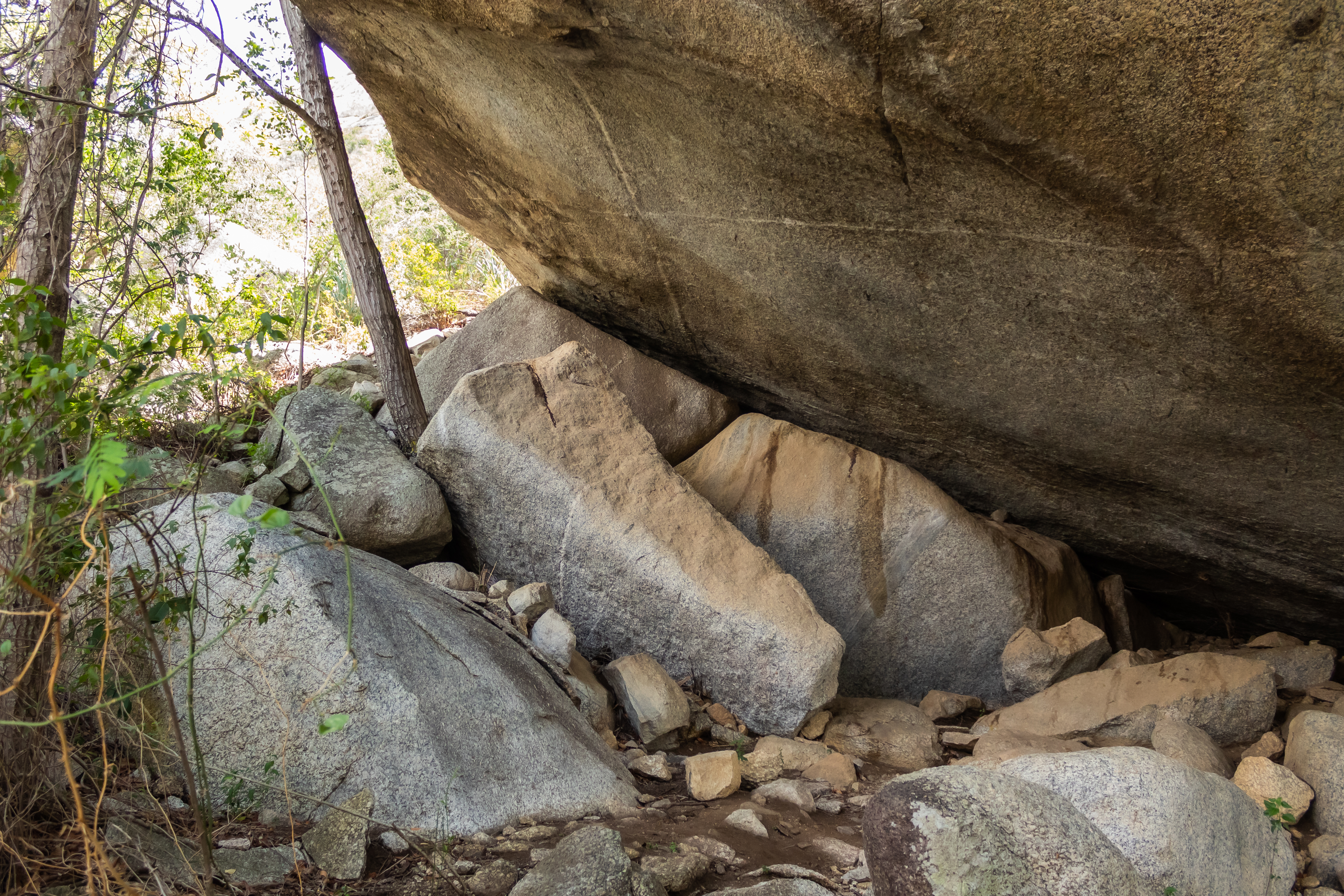
Furna do Estrago Archaeological Site

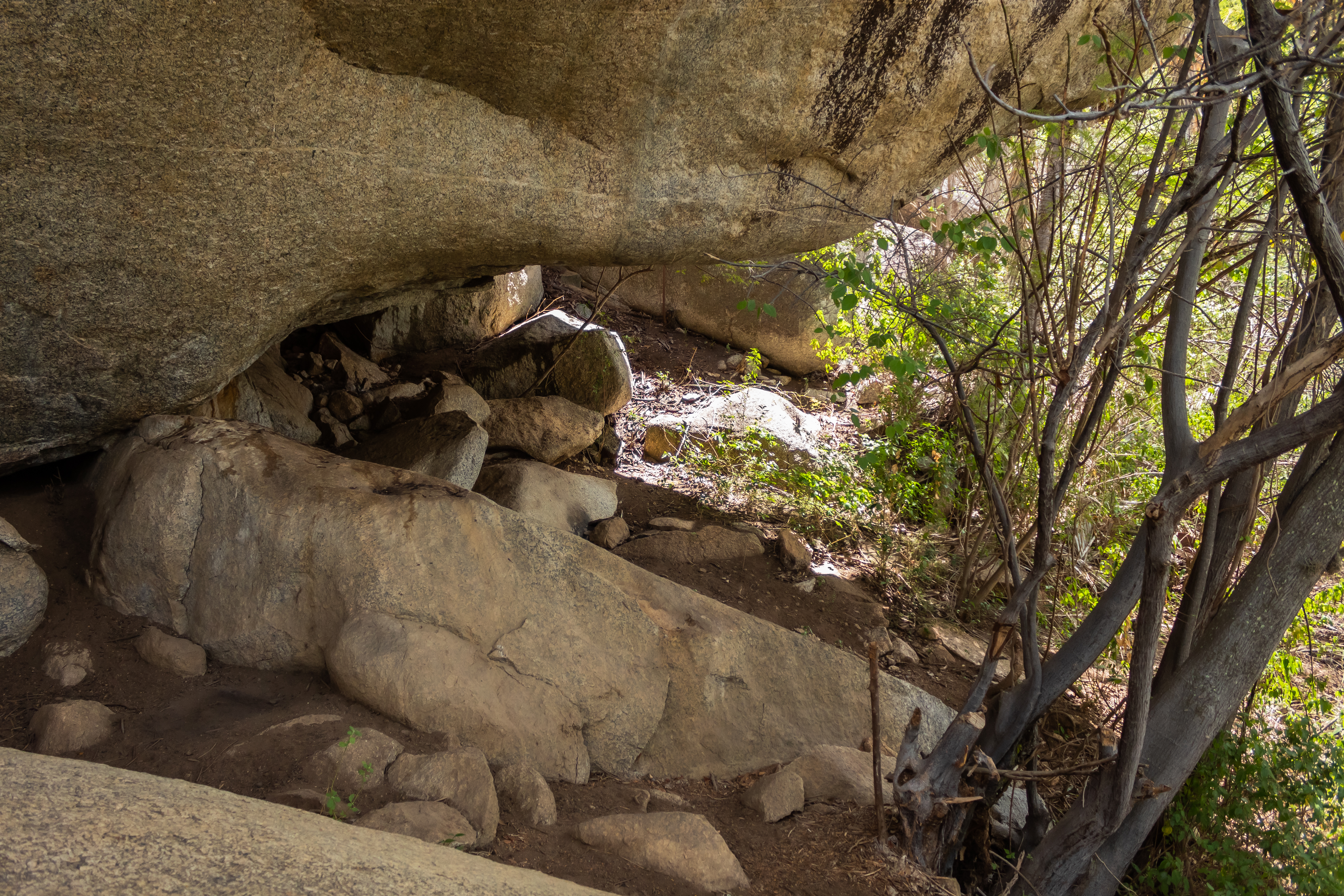
Furna do Estrago Archaeological Site

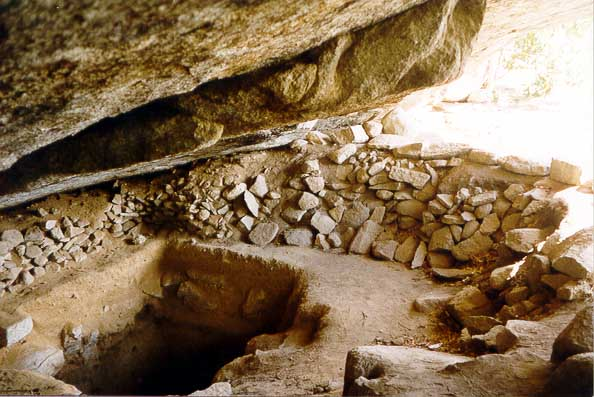
Archaeological site

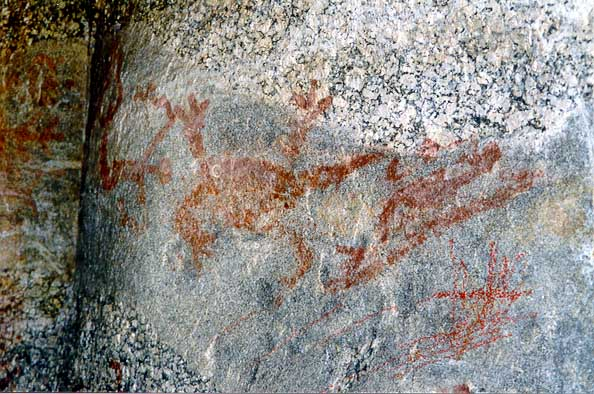
Archaeological site

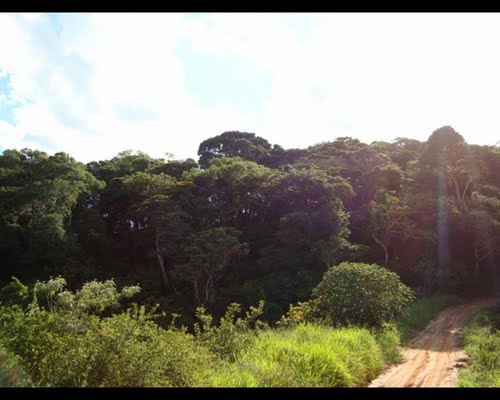
Bitury Forest

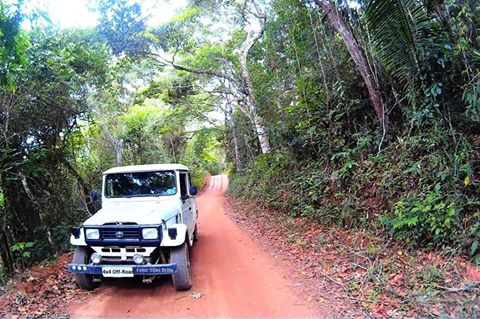
Bitury Forest

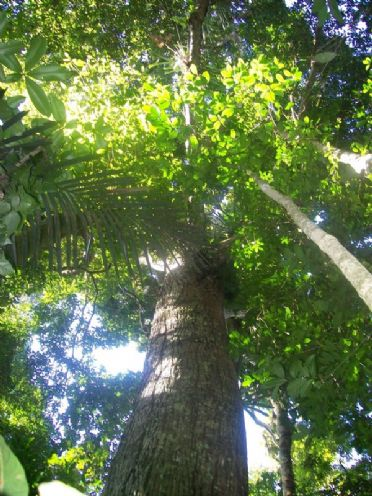
Bitury Forest

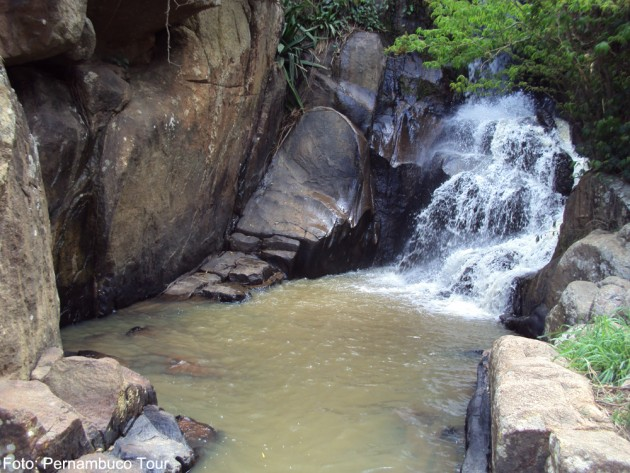
Bitury Forest

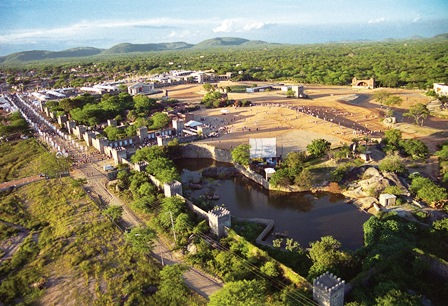
Aerial view of Passion of Christ in New Jerusalem theater

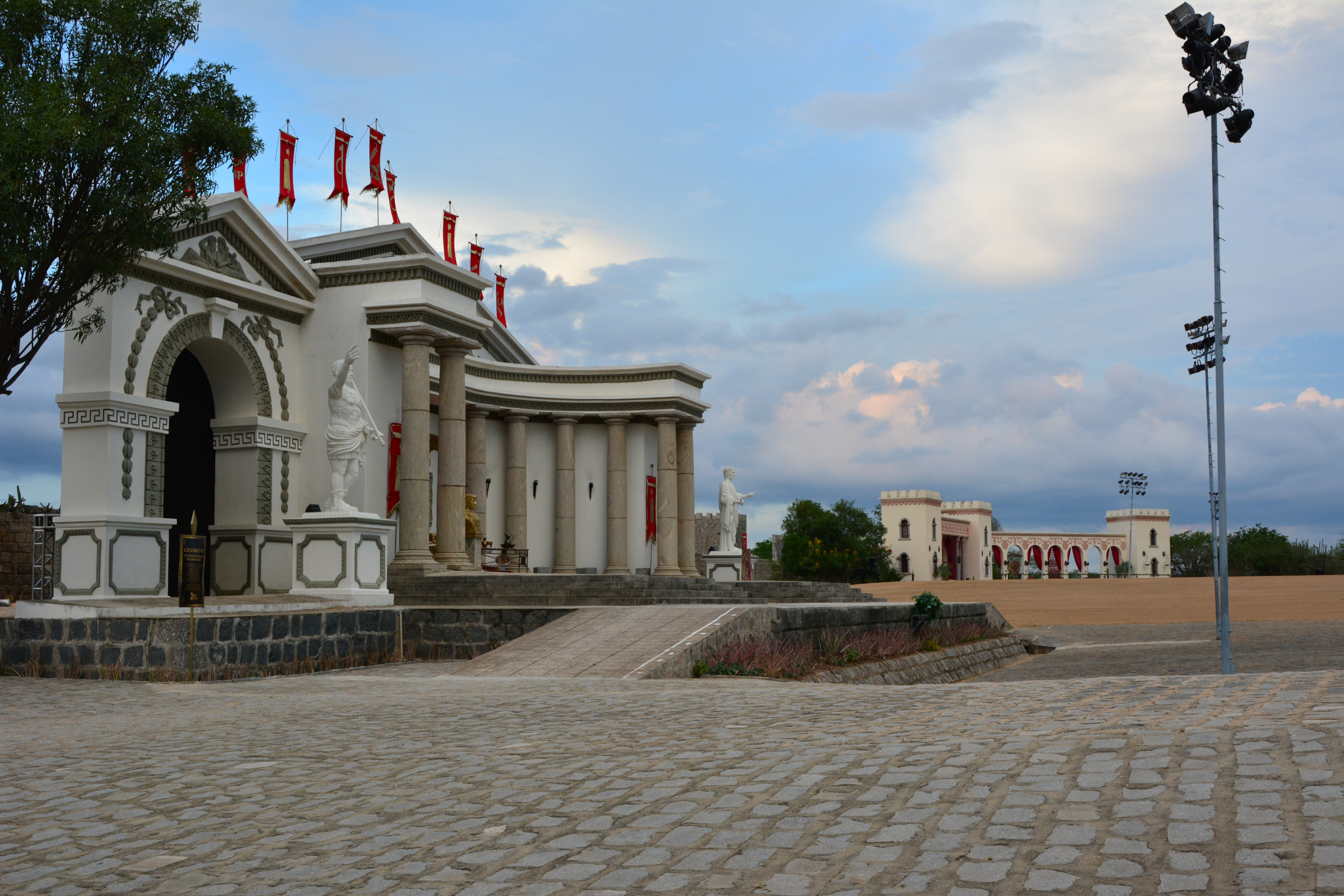
Passion of Christ in New Jerusalem theater

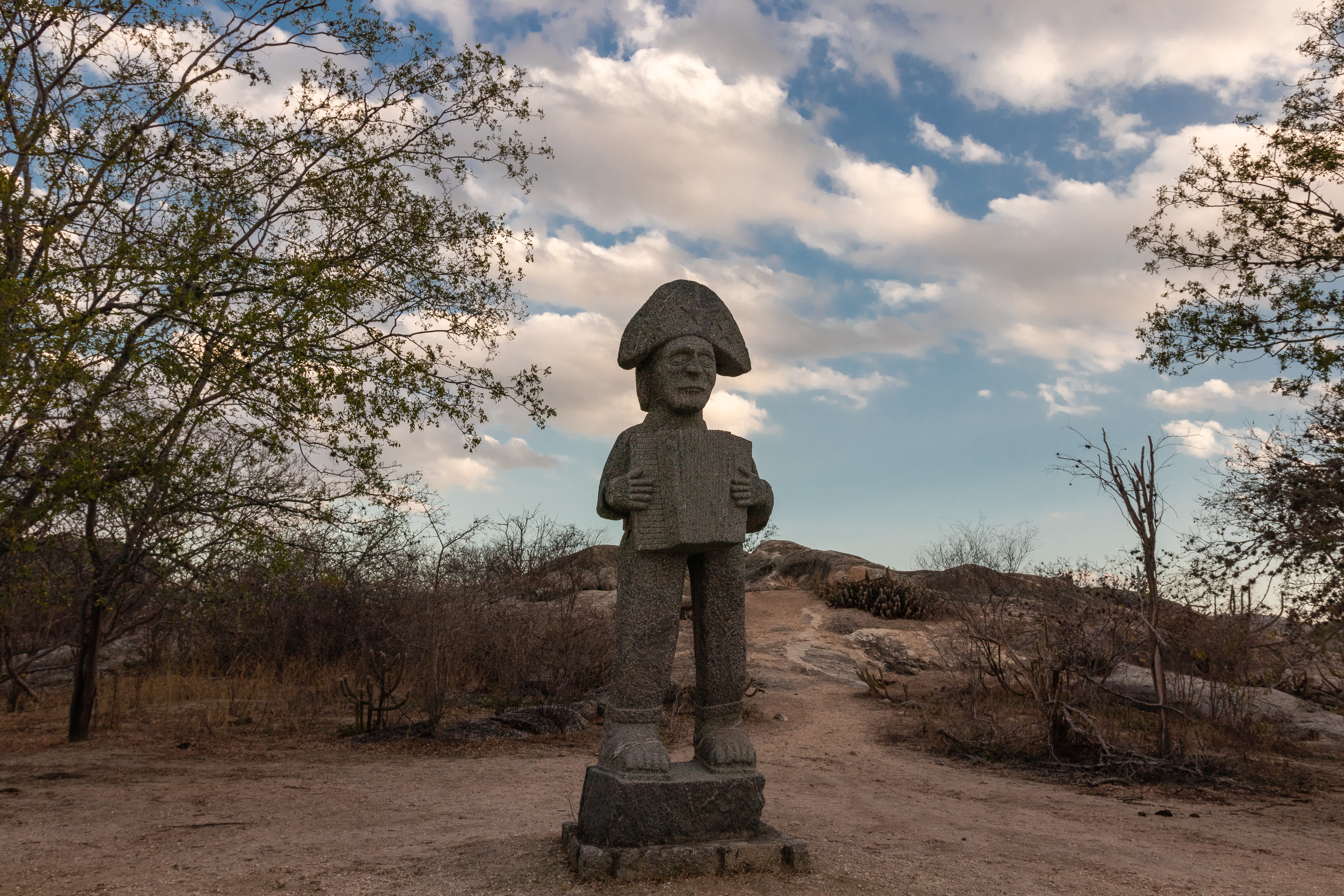
Nilo Coelho Sculpture Park

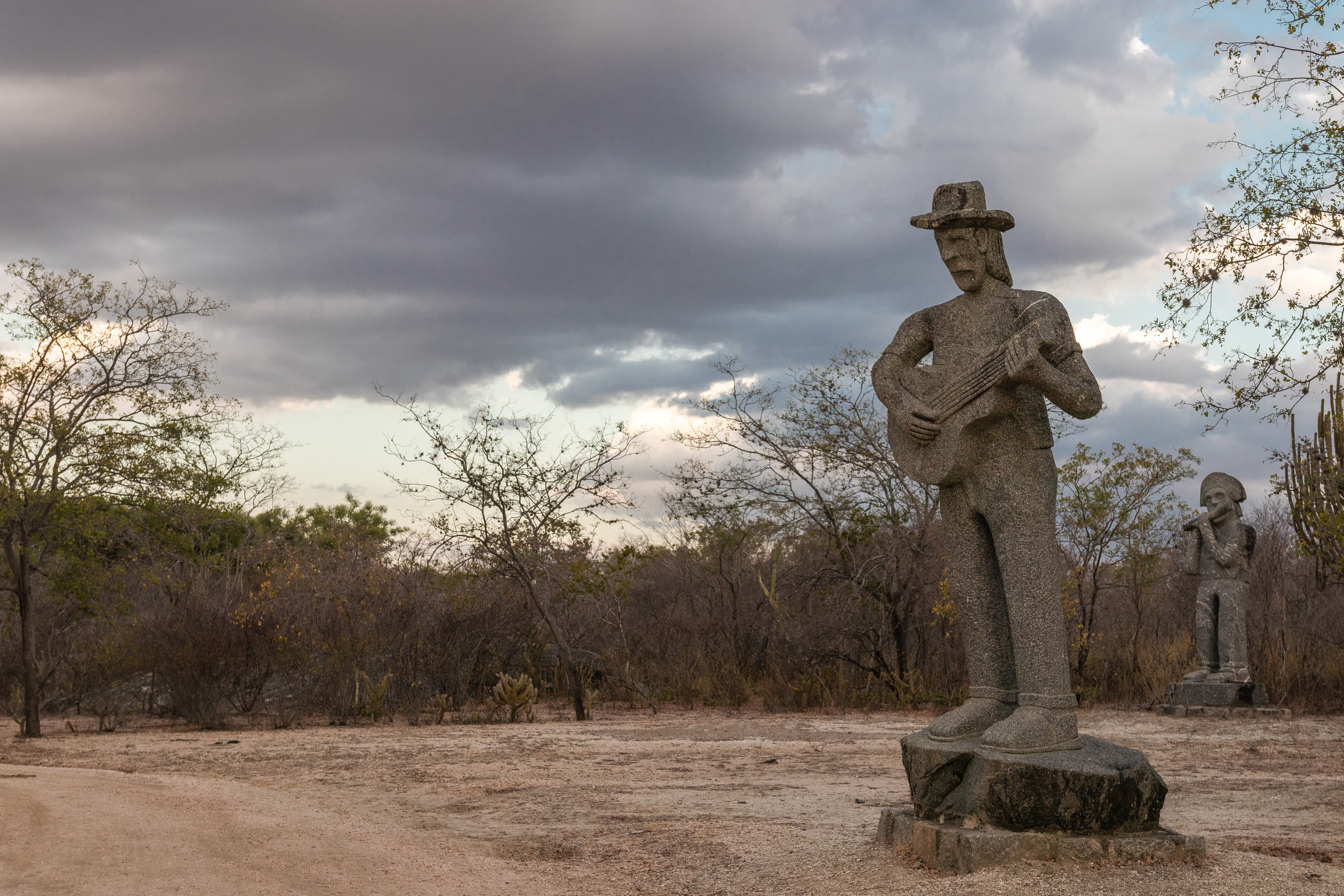
Nilo Coelho Sculpture Park

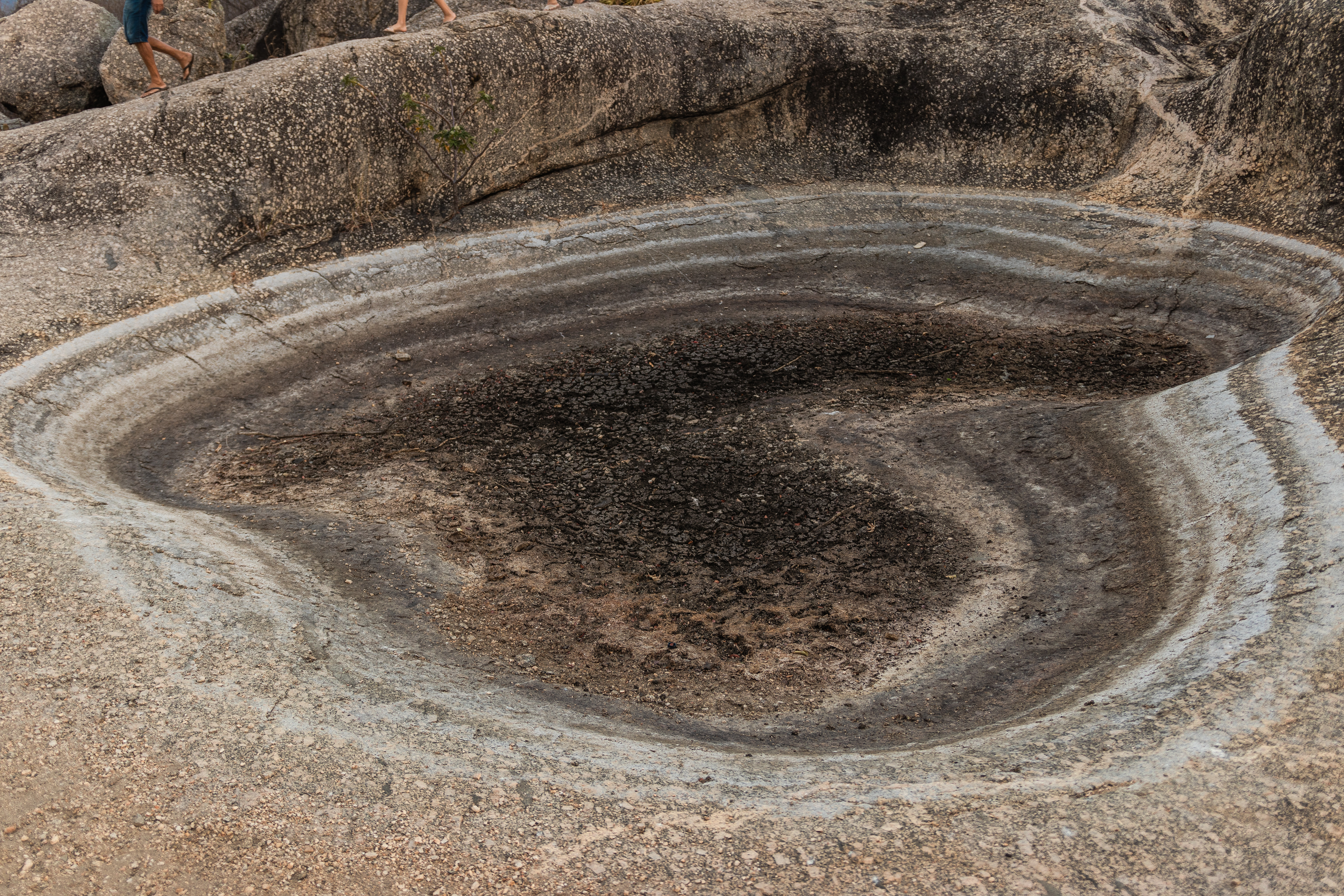
Nilo Coelho Sculpture Park

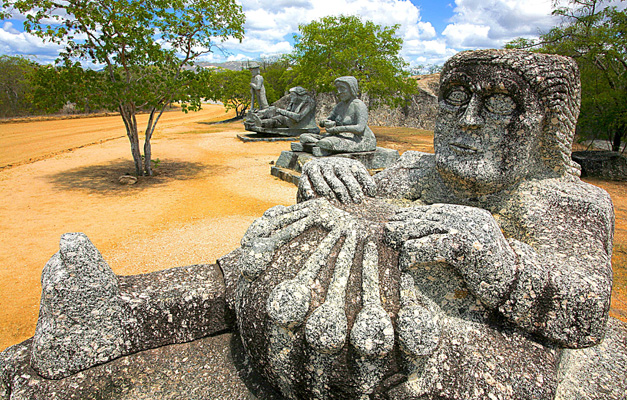
Sculpture Park

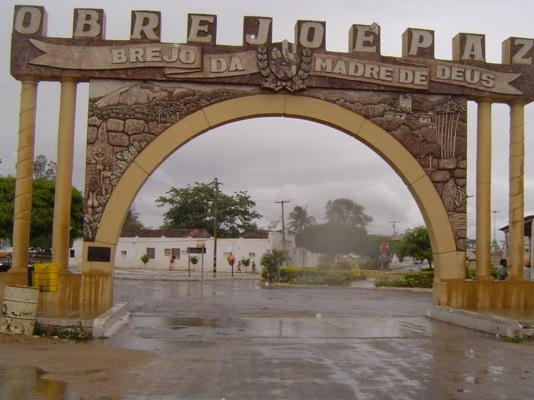
Fazenda Nova district

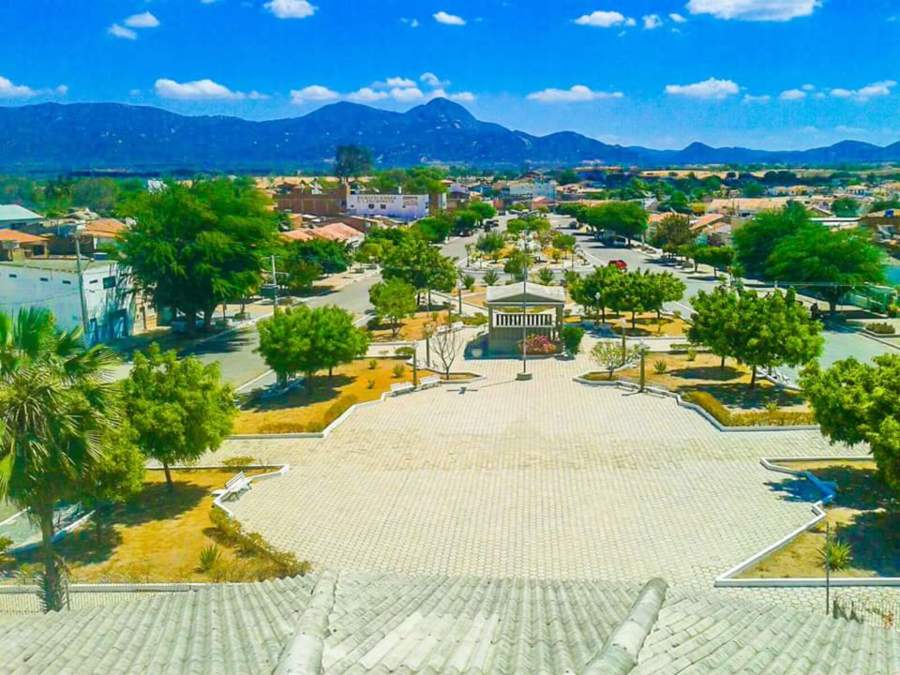
Fazenda Nova district

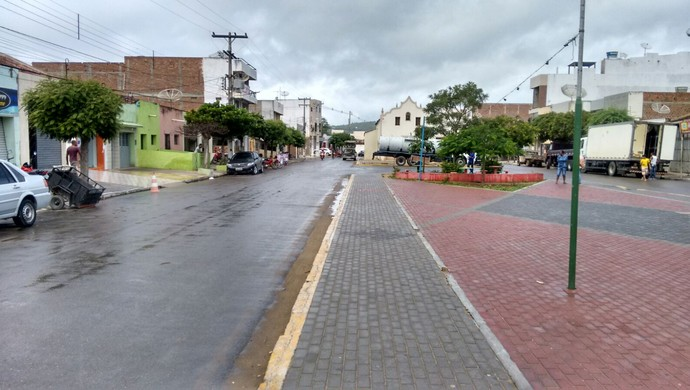
São Domingos district

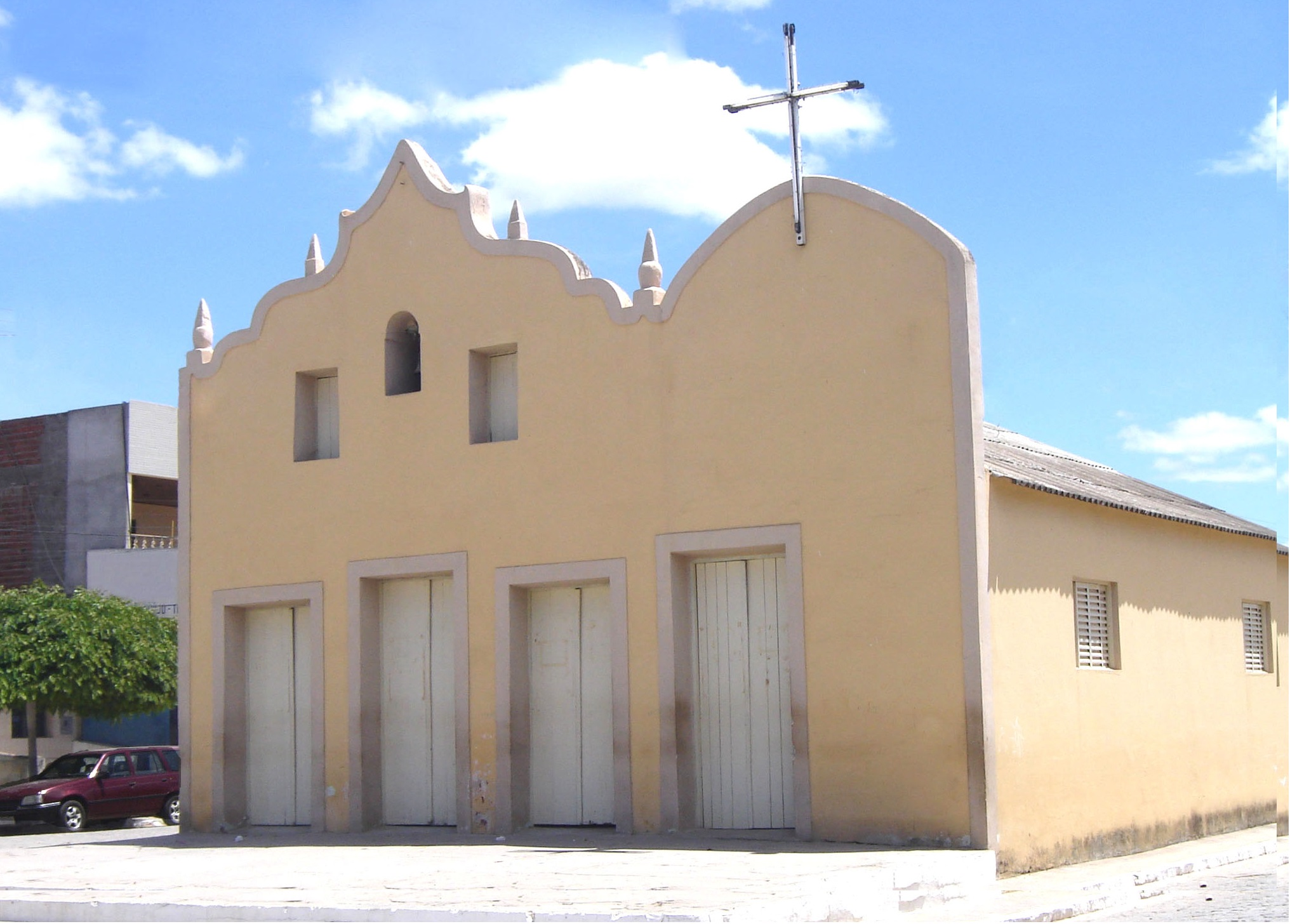
Church of Saint Dominic Guzman

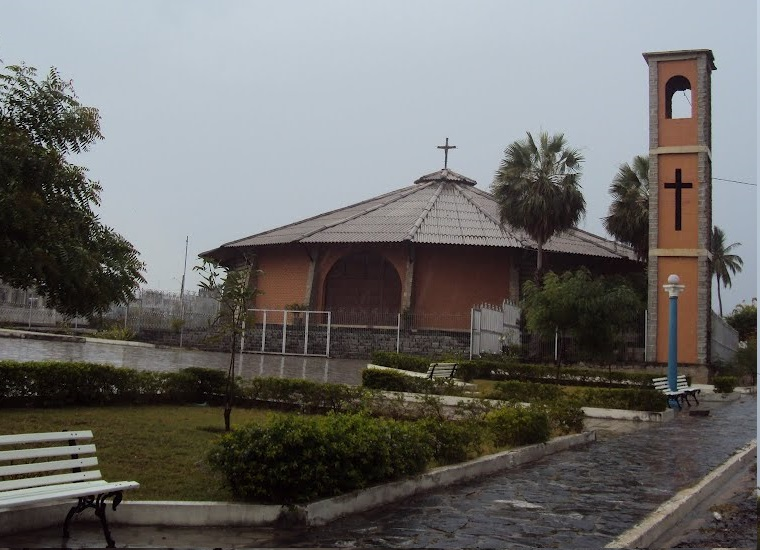
Church of Our Lady of Conception

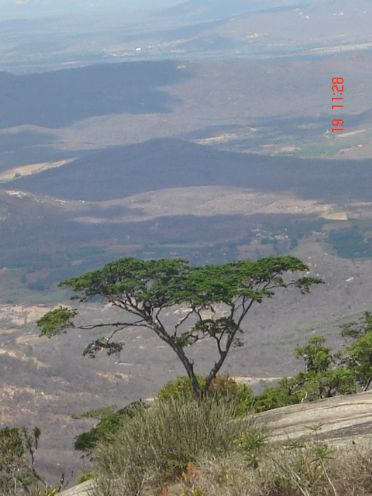
Serra do Ponto

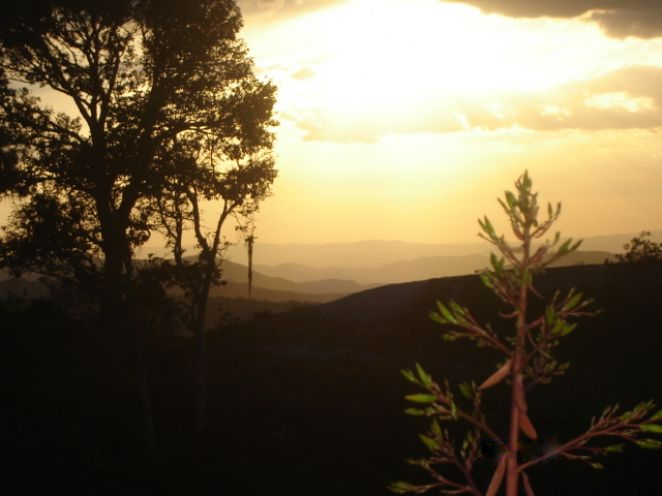
Serra do Ponto

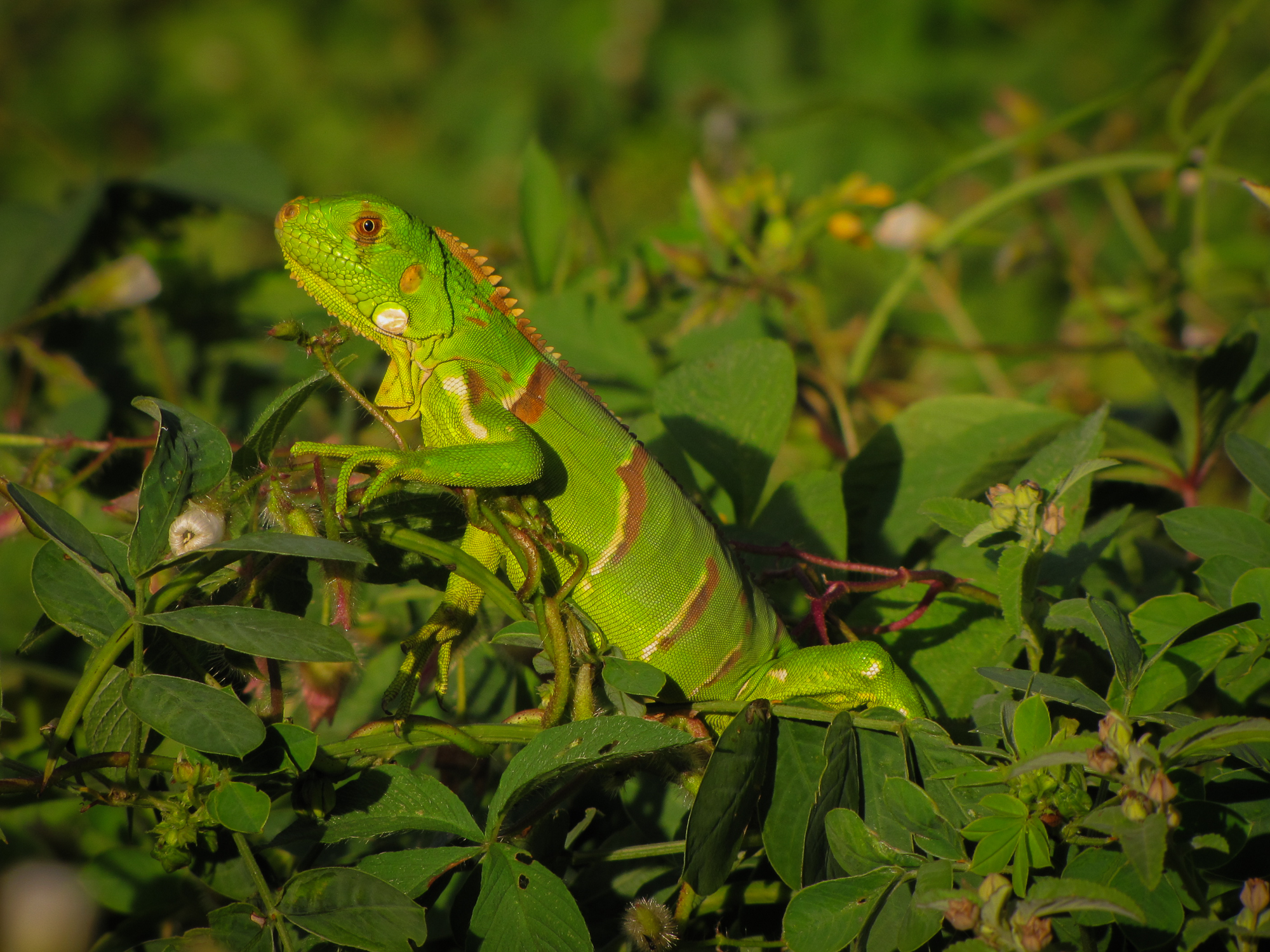
Green iguana in Brejo da Madre de Deus

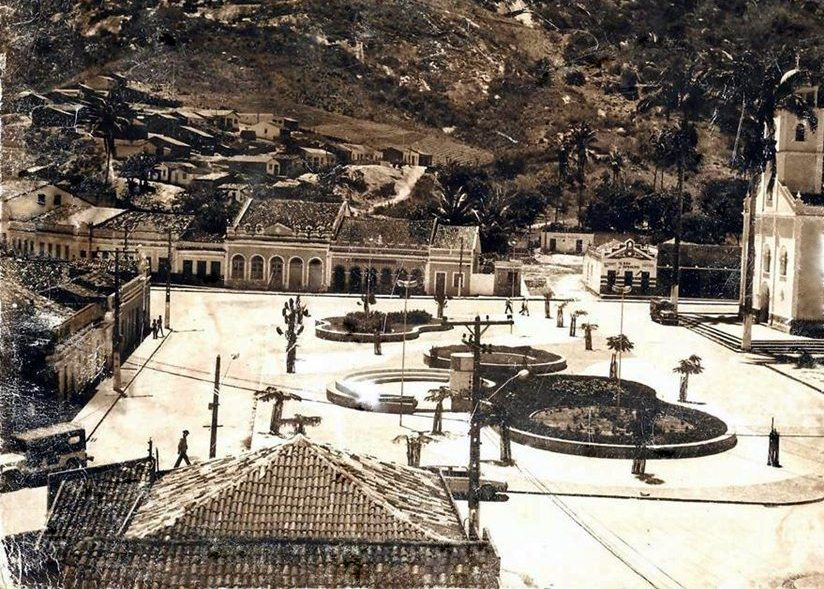
Historial Bom Conselho Plaza

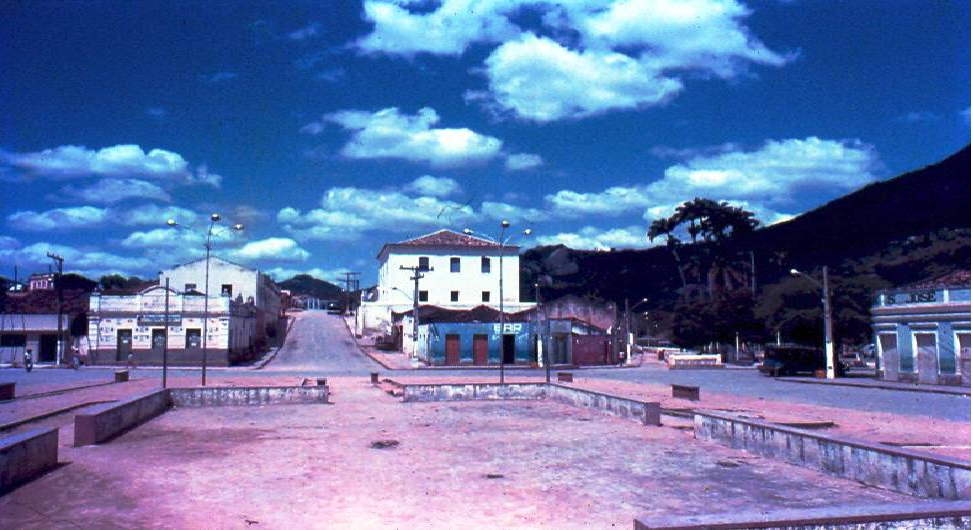
Brejo da Madre de Deus in 1978

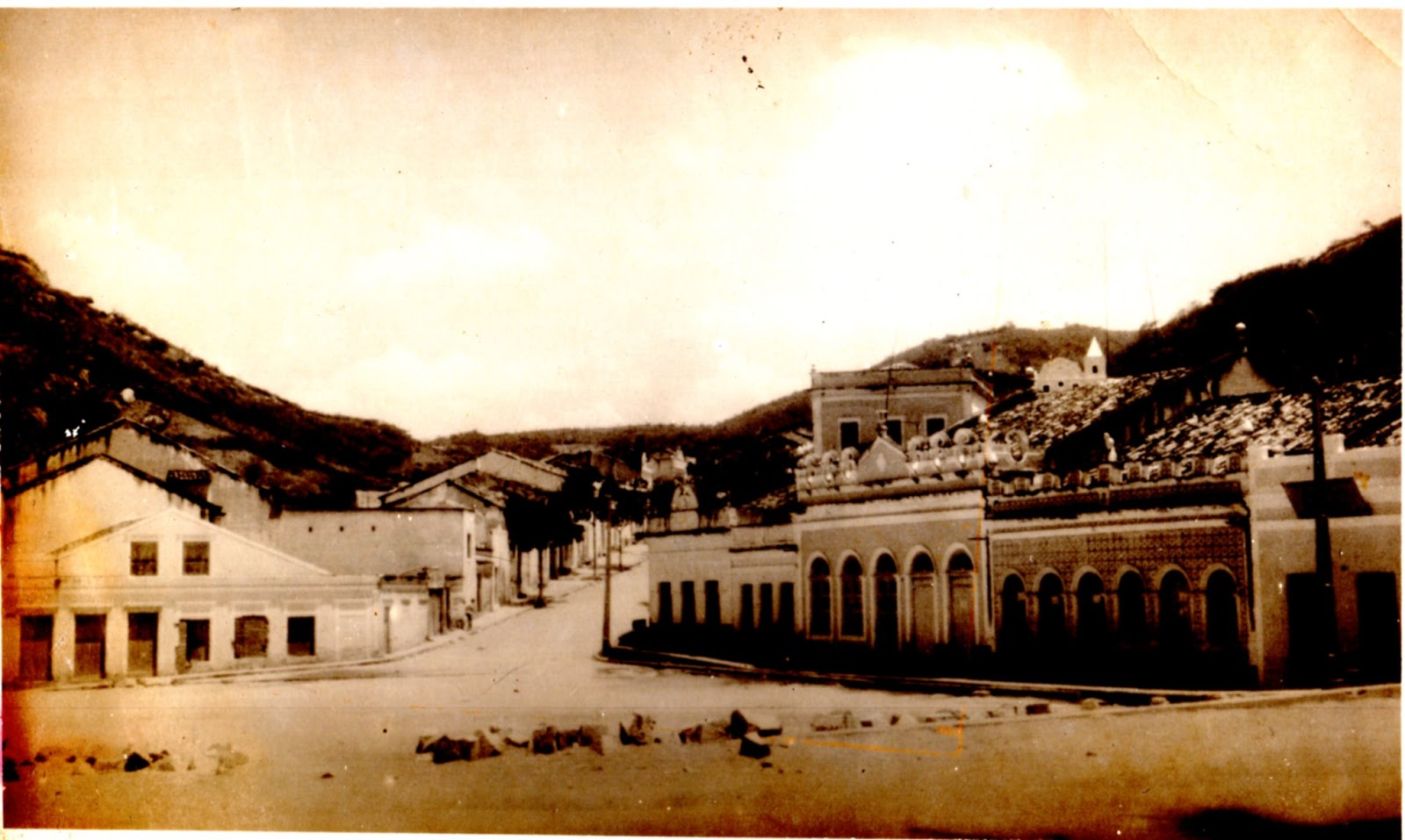
Brejo da Madre de Deus in the 1950s

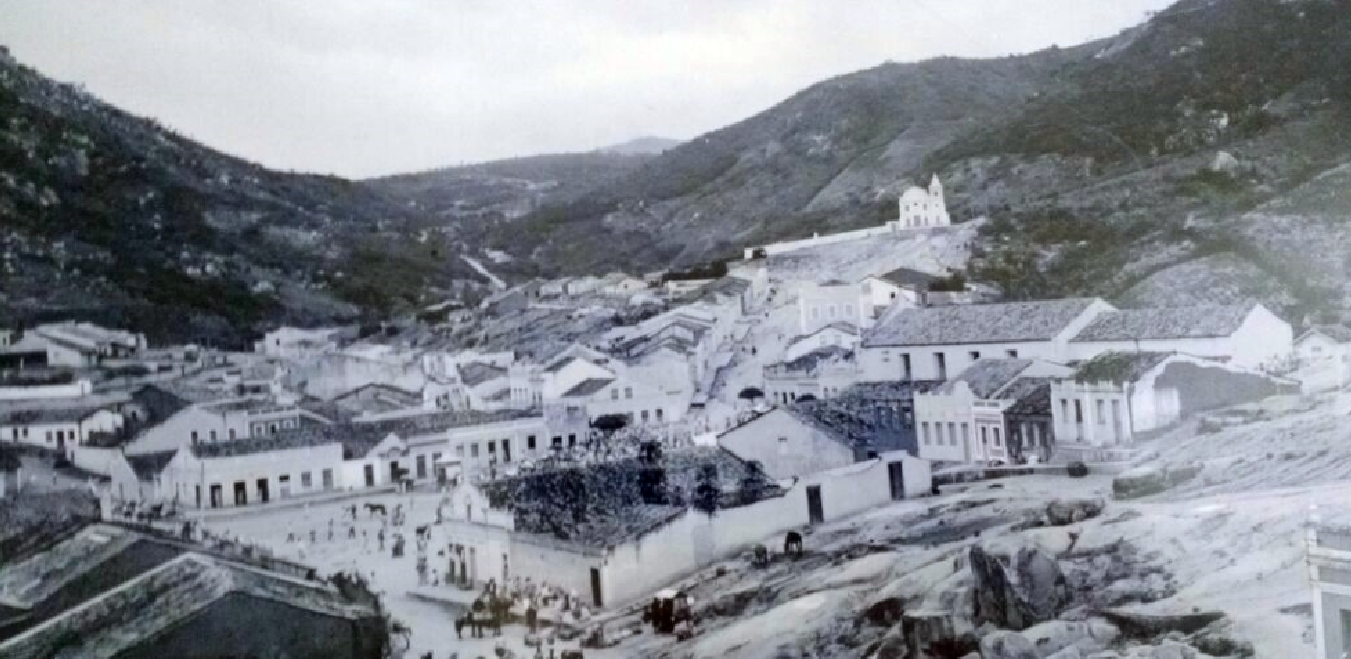
Brejo da Madre de Deus, circa 1940

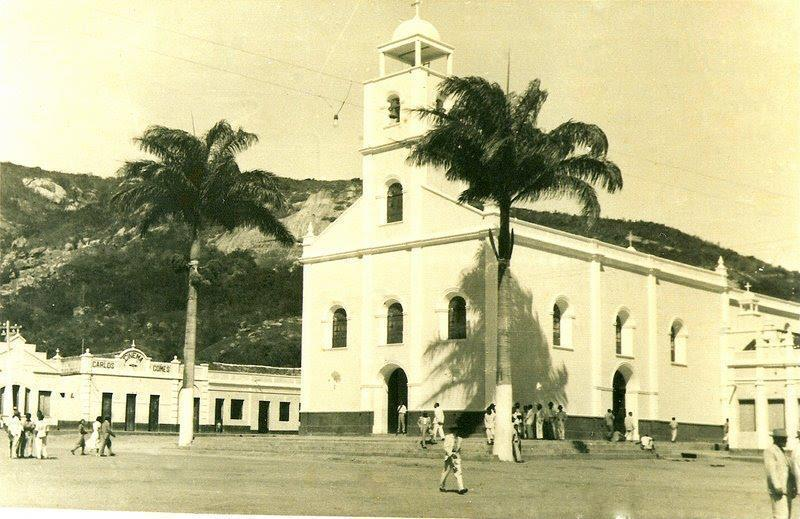
Our Lady of Good Counsel parish church in the first half of the 20th century

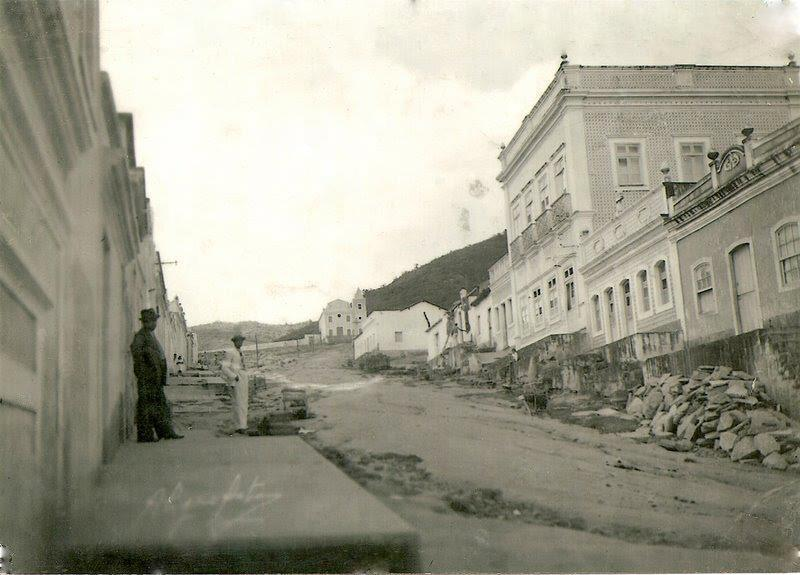
St. Joseph Street in the first half of the 20th century

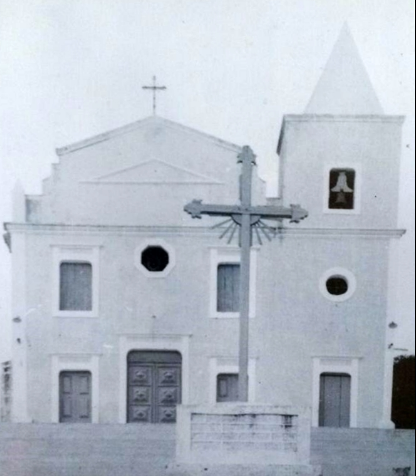
Saint Joseph parish church, circa 1950

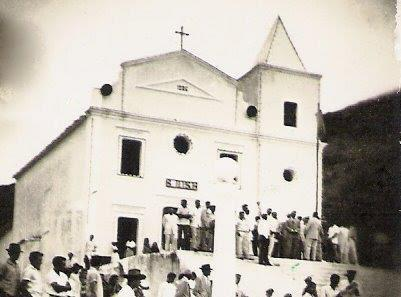
Saint Joseph parish church in the first half of the 20th century

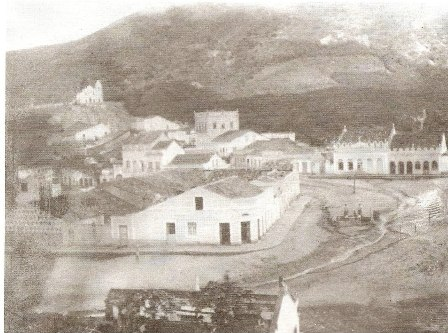
Historical Brejo da Madre de Deus

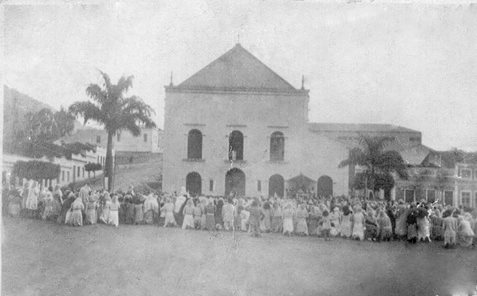
Historical Bom Conselho Church

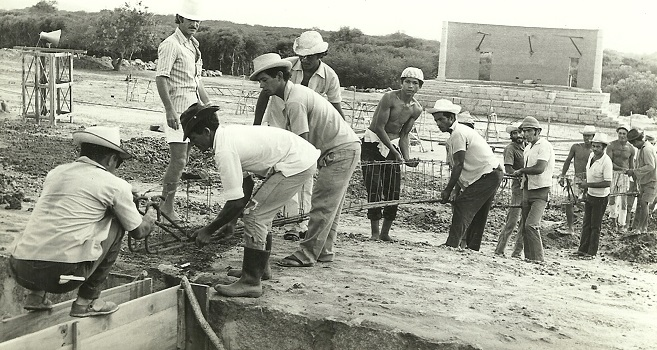
Passion of Christ in New Jerusalem theater under construction

== See also ==
- List of municipalities in Pernambuco
