= Jataúba =

City in Pernambuco, Brazil

- Municipality of Pernambuco, Brazil
- Location of Jataúba in Pernambuco

- Location within Brazil Location within South America
- Coordinates: 7°59′24″S 36°29′45″W
- Country: Brazil
- Region: Northeast
- State: Pernambuco
- Founded: 2 March 1962

Government
  - Mayor: Cátia Junsara Rodrigues Aquilino (PP) (2025-2028)
  - Vice Mayor: Fernando Chaves Costa (PSDB) (2025-2028)

Area
  - Total: 714.601 km^{2} (275.909 sq mi)
- Elevation: 516 m (1,693 ft)

Population (2022 Census)
  - Total: 15,843
  - Estimate (2025): 16,328
  - Density: 22.17/km^{2} (57.4/sq mi)
- Demonym: Jataubense (Brazilian Portuguese)
- Time zone: UTC-03:00 (Brasília Time)
- Postal code: 55180-000, 55185-000
- HDI (2010): 0.530 – low
- Website: jatauba.pe.gov.br

Jataúba (Central northeastern portuguese pronunciation: [ʒɐtɐˈubɐ]) is a city in the Brazilian state of Pernambuco.

== Geography ==
- State - Pernambuco
- Region - Agreste Pernambucano
- Boundaries - Paraíba state (N); Belo Jardim (S); Brejo da Madre de Deus and Santa Cruz do Capibaribe (E); Poção and Paraíba (W)
- Area - 719.22 km^{2}
- Elevation - 516 m
- Hydrography - Capibaribe River
- Vegetation - Caatinga Hipoxerófila
- Clima - semi-arid, hot
- Annual average temperature - 22.7 c
- Distance to Recife - 225 km
- Population - 16,328 (2025)

== Economy ==
The main economic activities in Jataúba are based in commerce and agribusiness, especially the raising of goats, cattle, sheep and pigs.

=== Economic indicators ===
Population	GDP x(1000 R$).	GDP pc (R$)	PE
15.365	46.176	3.117	0.07%

Economy by sector 2006

Primary sector	Secondary sector	Service sector
11.03%	8.07%	80.90%

=== Health indicators ===
HDI (2000)	Hospitals (2007)	Hospitals beds (2007)	Children's mortality every 1000 (2005)
0.583	1	13	25.7

== See also ==
- List of municipalities in Pernambuco
