= Santa Cruz do Capibaribe =

Municipality of Pernambuco, Brazil

Santa Cruz do Capibaribe Cidade de Santa Cruz do Capibaribe
- City
- Santa Cruz City
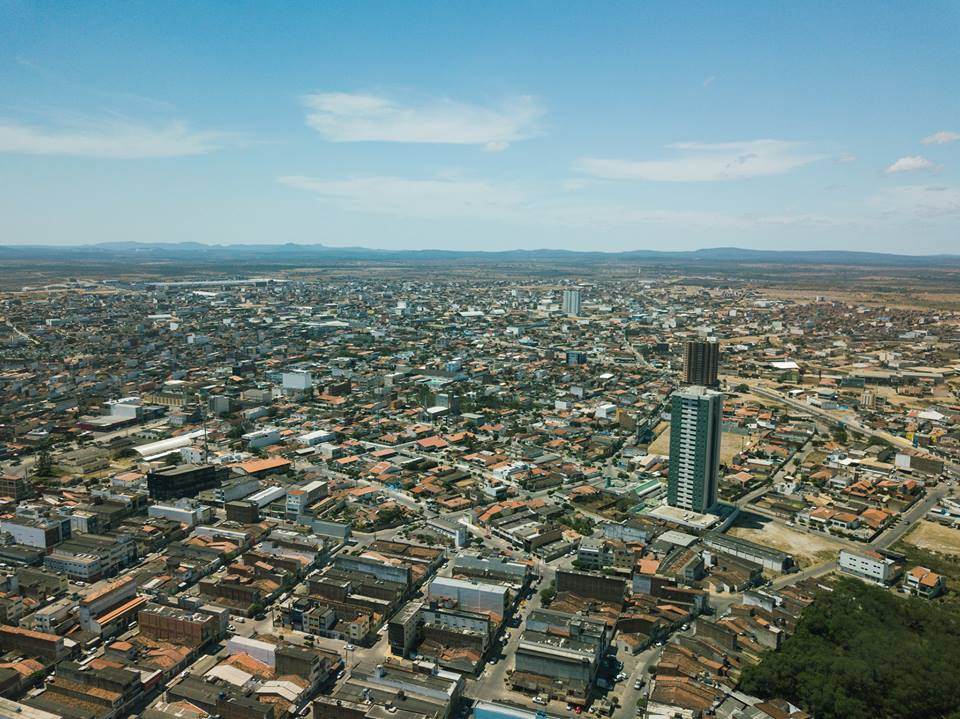
- Santa Cruz do Capibaribe in 2017

- Flag Coat of arms

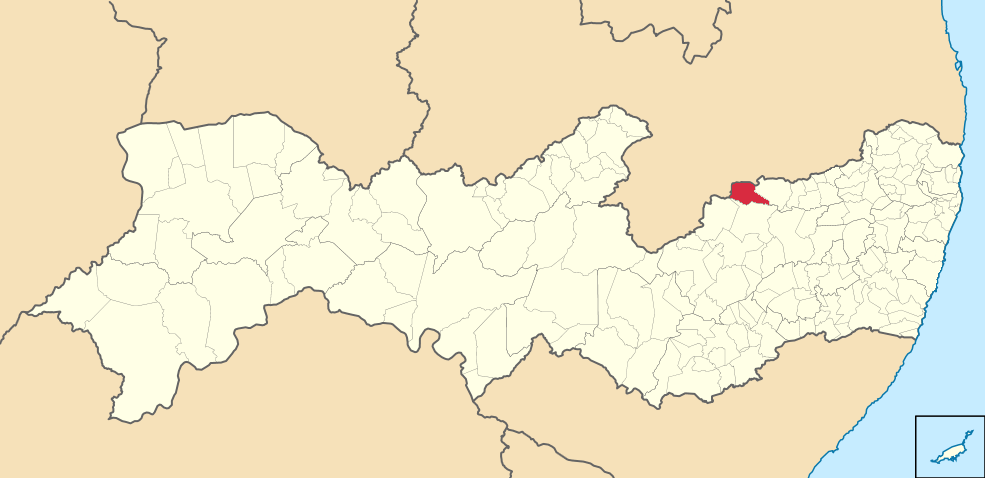

- Location within Brazil
- Coordinates: 07°57′25″S 36°12′18″W
- Country: Brazil
- Region: Northeast
- State: Pernambuco
- Founded: December 29, 1953

Government
  - Mayor: Fábio Queiroz Aragão

Area
  - City: 335.309 km^{2} (129.464 sq mi)
- Elevation: 438 m (1,437 ft)

Population (2025)
  - City: 104,854
  - Estimate: 133,355
  - Density: 312.709/km^{2} (809.911/sq mi)
  - Urban: 125,000
- Time zone: UTC−3 (BRT)
- Postal code: 55190-000
- Area code: +55 81
- HDI (2010): 0.648 – medium
- Website: www.santacruzdocapibaribe.pe.gov.br//

Santa Cruz do Capibaribe (Central northeastern portuguese pronunciation: [ˈsɐ̃tɐ ˈkɾujs ˈdu kapibɐˈɾibi]) is a Brazilian municipality in the State of Pernambuco. It is the third largest city in the mesoregion of Agreste of Pernambuco with a population of 104,854 inhabitants in 2025. It has 335.309 km^{2} (208.5 square miles) of total area and it is located about 185.7 km (115.4 miles) from the capital Recife.

The city is famous for its textile industry together with Caruaru.

== Geography ==
- State - Pernambuco
- Region - Agreste of Pernambuco
- Boundaries - Brejo da Madre de Deus and Jataúba (S), Taquaritinga do Norte (E), Paraíba (N and W).
- Area - 335.5 km^{2}
- Elevation - 438 m
- Hydrography - Capibaribe River
- Vegetation - Caatinga hipoxerofila.
- Climate - Semi desertic
- Annual average temperature - 23.4 c
- Main road - BR 203, BR 104 and PE 130
- Distance to Recife - 185 km

== Economy ==
The main economic activities in Santa Cruz do Capibaribe are related with the textile industry (employs 41%) and general commerce.

=== Economic Indicators ===
Population	GDP x(1000 R$).	GDP pc (R$)	PE
105.761	332.112	12.286	0.55%

Economy by Sector 2006

Primary sector	Secondary sector	Service sector
1.14%	14.44%	84.42%

=== Health Indicators ===
HDI (2010)	Hospitals (2007)	Hospitals beds (2007)	Children's Mortality every 1000 (2005)
0.648	3	115	22.5

== See also ==
- List of municipalities in Pernambuco
