= Poção =

City in Pernambuco, Brazil

- Municipality of Pernambuco, Brazil
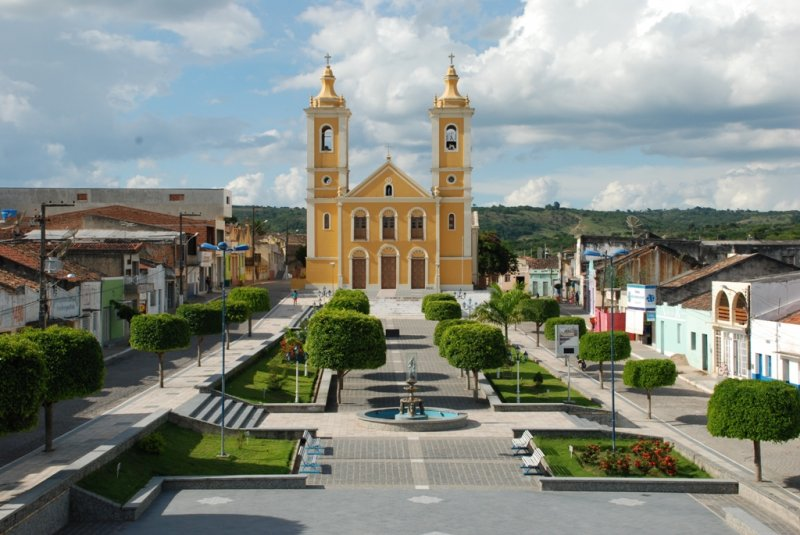
- Monsignor Stanislau Ferreira de Carvalho Plaza and the Church of Our Lady of Sorrows in Poção

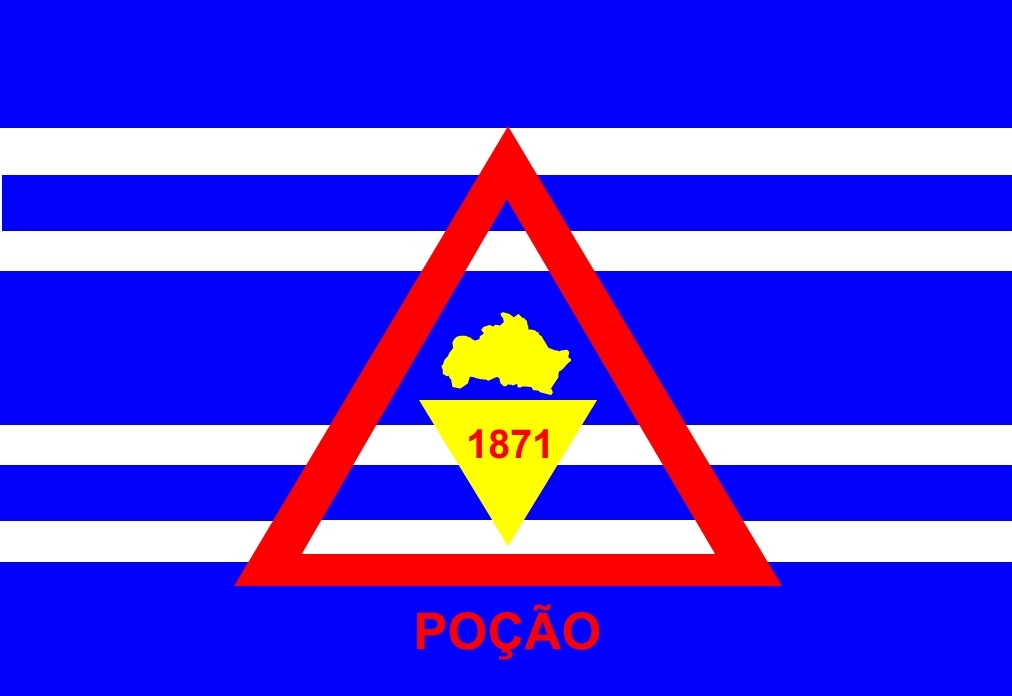
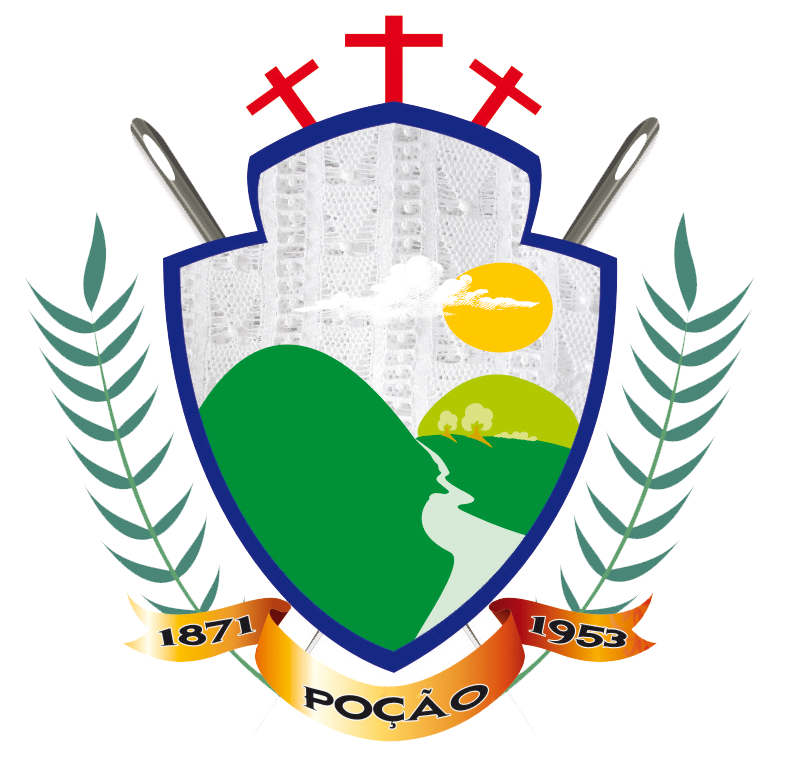
- Flag Coat of arms

- Location of Poção in Pernambuco

- Location within Brazil Location within South America
- Coordinates: 8°11′9″S 36°42′18″W
- Country: Brazil
- Region: Northeast
- State: Pernambuco
- Founded: 30 December 1953

Government
  - Mayor: Joao Guilherme Vasconcelos de Sousa (MDB) (2025-2028)
  - Vice Mayor: Cláudio Antônio Patriota Duarte (PP) (2025-2028)

Area
  - Total: 205.119 km^{2} (79.197 sq mi)
- Elevation: 1,000 m (3,300 ft)

Population (2022 Census)
  - Total: 10,500
  - Estimate (2025): 10,792
  - Density: 51.19/km^{2} (132.6/sq mi)
- Demonym: Poçãoense (Brazilian Portuguese)
- Time zone: UTC-03:00 (Brasília Time)
- Postal code: 55240-000, 55245-000
- HDI (2010): 0.528 – low
- Website: pocao.pe.gov.br

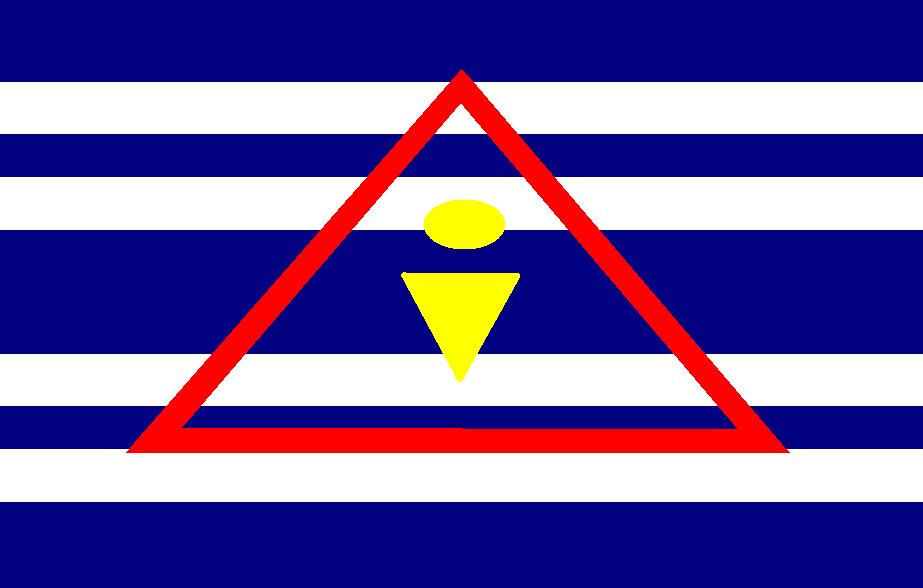
Poção Flag

Poção (Central northeastern portuguese pronunciation: [pɔˈsɐ̃w]) is a city located in the state of Pernambuco, Brazil. Located at 241 km away from Recife, capital of the state of Pernambuco. Has an estimated (IBGE 2020) population of 11,305 inhabitants.

== Geography ==
- State - Pernambuco
- Region - Agreste Pernambucano
- Boundaries - Paraíba state (N); Pesqueira (S and W); Jataúba (E).
- Area - 199.74 km^{2}
- Elevation - 1000 m
- Hydrography - Capibaribe and Ipojuca rivers
- Vegetation - Caatinga Hipoxerófila
- Climate - Semi arid
- Annual average temperature - 19.5 c
- Distance to Recife - 241 km

== Economy ==
The main economic activities in Poção are based in agribusiness, especially beans, corn; and livestock such as cattle, sheep, goats and poultry.

=== Economic indicators ===
Population	GDP x(1000 R$).	GDP pc (R$)	PE
11.503	35.978	3.231	0.07%

Economy by Sector 2006

Primary sector	Secondary sector	Service sector
10.72%	8.83%	80.45%

=== Health indicators ===
HDI (2000)	Hospitals (2007)	Hospitals beds (2007)	Children's Mortality every 1000 (2005)
0.571	1	14	22.9

== See also ==
- List of municipalities in Pernambuco
