= Calçado =

City in Pernambuco, Brazil

- Municipality of Pernambuco, Brazil
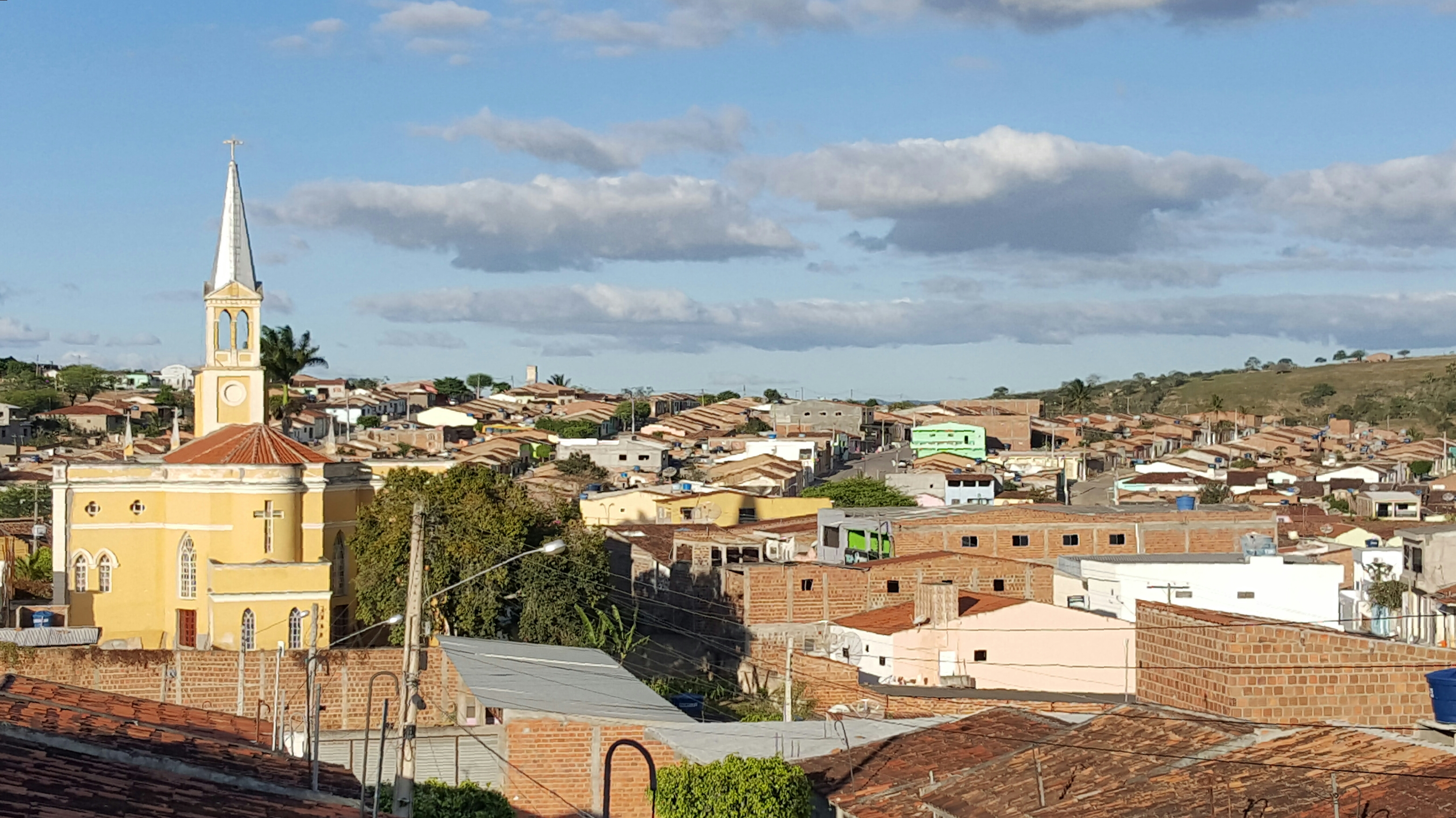
- View of Calçado with Our Lady of Lourdes church

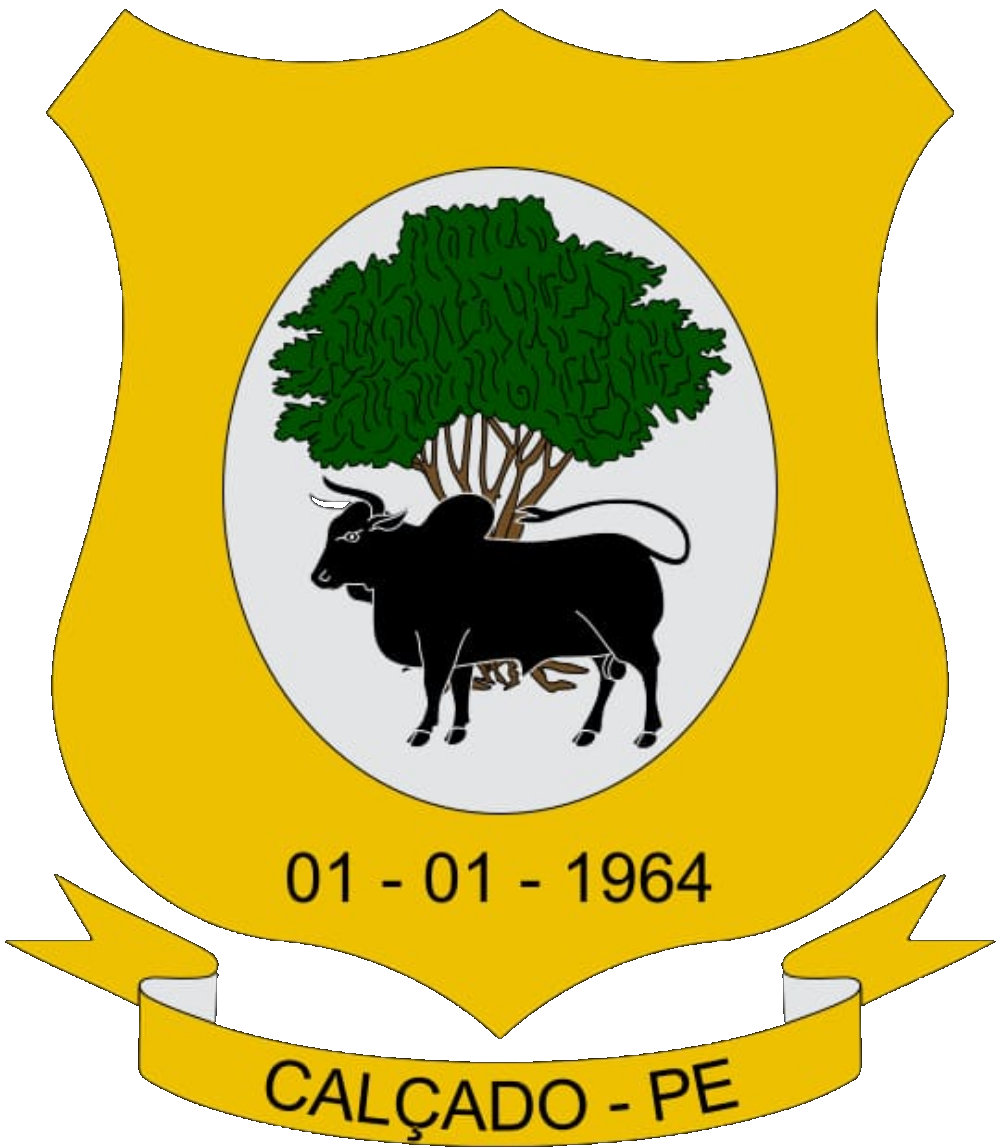
- Flag Coat of arms

- Location of Calçado in Pernambuco

- Location within Brazil Location within South America
- Coordinates: 8°44′31″S 36°20′2″W
- Country: Brazil
- Region: Northeast
- State: Pernambuco
- Founded: 22 February 1964

Government
  - Mayor: José Elias Macena de Lima Filho (PP) (2025-2028)
  - Vice Mayor: Marcone Ferreira da Silva (PP) (2025-2028)

Area
  - Total: 121.435 km^{2} (46.886 sq mi)
- Elevation: 643 m (2,110 ft)

Population (2022 Census)
  - Total: 11,093
  - Estimate (2025): 11,453
  - Density: 90.97/km^{2} (235.6/sq mi)
- Demonym: Calçadense (Brazilian Portuguese)
- Time zone: UTC-03:00 (Brasília Time)
- Postal code: 55375-000
- HDI (2010): 0.566 – medium
- Website: calcado.pe.gov.br

Calçado (Central northeastern portuguese pronunciation: [kɐwˈsadu]) is a city located in the state of Pernambuco, Brazil. Located at 200 km away from Recife, capital of the state of Pernambuco. Has an estimated (2022 Census) population of 11,093 inhabitants.

== Geography ==
- State - Pernambuco
- Region - Agreste Pernambucano
- Boundaries - Lajedo (N and E); Canhotinho (S); Angelim and Jupi (W)
- Area - 423.08 km^{2}
- Elevation - 643 m
- Hydrography - Mundaú and Una rivers
- Vegetation - Caatinga Hiperxerófila
- Clima - Hot and humid
- Annual average temperature - 22.1 c
- Distance to Recife - 200 km

== Economy ==
The main economic activities in Calçado are based in agribusiness, especially manioc, beans; and livestock such as cattle, sheep and poultry.

=== Economic indicators ===
| Population | GDP x(1000 R$). | GDP pc (R$) | PE |
|---|---|---|---|
| 11.619 | 40.140 | 3.541 | 0.07% |

Economy by Sector 2006

| Primary sector | Secondary sector | Service sector |
|---|---|---|
| 26.76% | 6.86% | 66.38% |

=== Health indicators ===
| HDI (2000) | Hospitals (2007) | Hospitals beds (2007) | Children's Mortality every 1000 (2005) |
|---|---|---|---|
| 0.582 | 1 | 13 | 38.5 |

== See also ==
- List of municipalities in Pernambuco
