= Jucati =

City in Pernambuco, Brazil

- Municipality of Pernambuco, Brazil
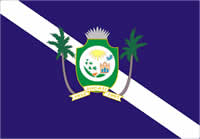
- Flag

- Location of Jucati in Pernambuco

- Location within Brazil Location within South America
- Coordinates: 8°42′21″S 36°29′20″W
- Country: Brazil
- Region: Northeast
- State: Pernambuco
- Founded: 1 January 1991

Government
  - Mayor: Clelson Luis Aparecido de Melo (Republicanos) (2025-2028)
  - Vice Mayor: Moises Cordeiro Vilela (PT) (2025-2028)

Area
  - Total: 120.167 km^{2} (46.397 sq mi)
- Elevation: 820 m (2,690 ft)

Population (2022 Census)
  - Total: 11,517
  - Estimate (2025): 12,023
  - Density: 95.56/km^{2} (247.5/sq mi)
- Demonym: Jucatiense (Brazilian Portuguese)
- Time zone: UTC-03:00 (Brasília Time)
- Postal code: 55398-000, 55399-000
- HDI (2010): 0.550 – medium
- Website: jucati.pe.gov.br

Jucati (Central northeastern portuguese pronunciation: [ʒukaˈti]) is a city located in the state of Pernambuco, Brazil. It is located 217 km away from Recife, the capital of Pernambuco. As of the 2022 census, it had a population of 11,517.

== Geography ==
- State - Pernambuco
- Region - Agreste Pernambucano
- Boundaries - São Bento do Una (N); Garanhuns and São João (S); Jupi (E); Capoeiras (W)
- Area - 120.65 km^{2}
- Elevation - 820 m
- Hydrography - Una and Mundaú rivers
- Vegetation - Caatinga Hiperxerófila
- Clima - Hot and Humid
- Annual average temperature - 20.8 c
- Distance to Recife - 217.6 km

== Economy ==
The main economic activities in Jucati are based in food & beverage industry, commerce and agribusiness, especially manioc, beans; and livestock such as cattle and poultry.

=== Economic indicators ===
Population	GDP x(1000 R$).	GDP pc (R$)	PE
11.086	37.452	3.567	0.06%

Economy by Sector 2006

Primary sector	Secondary sector	Service sector
20.33%	7.64%	72.03%

=== Health indicators ===
HDI (2000)	Hospitals (2007)	Hospitals beds (2007)	Children's Mortality every 1000 (2005)
0.553	---	---	30.7

== See also ==
- List of municipalities in Pernambuco
