= São João, Pernambuco =

City in Pernambuco, Brazil

São João
- Municipality of Pernambuco, Brazil
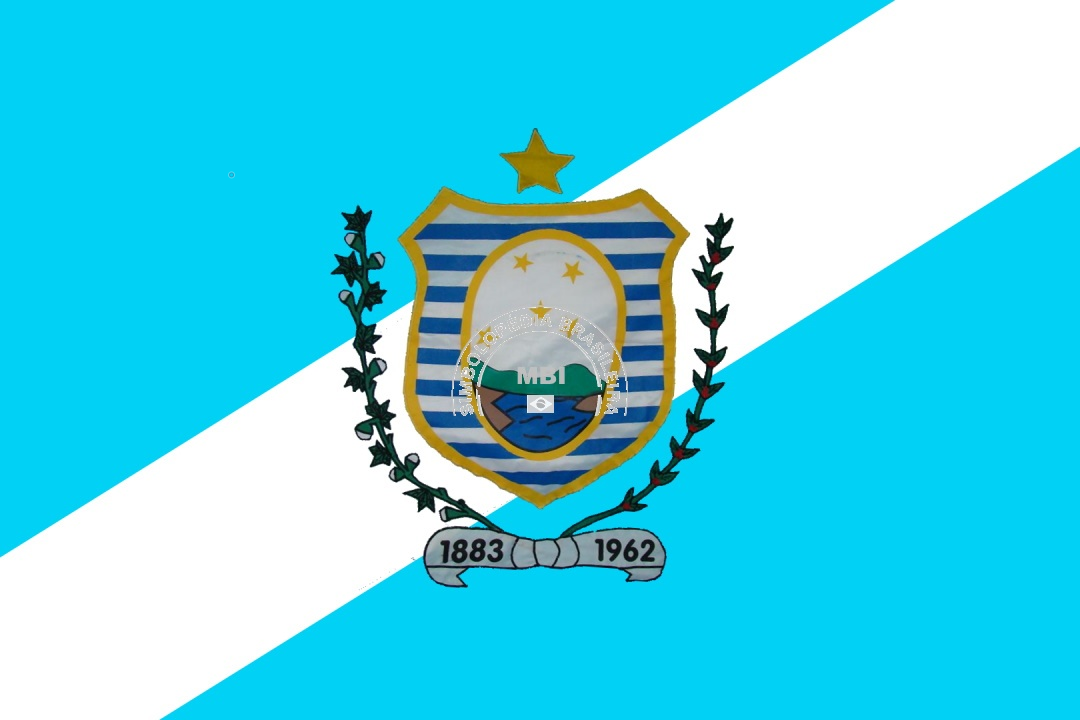
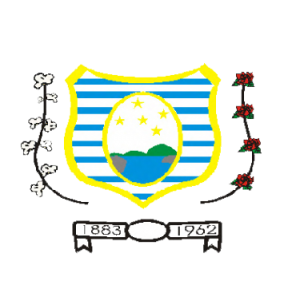
- Flag Coat of arms

- Location of São João in Pernambuco

- Location within Brazil Location within South America
- Coordinates: 8°52′33″S 36°22′1″W
- Country: Brazil
- Region: Northeast
- State: Pernambuco
- Founded: 25 November 1958

Government
  - Mayor: Jose Wilson Ferreira de Lima (PP) (2025-2028)
  - Vice Mayor: Jucelio Marinho da Silva (PSDB) (2025-2028)

Area
  - Total: 258.443 km^{2} (99.785 sq mi)
- Elevation: 716 m (2,349 ft)

Population (2022 Census)
  - Total: 23,837
  - Estimate (2025): 24,895
  - Density: 92.21/km^{2} (238.8/sq mi)
- Demonym: São-joanense (Brazilian Portuguese)
- Time zone: UTC-03:00 (Brasília Time)
- Postal code: 55435-000
- HDI (2010): 0.570 – medium
- Website: saojoao.pe.gov.br

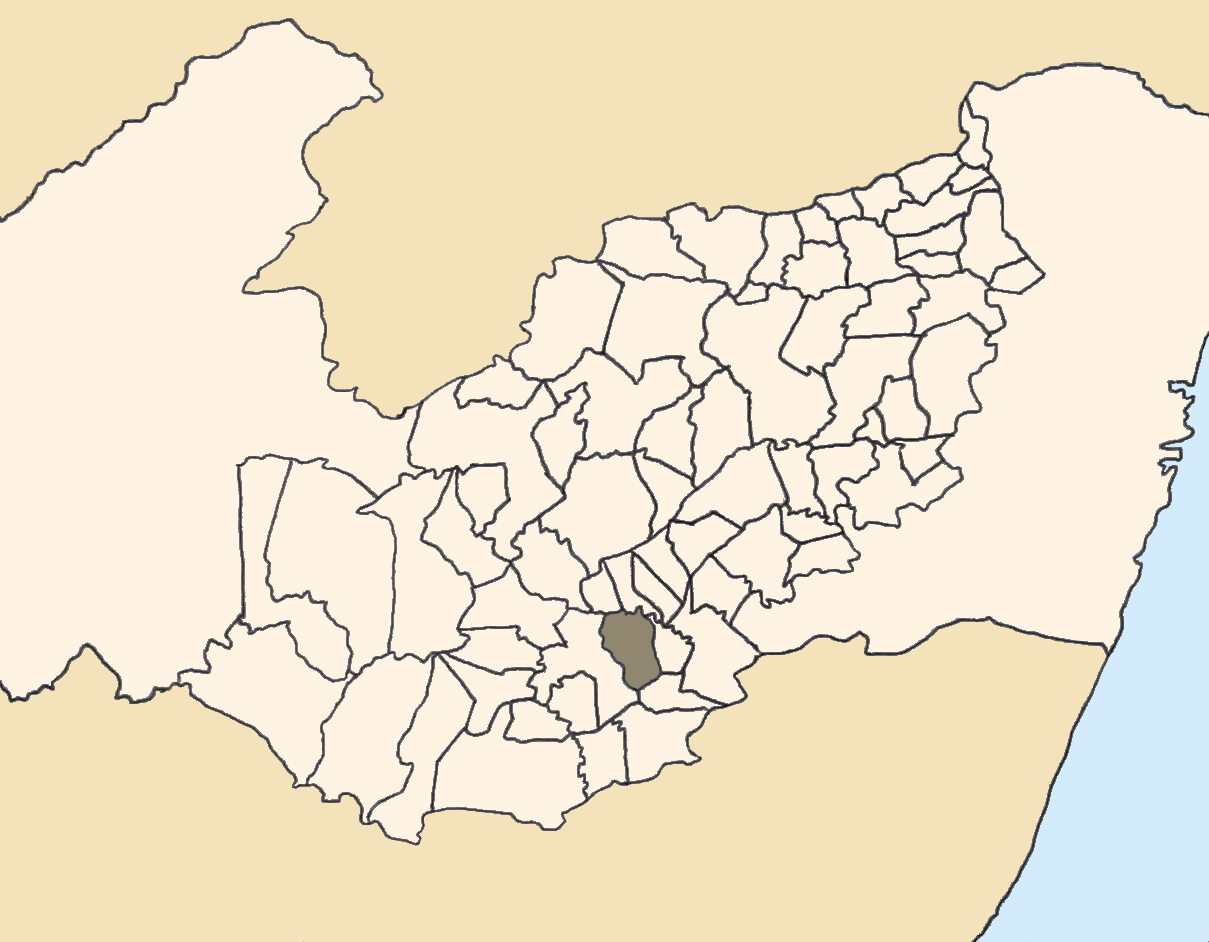
Location of São João within Pernambuco.

São João (Central northeastern portuguese pronunciation: [ˈsɐ̃w ˈʒuɐ̃w]) is a city located in the state of Pernambuco, Brazil. Located at 240 km away from Recife, capital of the state of Pernambuco. Has an estimated (IBGE 2020) population of 22,899 inhabitants.

== Geography ==
- State - Pernambuco
- Region - Agreste Pernambucano
- Boundaries - Jupi and Jucati (N); Palmeirina (S); Angelim (E); Garanhuns (W).
- Area - 244.44 km^{2}
- Elevation - 716 m
- Hydrography - Mundaú River
- Vegetation - Caatinga Hiperxerófila
- Climate - Tropical hot and humid
- Annual average temperature - 21.4 c
- Distance to Recife - 240 km

== Economy ==
The main economic activities in São João are based in agribusiness, especially beans, manioc; and livestock such as cattle, sheep and chickens.

=== Economic indicators ===
Population	GDP x(1000 R$).	GDP pc (R$)	PE
22.287	73.978	3.521	0.12%

Economy by Sector 2006

Primary sector	Secondary sector	Service sector
24.35%	7.50%	68.15%

=== Health indicators ===
HDI (2000)	Hospitals (2007)	Hospitals beds (2007)	Children's Mortality every 1000 (2005)
0.593	1	39	25.8

== See also ==
- List of municipalities in Pernambuco
