= Jurema, Pernambuco =

Municipality in Pernambuco, Brazil

Jurema
- Municipality of Pernambuco, Brazil
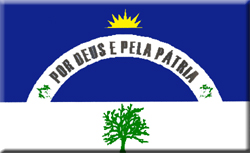
- Flag Coat of arms
- Etymology: Derived from the Tupi-Guarani language, meaning "fetid thorn"
- Motto(s): Brazilian Portuguese: Por Deus e pela Pátria; English: For God and Country
- Location of Jurema in Pernambuco

- Location within Brazil Location within South America
- Coordinates: 8°43′4″S 36°8′9″W
- Country: Brazil
- Region: Northeast
- State: Pernambuco
- Founded: 11 September 1928

Government
  - Mayor: Edvaldo Marcos Ramos Ferreira (PT) (2025-2028)
  - Vice Mayor: José Osmar Vilela (Republicanos) (2025-2028)

Area
  - Total: 148.254 km^{2} (57.241 sq mi)
- Elevation: 723 m (2,372 ft)

Population (2022 Census)
  - Total: 13,648
  - Estimate (2025): 14,002
  - Density: 92.06/km^{2} (238.4/sq mi)
- Demonym: Juremense (Brazilian Portuguese)
- Time zone: UTC-03:00 (Brasília Time)
- Postal code: 55480-000, 55485-000
- HDI (2010): 0.509 – low
- Website: jurema.pe.gov.br

Jurema (Central northeastern portuguese pronunciation: [ʒuˈɾẽmɐ]) is a municipality/city in the state of Pernambuco in Brazil. The population in 2020, according with IBGE was 15,431 inhabitants and the total area is 148.25 km^{2}.

== Geography ==
- State - Pernambuco
- Region - Agreste of Pernambuco
- Boundaries - Panelas (N); Canhotinho (S); Quipapá (E); Ibirajuba (W).
- Area - 148.25 km^{2}
- Elevation - 723 m
- Hydrography - Mundaú and Una rivers
- Vegetation - Subperenifólia forest
- Clima - Hot and humid
- Annual average temperature - 21.9 c
- Distance to Recife - 204 km

== Economy ==
The main economic activities in Jurema are related with agribusiness, especially creations of cattle, goats, sheep, chickens; and plantations of manioc and beans.

=== Economic Indicators ===
Population	GDP x(1000 R$).	GDP pc (R$)	PE
15.552	47.780	3.237	0.08%

Economy by Sector 2006

Primary sector	Secondary sector	Service sector
20.07%	8.03%	71.90%

=== Health Indicators ===
HDI (2000)	Hospitals (2007)	Hospitals beds (2007)	Children's Mortality every 1000 (2005)
0.550	1	11	39.9

== See also ==
- List of municipalities in Pernambuco
