= Quipapá =

Municipality of Pernambuco, Brazil

- Municipality of Pernambuco, Brazil
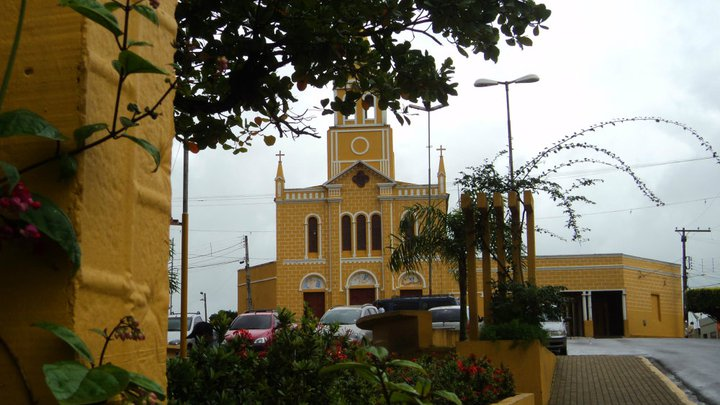
- Our Lady of Conception Parish church

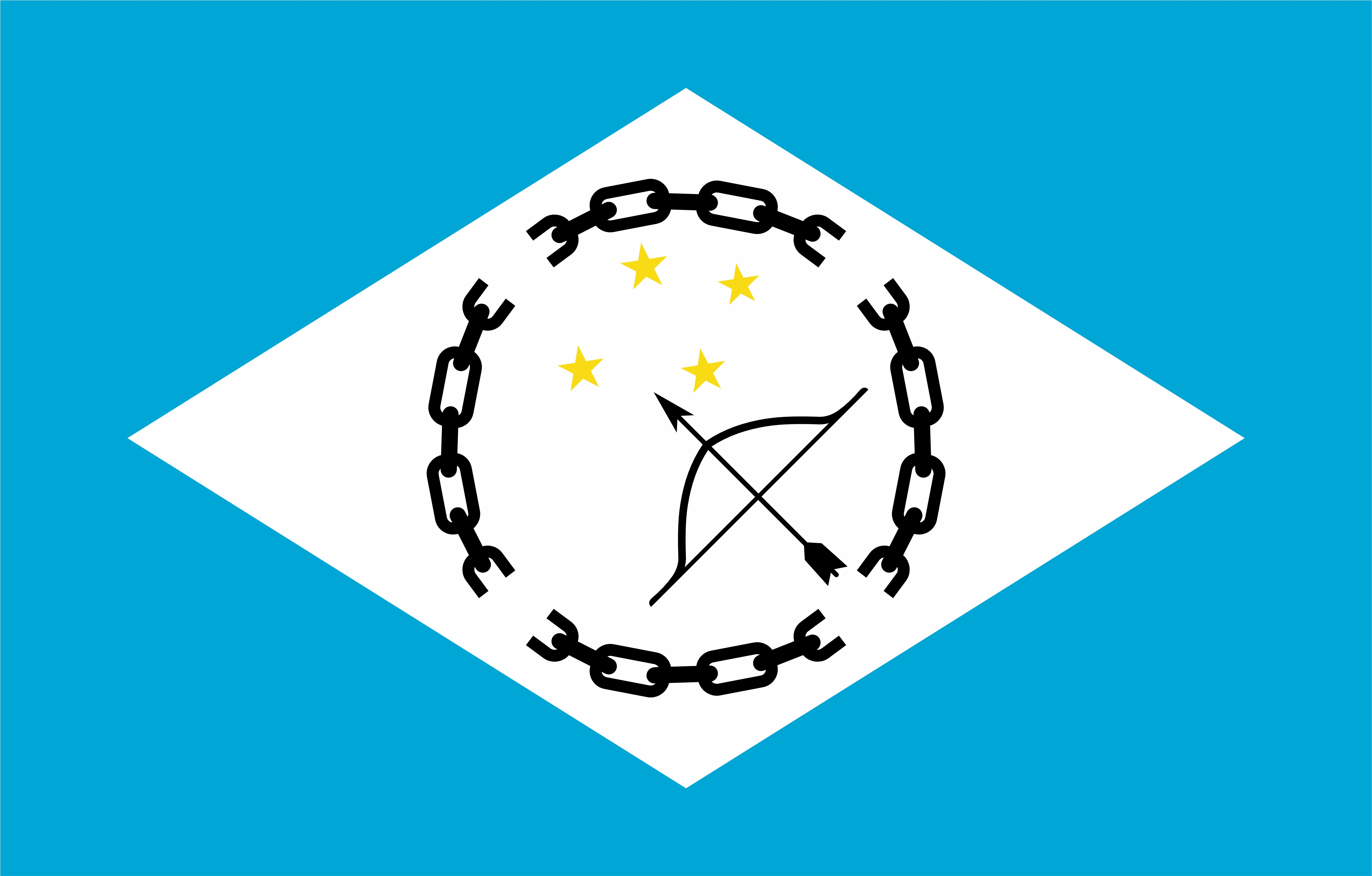
- Flag

- Location of Quipapá in Pernambuco

- Location within Brazil Location within South America
- Coordinates: 8°49′40″S 36°0′42″W
- Country: Brazil
- Region: Northeast
- State: Pernambuco
- Founded: 12 May 1879

Government
  - Mayor: Genivaldo Temoteo Bezerra (Republicanos) (2025-2028)
  - Vice Mayor: João Batista Brazil dos Santos (PSB) (2025-2028)

Area
  - Total: 230.617 km^{2} (89.042 sq mi)
- Elevation: 462 m (1,516 ft)

Population (2022 Census)
  - Total: 17,928
  - Estimate (2025): 17,731
  - Density: 77.74/km^{2} (201.3/sq mi)
- Demonym: Quipapaense (Brazilian Portuguese)
- Time zone: UTC-03:00 (Brasília Time)
- Postal code: 55415-000, 55418-000
- HDI (2010): 0.552 – medium
- Website: quipapa.pe.gov.br

Quipapá (Central northeastern portuguese pronunciation: [kipɐˈpa]) is a city located in the state of Pernambuco, Brazil. Located at 186 km away from Recife, capital of the state of Pernambuco. Has an estimated (IBGE 2025) population of 17,731 inhabitants.

== Geography ==
- State - Pernambuco
- Region - Zona da mata Pernambucana
- Boundaries - Panelas (N); Alagoas state (S); São Benedito do Sul (E); Canhotinho and Jurema (W)
- Area - 230.61 km^{2}
- Elevation - 462 m
- Hydrography - Una and Mundaú rivers
- Vegetation - Subperenifólia forest
- Clima - Hot tropical and humid
- Annual average temperature - 22.9 c
- Distance to Recife - 186 km

== Economy ==
The main economic activities in Quipapá are based in agribusiness, especially sugarcane, bananas, manioc; and livestock such as cattle, sheep and poultry.

=== Economic indicators ===
Population	GDP x(1000 R$).	GDP pc (R$)	PE
25.603	62.551	2.585	0.10%

Economy by Sector 2006

Primary sector	Secondary sector	Service sector
13.63%	9.06%	77.31%

=== Health indicators ===
HDI (2000)	Hospitals (2007)	Hospitals beds (2007)	Children's Mortality every 1000 (2005)
0.579	1	42	45.7

== See also ==
- List of municipalities in Pernambuco
