= Ibirajuba =

City in Pernambuco, Brazil

- Municipality
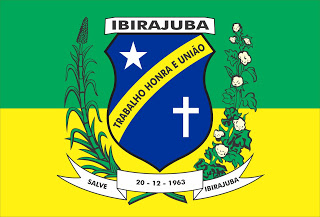
- Flag
- Etymology: Word of indigenous origin meaning "yellow tree"
- Motto(s): Portuguese: Trabalho, honra e união English: Work, honor, and unity
- Location of Ibirajuba in Pernambuco

- Location within Brazil Location within South America
- Coordinates: 8°34′40″S 36°10′40″W
- Country: Brazil
- Region: Northeast
- State: Pernambuco
- Founded: 20 December 1963

Government
  - Mayor: Maria Izalta Silva Lopes Gama (PSDB) (2025-2028)
  - Vice Mayor: Marcos Gomes da Cruz (PODE) (2025-2028)

Area
  - Total: 189.596 km^{2} (73.203 sq mi)
- Elevation: 612 m (2,008 ft)

Population (2022 Census)
  - Total: 7,140
  - Estimate (2025): 7,334
  - Density: 37.66/km^{2} (97.5/sq mi)
- Demonym: Ibirajubense (Brazilian Portuguese)
- Time zone: UTC-03:00 (Brasília Time)
- Postal code: 55390-000
- HDI (2010): 0.580 – medium
- Website: ibirajuba.pe.gov.br

Ibirajuba (Central northeastern portuguese pronunciation: [ibiɾɐˈʒubɐ]) is a city located in the state of Pernambuco, Brazil. Located 182 km away from Recife, the capital of the state of Pernambuco, it has an estimated (2022 Census) population of 7,140 inhabitants.

== Geography ==
- State – Pernambuco
- Region – Agreste Pernambucano
- Boundaries – Altinho and Cachoeirinha (N); Lajedo (S and W); Panelas and Jurema (E).
- Area – 189.59 km^{2}
- Elevation – 612 m
- Hydrography – Una River
- Vegetation – Caatinga Hipoxerófila
- Climate – Transition between tropical (Hot and humid) and, semi arid hot
- Annual average temperature – 22.0 c
- Distance to Recife – 182 km

== Economy ==
The main economic activities in Ibirajuba are based in commerce and agribusiness, especially corn, beans; and livestock such as cattle, sheep, pigs, goats and poultry.

=== Economic indicators ===
Population	GDP x(1000 R$).	GDP pc (R$)	PE
7.833	28.513	3.779	0.047%

Economy by Sector 2006

Primary sector	Secondary sector	Service sector
31.04%	7.30%	61.66%

=== Health indicators ===
HDI (2000)	Hospitals (2007)	Hospitals beds (2007)	Children's Mortality every 1000 (2005)
0.558	1	7	41.3

== See also ==
- List of municipalities in Pernambuco
