= Capoeiras =

Municipality of Pernambuco State, Brazil

- Municipality of Pernambuco, Brazil
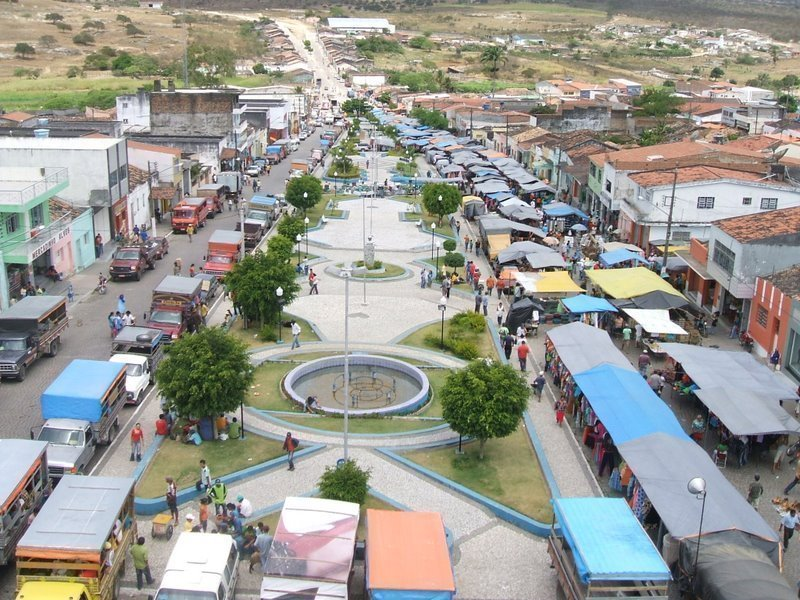
- Aerial view of Capoeiras

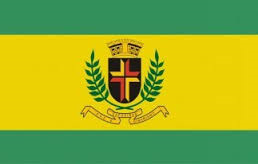
- Flag
- Etymology: Originated from Capoeirã, a word of indigenous origin, meaning "cold forest"
- Location of Capoeiras in Pernambuco

- Location within Brazil Location within South America
- Coordinates: 8°44′6″S 36°37′37″W
- Country: Brazil
- Region: Northeast
- State: Pernambuco
- Founded: 21 December 1963

Government
  - Mayor: Joaquim Costa Teixeira (PSB) (2025-2028)
  - Vice Mayor: Cícero Pereira da Silva (Republicanos) (2025-2028)

Area
  - Total: 337.108 km^{2} (130.158 sq mi)
- Elevation: 888 m (2,913 ft)

Population (2022 Census)
  - Total: 18,338
  - Estimate (2025): 18,854
  - Density: 54.39/km^{2} (140.9/sq mi)
- Demonym: Capoeirense (Brazilian Portuguese)
- Time zone: UTC-03:00 (Brasília Time)
- Postal code: 55365-000
- HDI (2010): 0.549 – low
- Website: capoeiras.pe.gov.br

Capoeiras (Central northeastern portuguese pronunciation: [kɐpuˈeɾɐ(s)]) is a city located in the state of Pernambuco, Brazil. Located at 252.7 km away from Recife, capital of the state of Pernambuco. Has an estimated (IBGE 2020) population of 20,048 inhabitants.

== Geography ==
- State - Pernambuco
- Region - Agreste Pernambucano
- Boundaries - São Bento do Una (N); Garanhuns (S); Jucati (E); Pesqueira and Caetés (W).
- Area - 335.26 km^{2}
- Elevation - 888 m
- Hydrography - Mundaú and Una rivers
- Vegetation - Caatinga Hiperxerófila
- Climate - Semi arid
- Annual average temperature - 20.4 c
- Distance to Recife - 252.7 km

== Economy ==
The main economic activities in Capoeiras are based in commerce and agribusiness, especially tomatoes, beans, manioc, corn; and livestock such as cattle, pigs, sheep and poultry.

=== Economic indicators ===
Population	GDP x(1000 R$).	GDP pc (R$)	PE
19.936	64.484	3.335	0.105%

Economy by Sector 2006

Primary sector	Secondary sector	Service sector
22.68%	7.53%	69.79%

=== Health indicators ===
HDI (2000)	Hospitals (2007)	Hospitals beds (2007)	Children's Mortality every 1000 (2005)
0.593	1	28	21.3

== See also ==
- List of municipalities in Pernambuco
