= Canhotinho =

City in Pernambuco, Brazil

- Municipality of Pernambuco, Brazil
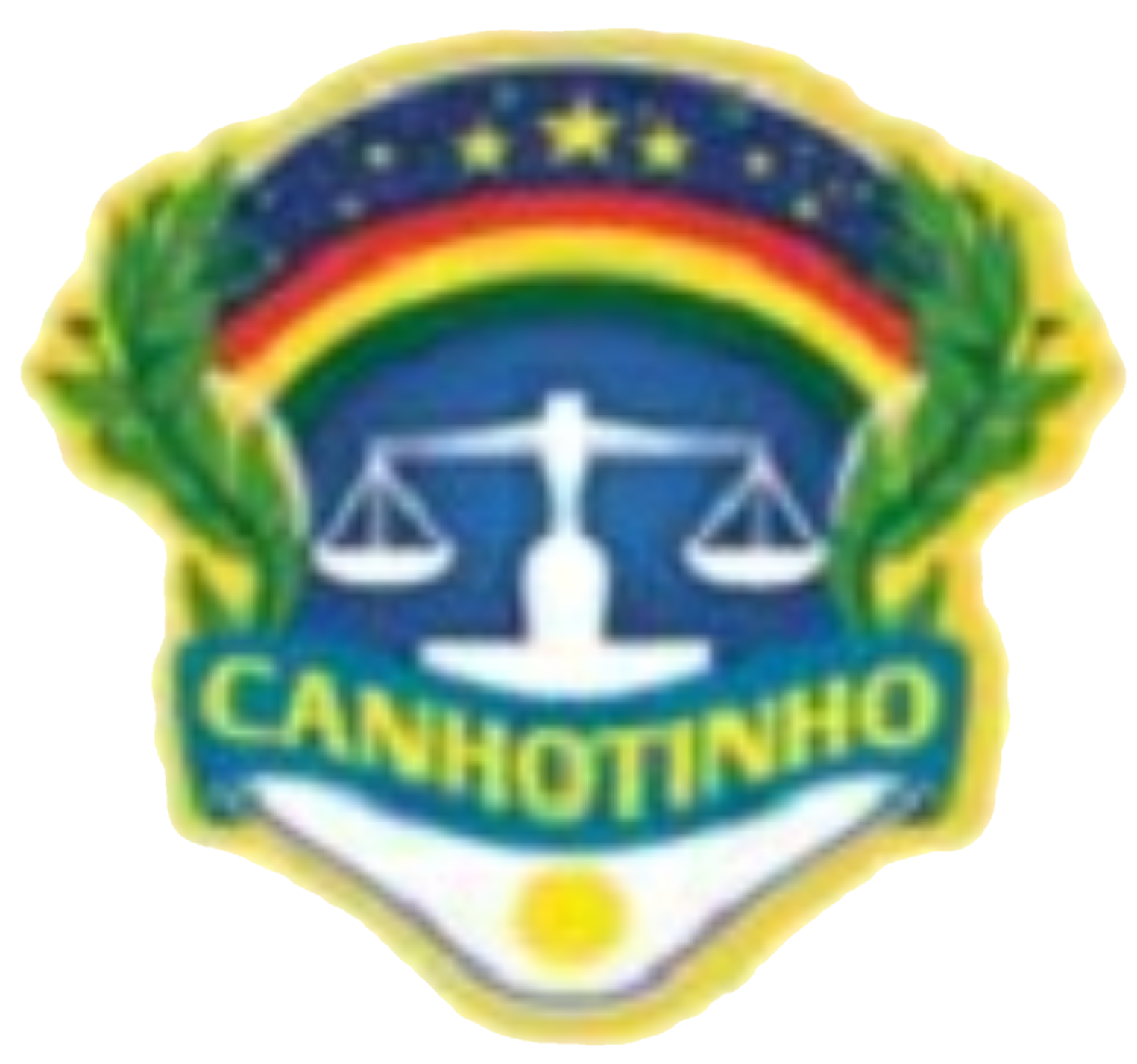
- Flag Coat of arms
- Etymology: Named after its founder's nickname
- Location of Canhotinho in Pernambuco

- Location within Brazil Location within South America
- Coordinates: 8°52′55″S 36°11′27″W
- Country: Brazil
- Region: Northeast
- State: Pernambuco
- Founded: 2 October 1890

Government
  - Mayor: Sandra Rejane Lopes de Barros (Republicanos) (2025-2028)
  - Vice Mayor: Marco Antônio Magalhães Torres (PODE) (2025-2028)

Area
  - Total: 422.830 km^{2} (163.256 sq mi)
- Elevation: 520 m (1,710 ft)

Population (2022 Census)
  - Total: 24,329
  - Estimate (2025): 25,103
  - Density: 57.49/km^{2} (148.9/sq mi)
- Demonym: Canhotinhense (Brazilian Portuguese)
- Time zone: UTC-03:00 (Brasília Time)
- Postal code: 55420-000, 55423-000, 55425-000
- HDI (2010): 0.541 – low
- Website: canhotinho.pe.gov.br

Canhotinho(Central northeastern portuguese pronunciation: [kɐ̃j̃oˈtĩj̃u]) (Little Left-handed) is a city located in the state of Pernambuco, Brazil. It is 223 km away from Recife, capital of the state of Pernambuco. Canhotinho has an estimated (2022 Census) population of 24,773 inhabitants.

== Geography ==
- State - Pernambuco
- Region - Agreste Pernambucano
- Boundaries - Lajedo and Jurema (N); Palmeirina (S); Quipapá and Alagoas state (E); Angelim and Calçado (W).
- Area - 423.08 km^{2}
- Elevation - 520 m
- Hydrography - Mundaú and Una rivers
- Vegetation - Subperenifólia forest
- Climate - Hot and humid
- Annual average temperature - 21.7 c
- Distance to Recife - 223 km

== Economy ==
The main economic activities in Canhotinho are based in commerce and agribusiness, especially sugarcane, beans, manioc; and livestock such as cattle, sheep and poultry.

=== Economic indicators ===
Population	GDP x(1000 R$).	GDP pc (R$)	PE
24.381	76.093	3.142	0.13%

Economy by sector 2006

Primary sector	Secondary sector	Service sector
14.52%	9.93%	75.55%

=== Health indicators ===
HDI (2000)	Hospitals (2007)	Hospitals beds (2007)	Children's mortality every 1000 (2005)
0.588	1	27	38.0

== See also ==
- List of municipalities in Pernambuco
