= Cachoeirinha, Pernambuco =

City in Pernambuco, Brazil

Cachoeirinha
- Municipality of Pernambuco, Brazil
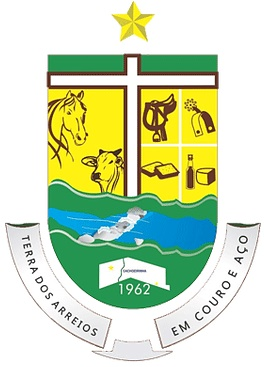
- Flag Coat of arms

- Location of Cachoeirinha in Pernambuco

- Location within Brazil Location within South America
- Coordinates: 8°29′9″S 36°13′58″W
- Country: Brazil
- Region: Northeast
- State: Pernambuco
- Founded: 21 November 1892

Government
  - Mayor: André Pedro Valença de Melo Raimundo (PSDB) (2025-2028)
  - Vice Mayor: Geraldo Odilon da Silva (PSDB) (2025-2028)

Area
  - Total: 179.262 km^{2} (69.213 sq mi)
- Elevation: 536 m (1,759 ft)

Population (2022 Census)
  - Total: 19,899
  - Estimate (2025): 20,673
  - Density: 111.01/km^{2} (287.5/sq mi)
- Demonym: Cachoeirinhense (Brazilian Portuguese)
- Time zone: UTC-03:00 (Brasília Time)
- Postal code: 55380-000, 55383-000
- HDI (2010): 0.579 – medium
- Website: cachoeirinha.pe.gov.br

Cachoeirinha (Central northeastern portuguese pronunciation: [kaʃueˈɾĩj̃ɐ]) is a city located in the state of Pernambuco, Brazil. Located at 169 km away from Recife, capital of the state of Pernambuco.

== Geography ==
- State - Pernambuco
- Region - Agreste Pernambucano
- Boundaries - Tacaimbó (N); Lajedo (S); São Caitano, Altinho and Ibirajuba (E); São Bento do Una (W).
- Area - 179.27 km^{2}
- Elevation - 536 m
- Hydrography - Una and Ipojuca rivers
- Vegetation - Caatinga Hipoxerófila
- Climate - Semi arid
- Annual average temperature - 21.0 c
- Distance to Recife - 169 km
- Population - 20,501 (2020)

== Economy ==
The main economic activities in Cachoeirinha are based in industry, commerce and agribusiness, especially beans, corn; and livestock such as cattle, pigs, sheep, goats, horses and poultry.

=== Economic indicators ===
Population	GDP x(1000 R$).	GDP pc (R$)	PE
18.123	66.476	3.816	0.11%

Economy by Sector 2006

Primary sector	Secondary sector	Service sector
18.40%	8.87%	72.73%

=== Health indicators ===
HDI (2000)	Hospitals (2007)	Hospitals beds (2007)	Children's Mortality every 1000 (2005)
0.642	1	16	26.5

== See also ==
- List of municipalities in Pernambuco
