= Palmeirina =

City in Pernambuco, Brazil

- Municipality of Pernambuco, Brazil
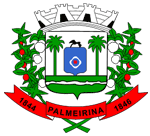
- Flag Coat of arms
- Etymology: Derived from the Brazilian Portuguese word palmeira, meaning "palm tree", due to the existence of palm trees along the Rochedo stream
- Location of Palmeirina in Pernambuco

- Location within Brazil Location within South America
- Coordinates: 9°0′14″S 36°19′33″W
- Country: Brazil
- Region: Northeast
- State: Pernambuco
- Founded: 31 December 1948

Government
  - Mayor: Thatianne Pinto Macedo Lima (PP) (2025-2028)
  - Vice Mayor: Francisco Caetano da Silva (PSD) (2025-2028)

Area
  - Total: 169.012 km^{2} (65.256 sq mi)
- Elevation: 531 m (1,742 ft)

Population (2022 Census)
  - Total: 7,031
  - Estimate (2025): 7,104
  - Density: 41.65/km^{2} (107.9/sq mi)
- Demonym: Palmeirinense (Brazilian Portuguese)
- Time zone: UTC-03:00 (Brasília Time)
- Postal code: 55310-000
- HDI (2010): 0.549 – low
- Website: palmeirina.pe.gov.br

Palmeirina (Central northeastern portuguese pronunciation: [pawmeˈɾĩj̃ɐ]) is a city located in the state of Pernambuco, Brazil. Located 252 km from Recife, capital of the state of Pernambuco, Palmeirina has an estimated (IBGE 2020) population of 7,600 inhabitants.

== Geography ==
- State - Pernambuco
- Region - Agreste Pernambucano
- Boundaries - São João and Angelim (N); Correntes and Alagoas state (S); Canhotinho (E); Garanhuns (W).
- Area - 158.01 km^{2}
- Elevation - 531 m
- Hydrography - Mundaú River
- Vegetation - Subperenifólia forest
- Climate - Hot and humid
- Annual average temperature - 22.7 c
- Distance to Recife - 252 km

== Economy ==
The main economic activities in Palmeirina are based in commerce and agribusiness, especially beans, bananas; and livestock such as cattle, sheep and poultry.

=== Economic indicators ===
Population	GDP x(1000 R$).	GDP pc (R$)	PE
8.481	30.029	3.538	0.05%

Economy by Sector 2006

Primary sector	Secondary sector	Service sector
19.35%	7.47%	73.18%

=== Health indicators ===
HDI (2000)	Hospitals (2007)	Hospitals beds (2007)	Children's Mortality every 1000 (2005)
0.596	1	4	52.6

== See also ==
- List of municipalities in Pernambuco
