= Altinho, Pernambuco =

Municipality in Pernambuco, Brazil

Altinho
- Municipality
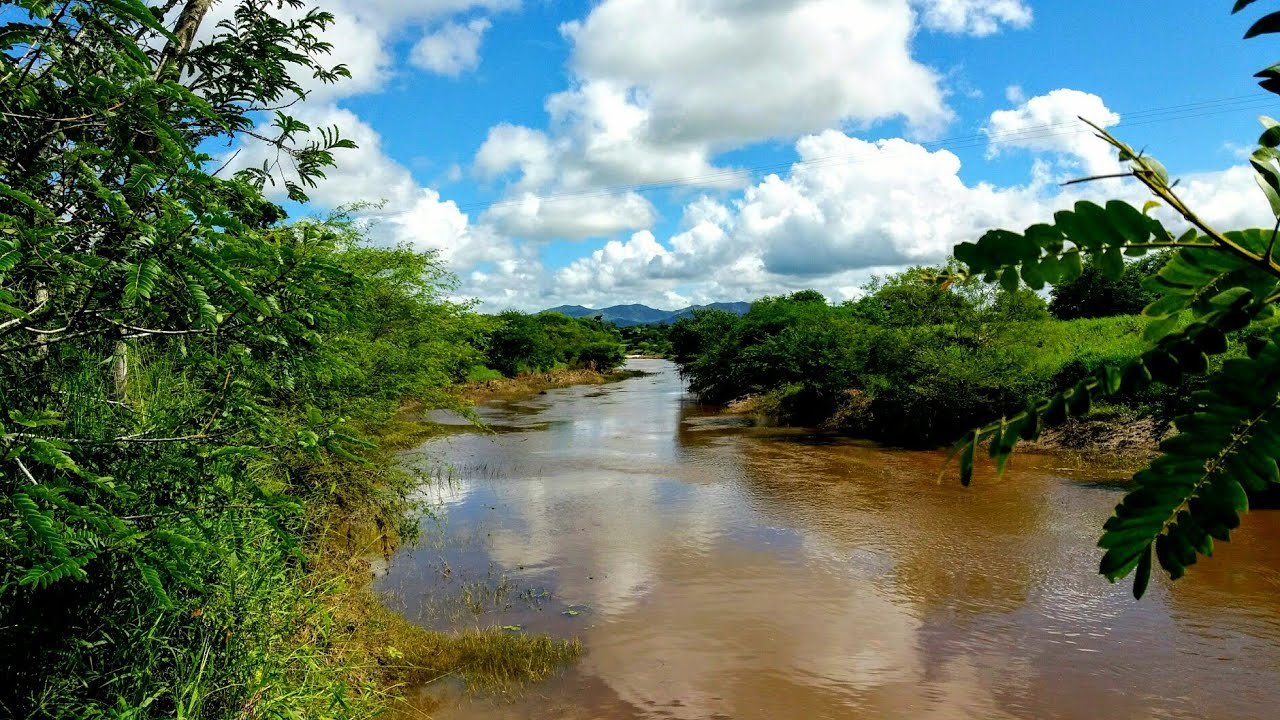
- Una River in Altinho

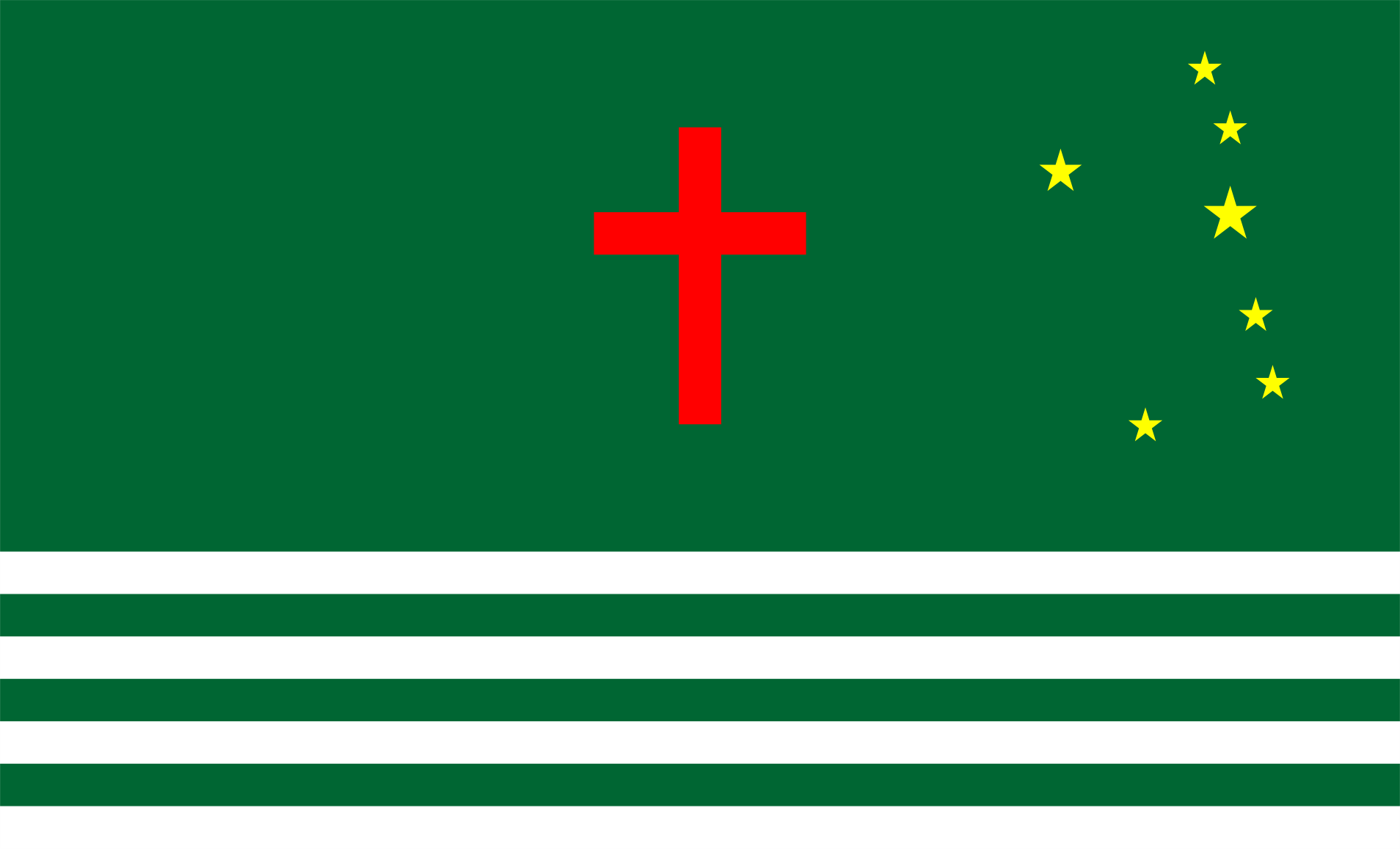
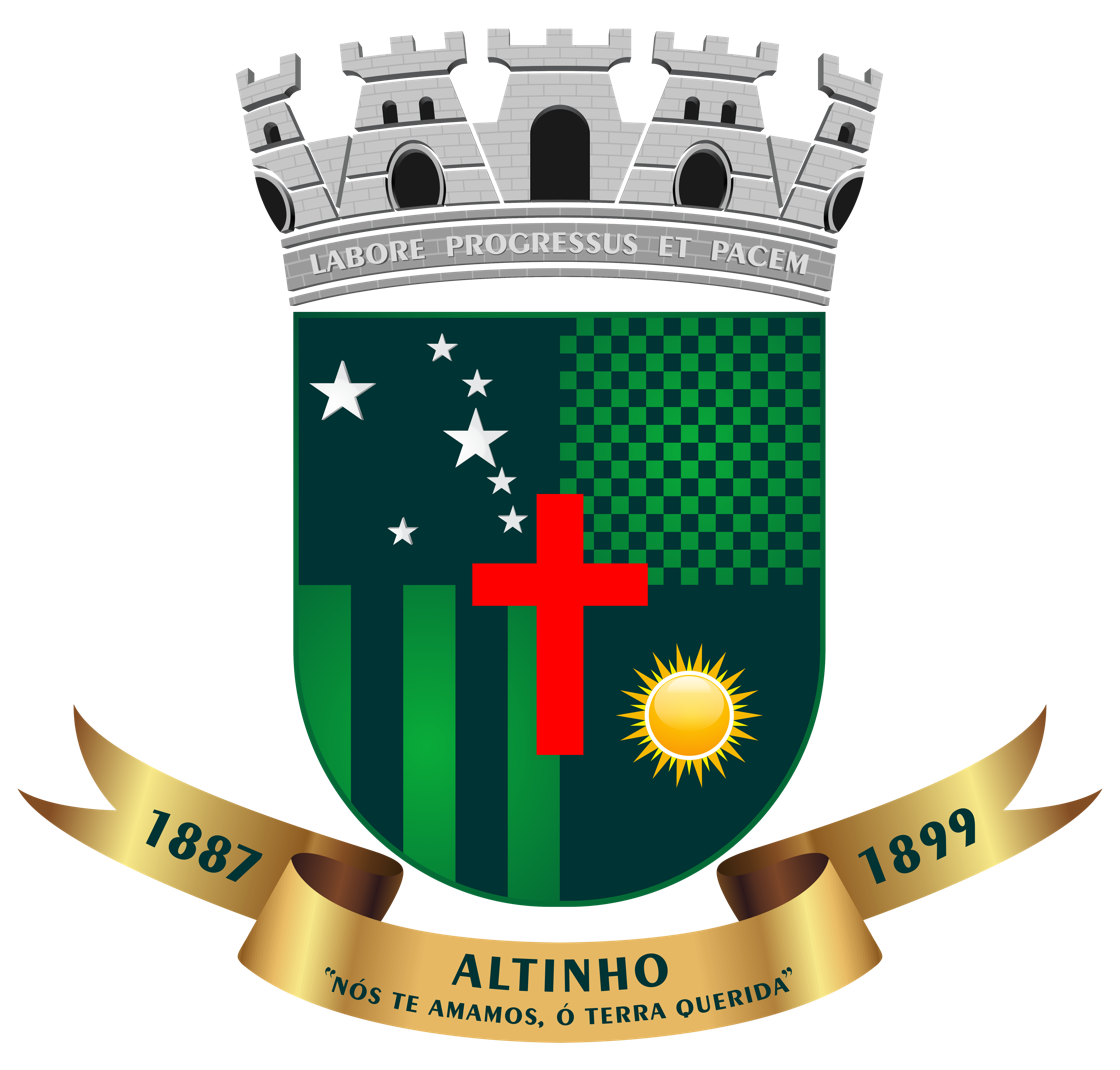
- Flag Coat of arms
- Etymology: In English "High", referring to the high plain the municipality is located on
- Location of Altinho in Pernambuco

- Location within Brazil Location within South America
- Coordinates: 8°29′24″S 36°03′32″W
- Country: Brazil
- Region: Northeast
- State: Pernambuco
- Founded: 11 September 1928

Government
  - Mayor: Marivaldo Pena (PSB) (2025-2028)
  - Vice Mayor: Adnailson Pedro Barbosa da Silva (PP) (2025-2028)

Area
  - Total: 450.178 km^{2} (173.815 sq mi)
- Elevation: 454 m (1,490 ft)

Population (2022 Census)
  - Total: 20,674
  - Estimate (2025): 21,134
  - Density: 45.92/km^{2} (118.9/sq mi)
- Demonym: Altinense (Brazilian Portuguese)
- Time zone: UTC-03:00 (Brasília Time)
- Postal code: 55490-000, 55493-000
- HDI (2010): 0.598 – medium
- Website: altinho.pe.gov.br

Altinho (local pron.: [awˈtĩj̃u]) is a municipality/city in the state of Pernambuco in Brazil. The population in 2022 Census, according with IBGE was 20,674 inhabitants and the total area is 450.17 km^{2}.

== Geography ==
- State - Pernambuco
- Region - Agreste of Pernambuco
- Boundaries - Caruaru and São Caetano (N); Cupira, Panelas and Ibirajuba (S); Agrestina (E); Cachoeirinha (W).
- Area - 452.52 km^{2}
- Elevation - 454 m
- Hydrography - Una and Ipojuca rivers
- Vegetation - Caatinga hiperxerófila
- Clima - semi arid hot
- Annual average temperature - 23.1 c
- Distance to Recife - 163 km

== Economy ==
The main economic activities in Altinho are related with commerce and agribusiness, especially creations of cattle, sheep, goats, pigs and chickens.

=== Economic Indicators ===
Population	GDP x(1000 R$).	GDP pc (R$)	PE
22.427	63.118	2.898	0.11%

Economy by Sector 2006

Primary sector	Secondary sector	Service sector
8.03%	9.81%	82.16%

=== Health Indicators ===
HDI (2000)	Hospitals (2007)	Hospitals beds (2007)	Children's Mortality every 1000 (2005)
0.590	1	18	18.3

== See also ==
- List of municipalities in Pernambuco
