= Corrente (disambiguation) =

Corrente is a type of dance from the late Renaissance and the Baroque era.

Corrente or correntes may also refer to:

- Corrente (surname), including a list of people with the name
- Correntes, Pernambuco, a town in the state of Pernambuco, Northeast Region, Brazil
- Corrente, Piauí, a municipality in the Northeast Region of Brazil
- Corrente, an Italian carsharing service provided by Trasporto Passeggeri Emilia-Romagna
- Corrente River (disambiguation), several rivers named Corrente or Correntes
- Corrente, an antifascist movement opposed to Mussolini

== See also ==
- Cape Correntes, a headland in the Inhambane Province, Mozambique
