= Tacaimbó =

Municipality of Pernambuco, Brazil

- Municipality of Pernambuco, Brazil
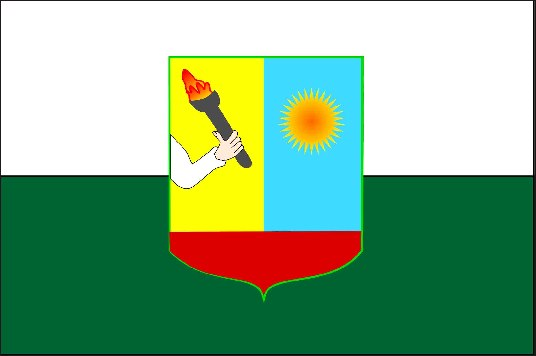
- Flag
- Etymology: Named after an indigenous tribe
- Location of Tacaimbó in Pernambuco

- Location within Brazil Location within South America
- Coordinates: 8°18′57″S 36°17′34″W
- Country: Brazil
- Region: Northeast
- State: Pernambuco
- Founded: 30 December 1963

Government
  - Mayor: Joelda Lima da Silva Pereira (PSDB) (2025-2028)
  - Vice Mayor: Givanildo João da Silva (PSDB) (2025-2028)

Area
  - Total: 227.601 km^{2} (87.877 sq mi)
- Elevation: 576 m (1,890 ft)

Population (2022 Census)
  - Total: 13,738
  - Estimate (2025): 14,330
  - Density: 60.36/km^{2} (156.3/sq mi)
- Demonym: Tacaimboense (Brazilian Portuguese)
- Time zone: UTC-03:00 (Brasília Time)
- Postal code: 55140-000, 55145-000
- HDI (2010): 0.554 – medium
- Website: tacaimbo.pe.gov.br

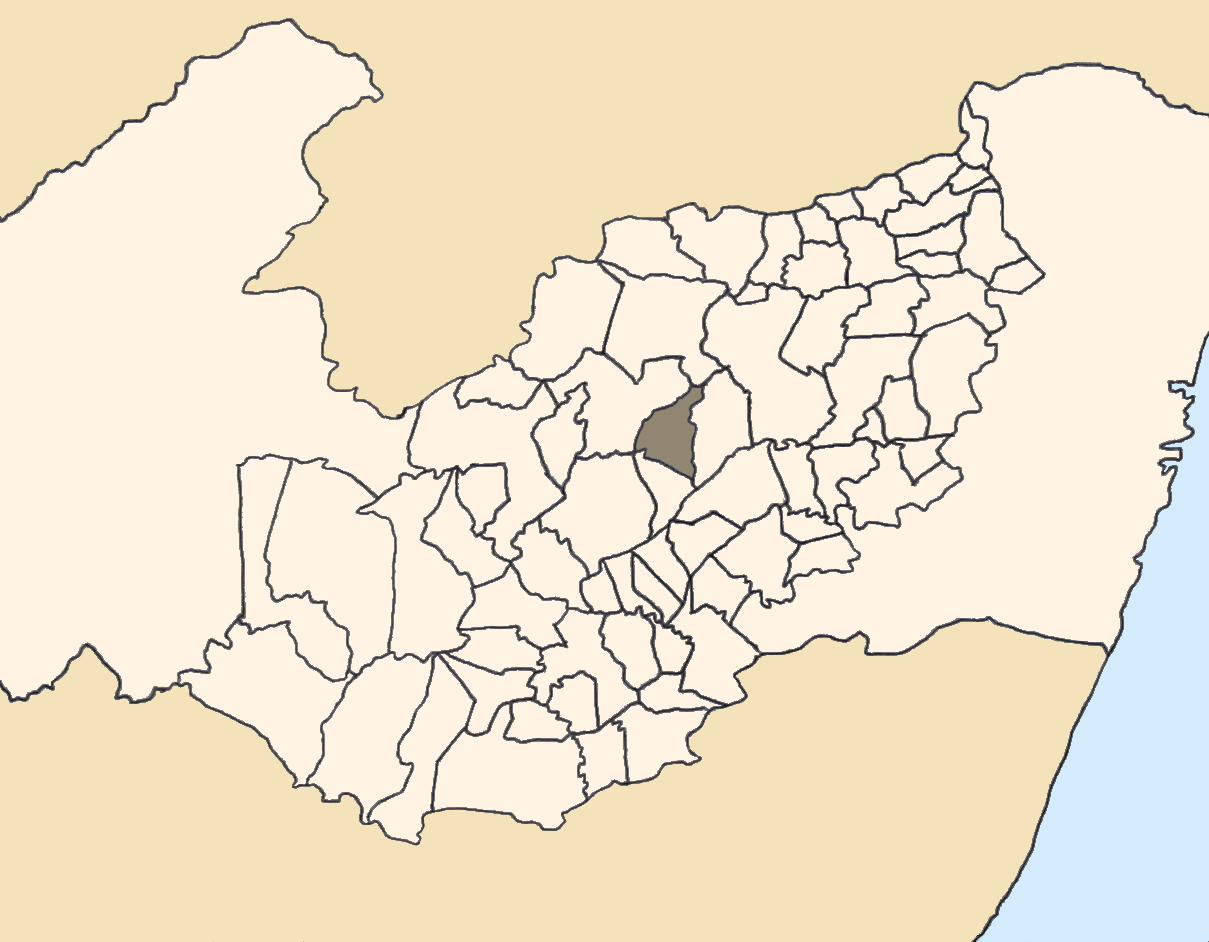
Location of Tacaimbó within Pernambuco.

Tacaimbó (Central northeastern portuguese pronunciation: [tɐkɐĩˈbɔ]) is a city in the state of Pernambuco, Brazil.

== Geography ==
- State - Pernambuco
- Region - Agreste Pernambucano
- Boundaries - Brejo da Madre de Deus (N); Cachoeirinha (S); São Caitano (E); Belo Jardim (W)
- Area - 227.6 km^{2}
- Elevation - 576 m
- Hydrography - Capibaribe, Ipojuca and Una rivers
- Vegetation - Caatinga Hiperxerófila
- Climate - semi arid hot
- Annual average temperature - 26.0 c
- Distance to Recife - 165 km
- Population - 14,330 (2025)

== Economy ==
The main economic activities in Tacaimbó are based in wood industry and agribusiness especially plantations of beans and manioc; and creations of cattle and goats.

=== Economic indicators ===
Population	GDP x(1000 R$).	GDP pc (R$)	PE
12.273	38.595	3.191	0.065%

Economy by Sector 2006

Primary sector	Secondary sector	Service sector
13.39%	11.73%	74.88%

=== Health indicators ===
HDI (2000)	Hospitals (2007)	Hospitals beds (2007)	Children's Mortality every 1000 (2005)
0.598	--	--	41.5

== See also ==
- List of municipalities in Pernambuco
