= São Caetano, Pernambuco =

Municipality of Pernambuco, Brazil

São Caetano
- Municipality of Pernambuco, Brazil
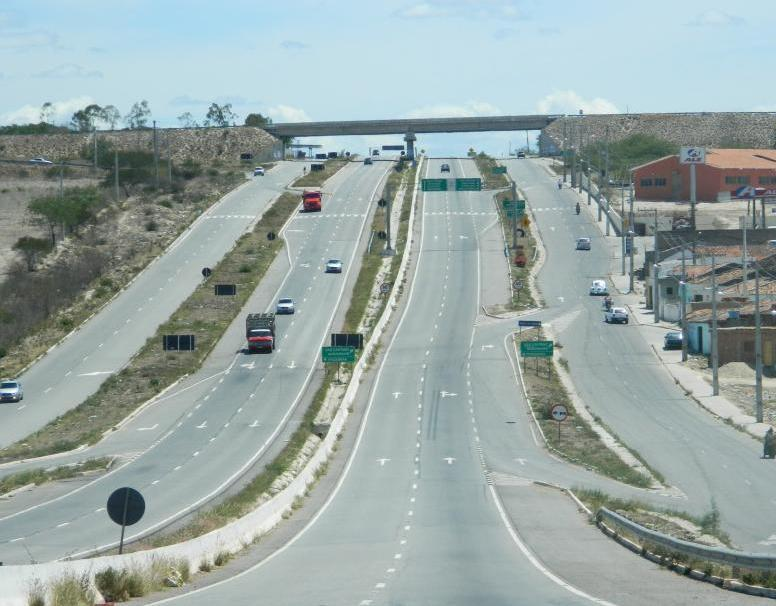
- BR-232 in São Caetano

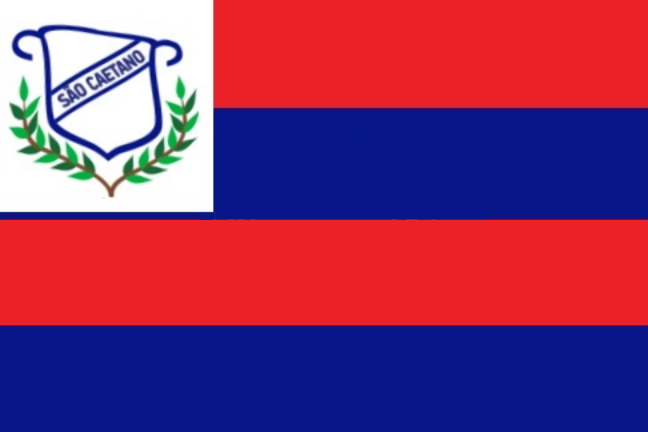
- Flag

- Location of São Caetano in Pernambuco

- Location within Brazil Location within South America
- Coordinates: 8°19′33″S 36°8′34″W
- Country: Brazil
- Region: Northeast
- State: Pernambuco
- Founded: 11 September 1928

Government
  - Mayor: Josafa Almeida Lima (UNIÃO) (2025-2028)
  - Vice Mayor: Ildefonso Rodrigues dos Santos (MDB) (2025-2028)

Area
  - Total: 382.483 km^{2} (147.678 sq mi)
- Elevation: 552 m (1,811 ft)

Population (2022)
  - Total: 37,126
  - Density: 97.07/km^{2} (251.4/sq mi)
- Demonym: São-caitanense (Brazilian Portuguese)
- Time zone: UTC-03:00 (Brasília Time)
- Postal code: 55130-000, 55135-000, 55138-000
- HDI (2010): 0.591 – medium
- Website: saocaetano.pe.gov.br

São Caetano (Central northeastern portuguese pronunciation: [sɐ̃w kɐjˈtɐ̃nu]), also known as São Caitano, is a city in the Brazilian state of Pernambuco.

== Geography ==
- State - Pernambuco
- Region - Agreste Pernambucano
- Boundaries - Brejo da Madre de Deus (N); Altinho (S); Caruaru (E); Tacaimbó and Cachoeirinha (W)
- Area - 382.48 km^{2}
- Elevation - 552 m
- Hydrography - Capibaribe, Ipojuca and Una River (Pernambuco) rivers
- Vegetation - Caatinga Hipoxerófila
- Climate - semi arid hot
- Annual average temperature - 22.7 c
- Distance to Recife - 148 km
- Population - 37,368 (2020)

== Economy ==
The main economic activities in São Caetano are based on the textile industry, commerce and agribusiness especially plantations of manioc; and farming of cattle, goats, sheep and pigs.

=== Economic indicators ===
Population	GDP x(1000 R$).	GDP pc (R$)	PE
36.366	102.243	2.941	0.17%

Economy by Sector 2006

Primary sector	Secondary sector	Service sector
3.25%	12.46%	84.29%

=== Health indicators ===
HDI (2000)	Hospitals (2007)	Hospitals beds (2007)	Children's Mortality every 1000 (2005)
0.580	1	41	29.8

== See also ==
- List of municipalities in Pernambuco
