= Facilnet Futebol Clube =

Facilnet
- Full name: Facilnet Futebol Clube
- Founded: 6 August 2026; 3 months ago
- Ground: Clementino Lima, Lajedo
- Capacity: 2,500
- Owner: Erik Farias
- Manager: Fábio Nascimento
- League: Campeonato Pernambucano

Facilnet Futebol Clube is a Brazilian football club from Garanhuns in the state of Pernambuco. Founded in 2026, the club plays in the Campeonato Pernambucano, the top division of football in the state.

== History ==
Facilnet, an Internet service provider founded by Erik Farias, had a seven-a-side football team that was runner-up in the Brazil Open and semi-finalist in the Nordeste Cup. In May 2026, the company attended talks on the new format of the Campeonato Pernambucano, the top division of professional football in the state.

The professional club was launched on 6 August, with colours of orange and blue, and a falcon mascot. Due to not agreeing to share the cost of the local stadium in Garanhuns with Sete de Setembro, the club plays in Lajedo. The club launched with 17 players. Former Flamengo striker Hernane joined the coaching team. The Campeonato Pernambucano expanded to 31 clubs for the 2026–27 season due to the abolition of the lower divisions, and Facilnet was admitted to Group A of six clubs in the far west of the state.

On 20 October 2026, Facilnet won its first competitive match 4–0 away to Ferroviário do Cabo, with the first goal scored by Índio after 12 minutes. After finishing the first phase unbeaten but behind Petrolina on goal difference, the club lost 2–0 at home to Belo Jardim in the last 16.
