= Graciete Santana =

Brazilian long-distance runner (1980–2021)

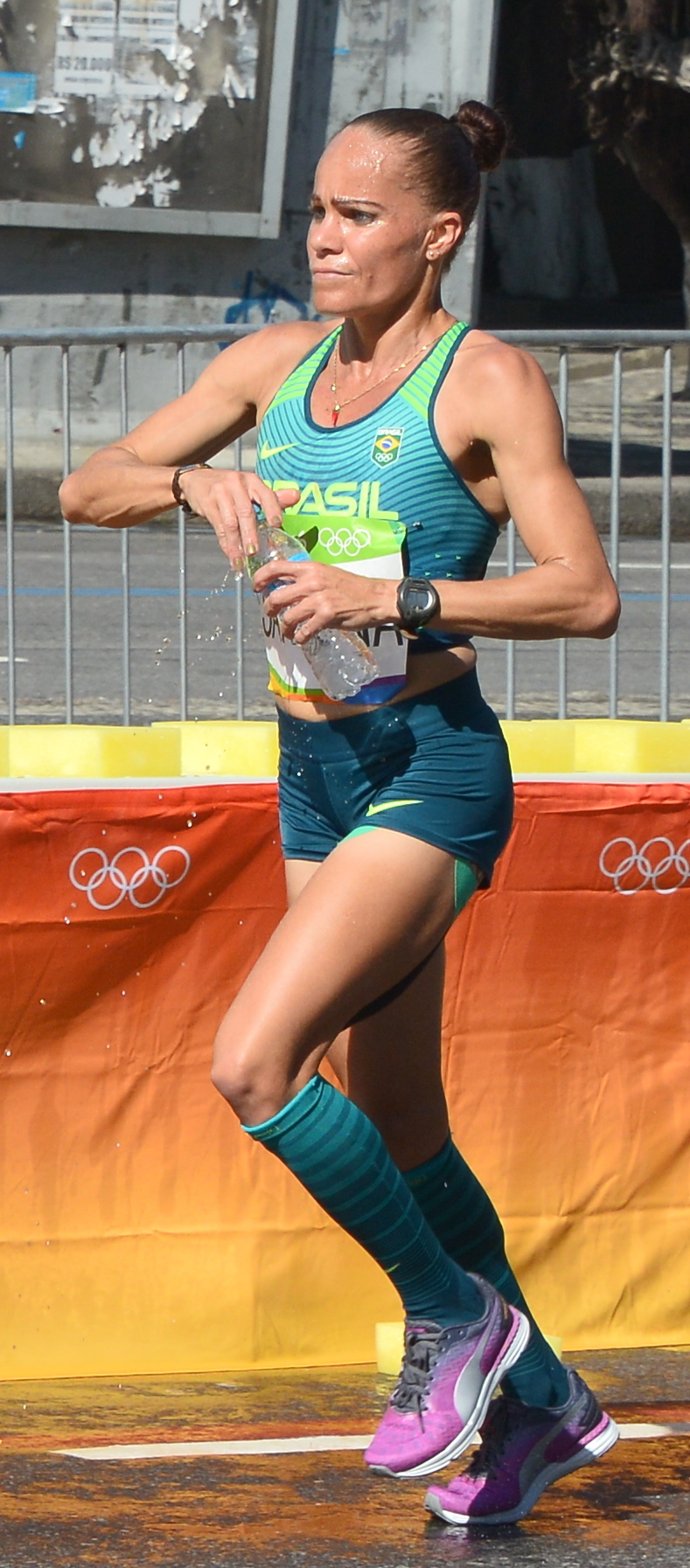
- Santana at the 2016 Olympics

Personal information
- Born: 12 October 1980 Serra Preta, Brazil
- Died: 16 September 2021 (aged 40) Salvador, Bahia, Brazil
- Height: 155 cm (5 ft 1 in)
- Weight: 43 kg (95 lb)

Sport
- Sport: Track and field
- Event: Marathon
- Club: Cruzeiro Esporte Clube
- Coached by: Domingos Carlos (husband)

Achievements and titles
- Personal best: 2:38:33 (2016)

Graciete Moreira Carneiro Santana (12 October 1980 – 16 September 2021) was a Brazilian long-distance runner. She placed 128th in the 2016 Olympics marathon. Santana took up running to help her overcome bulimia.

On 16 September 2021, Santana died of melanoma in Salvador, Bahia, at the age of 40.
