= Valdiram =

Brazilian footballer (1982–2019)

Personal information
- Full name: Valdiram Caetano de Morais
- Date of birth: 30 October 1982
- Place of birth: Canhotinho, Brazil
- Date of death: 20 April 2019 (aged 36)
- Place of death: São Paulo, Brazil
- Position: Striker

Senior career*
| Years | Team | Apps | (Gls) |
- Vasco da Gama
| 2009 | Noroeste | 1 | (0) |
| 2010 | Avenida | 3 | (1) |
| 2010 | Tupi | 3 | (2) |
| 2011 | Central | 1 | (0) |
| 2011 | Ferroviário | 2 | (0) |
| 2011 | Duque de Caxias | 7 | (0) |
| 2017 | Atlântico | 1 | (0) |
| Total | | 18+ | (3+) |
- * Club domestic league appearances and goals

Valdiram Caetano de Morais (30 October 1982 – 20 April 2019) was a Brazilian professional footballer who played as a striker.

== Early life and family ==
Valdiram was born in Canhotinho, Brazil.

== Career ==
Valdiram played for Vasco da Gama, where he was top scorer in the 2006 Copa do Brasil. He left the club in 2007, and played for 18 different clubs until 2011, including Noroeste, Avenida, Tupi, Central, Ferroviário and Duque de Caxias.

Valdiram's off-the-field problems halted his career in 2011, but he returned in 2017 with Atlântico.

== Personal life ==
Valdiram struggled with substance abuse. He spent time in drug rehabilitation but lived on the streets before being found beaten to death in São Paulo in April 2019.
