= Lajedo, Pernambuco =

Municipality of Pernambuco, Brazil

Lajedo
- Municipality
- Flag Coat of arms

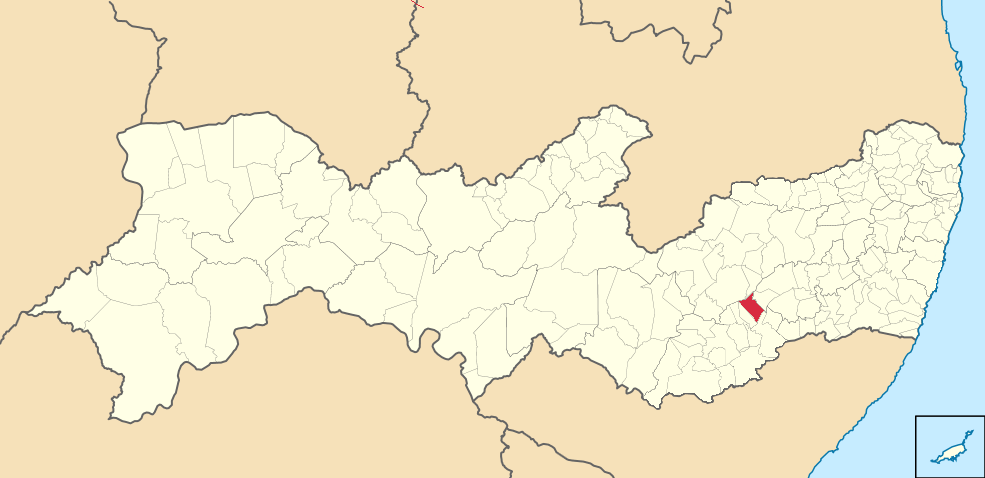
- Location in Pernambuco state

- Location in Brazil
- Coordinates: 8°39′50″S 36°19′12″W
- Country: Brazil
- Region: Northeast
- State: Pernambuco
- Mesoregion: Agreste Pernambucano

Area
  - Total: 189.10 km^{2} (73.01 sq mi)

Population (2022 Census)
  - Total: 39,582
  - Estimate (2025): 41,960
  - Density: 209.32/km^{2} (542.13/sq mi)
- Time zone: UTC−3 (BRT)

Lajedo (Central northeastern portuguese pronunciation: [laˈʒedu]) is a municipality and a city in the state of Pernambuco in Brazil. The population is 40,589 (2020 est.) in an area of 189.10 km^{2}. The city area is 3.5 km^{2}.

== Geography ==
- Boundaries - São Bento do Una and Cachoeirinha (N); Canhotinho (S); Ibirajuba (E); Calçado (W).
- Elevation - 661 m
- Hydrography - Una and Mundaú River
- Vegetation - Caatinga hiperxerófila
- Annual average temperature - 21.9 c
- Distance to Recife - 192 km

== Economy ==
The main economic activities in Lajedo are industry, commerce and agribusiness, especially farming of cattle, goats, pigs, sheep, chickens; and plantations of beans and manioc.

=== Economic Indicators ===
Mun. Population	GDP x(1000 R$).	GDP pc (R$)	PE
34.809	138.826	4.163	0.23%

Economy by Sector 2006

Primary sector	Secondary sector	Service sector
13.83%	10.43%	75.74%

=== Health Indicators ===
HDI (2000)	Hospitals (2007)	Hospitals beds (2007)	Children's Mortality every 1000 (2005)
0.625	1	24	20.4

== Villages ==
- Agrovila Rural
- Cantinho
- Imaculada
- Pau-Ferro
- Pereiro
- Prata
- Quatis
- Retiro
- Santa Luzia
- Olho d'Água dos Pombos

== See also ==
- List of municipalities in Pernambuco
