= Correntes, Pernambuco =

Town in Pernambuco, Brazil

Correntes
- Municipality of Pernambuco, Brazil
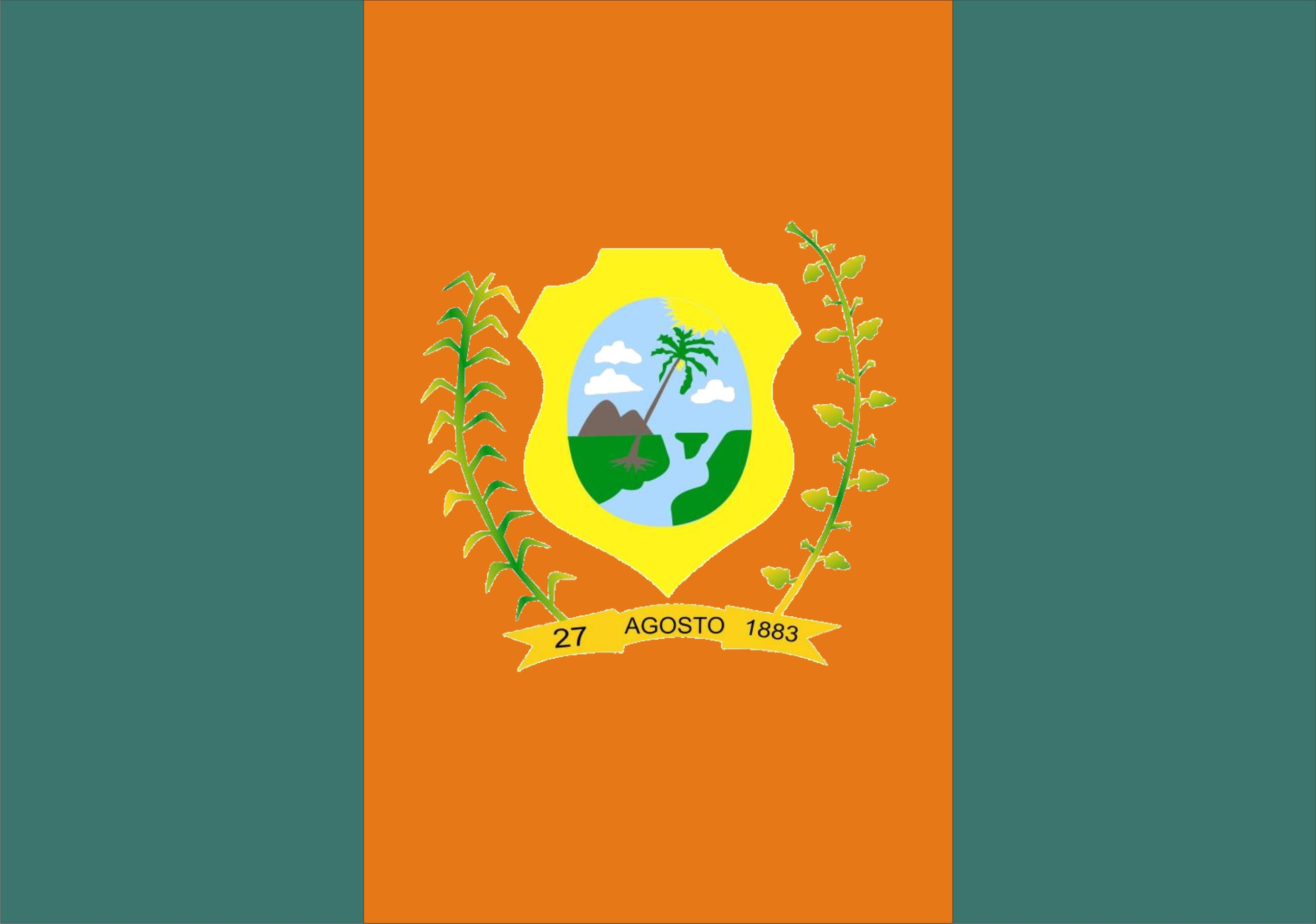
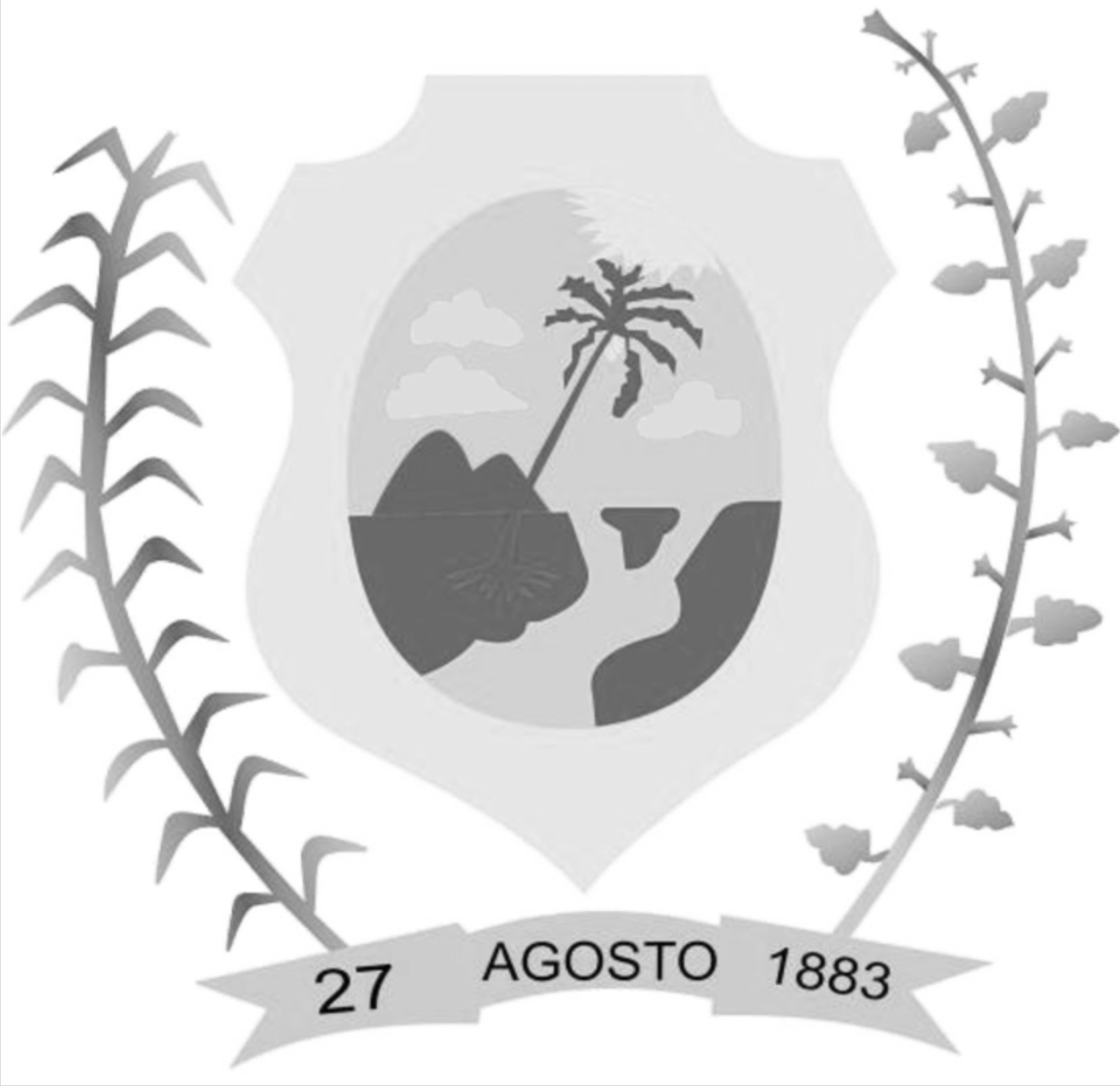
- Flag Coat of arms
- Etymology: Named after a river with three sources, the sources being called correntes
- Location of Correntes in Pernambuco

- Location within Brazil Location within South America
- Coordinates: 9°7′44″S 36°19′48″W
- Country: Brazil
- Region: Northeast
- State: Pernambuco
- Founded: 27 August 1883

Government
  - Mayor: Edimilson da Bahia de Lima Gomes (PT) (2025-2028)
  - Vice Mayor: Demilton Medeiros Ximendes Junior (PSB) (2025-2028)

Area
  - Total: 317.793 km^{2} (122.701 sq mi)
- Elevation: 391 m (1,283 ft)

Population (2022 Census)
  - Total: 17,131
  - Estimate (2025): 17,670
  - Density: 53.91/km^{2} (139.6/sq mi)
- Demonym: Correntense (Brazilian Portuguese)
- Time zone: UTC-03:00 (Brasília Time)
- Postal code: 55315-000, 55316-000, 55317-000
- HDI (2010): 0.536 – low
- Website: correntes.pe.gov.br

Correntes (Central northeastern portuguese pronunciation: [kɔˈhẽti(s)]) (Portuguese word for "chains") is a town located in the state of Pernambuco, Brazil. It is located 257.7 km (160.1 mi) away from Recife, the capital of the state of Pernambuco. It has an estimated population of 17,131 inhabitants (2022 Census).

== History ==
It was Antonio Machado Dias, a rich Portuguese farmer, who founded the town in 1826. Dias lived in the area where Correntes is currently located. He commanded the building of a catholic church dedicated to his patron saint (Saint Anthony). From that church, many people set up homes there, resulting in the village of Barra de Correntes, which ultimately became the town of Correntes.

== Geography ==
- State - Pernambuco
- Region - Agreste Pernambucano
- Boundaries - Garanhuns and Palmeirina (N); Alagoas state (S and E); Lagoa do Ouro (W).
- Area - 339.3 km^{2}
- Elevation - 391 m
- Hydrography - Mundaú River
- Vegetation - Subcaducifólia forest
- Climate - Hot and humid
- Annual average temperature - 23.7 c
- Distance to Recife - 257.7 km

== Economy ==
The main economic activities in Correntes are based in agribusiness, especially sweet potatoes, beans, manioc; and livestock such as cattle, sheep, horses and chickens.

=== Economic indicators ===
Population	GDP x(1000 R$).	GDP pc (R$)	PE
16.686	58.359	3.574	0.097%

Economy by Sector 2006

Primary sector	Secondary sector	Service sector
20.03%	8.20%	71.77%

=== Health indicators ===
HDI (2000)	Hospitals (2007)	Hospital beds (2007)	Children's Mortality every 1000 (2005)
0.587	1	11	16.8

== Hymn ==
The hymn of Correntes was composed by Arlinda Brasil, a retired teacher.

Sample:

Portuguese version (original)
Correntes, nosso torrão adorado
Berço que nos viu nascer
Por ti daremos tudo e
Só a ti devemos querer

English version
Correntes, our dear land
Cradle that saw our birth
We will give everything for you
And only you we must love

== See also ==
- List of municipalities in Pernambuco
