= Juranda, Paraná =

Municipality in Southern Brazil

Coordinates: 24°26′S 52°50′W

- Municipality
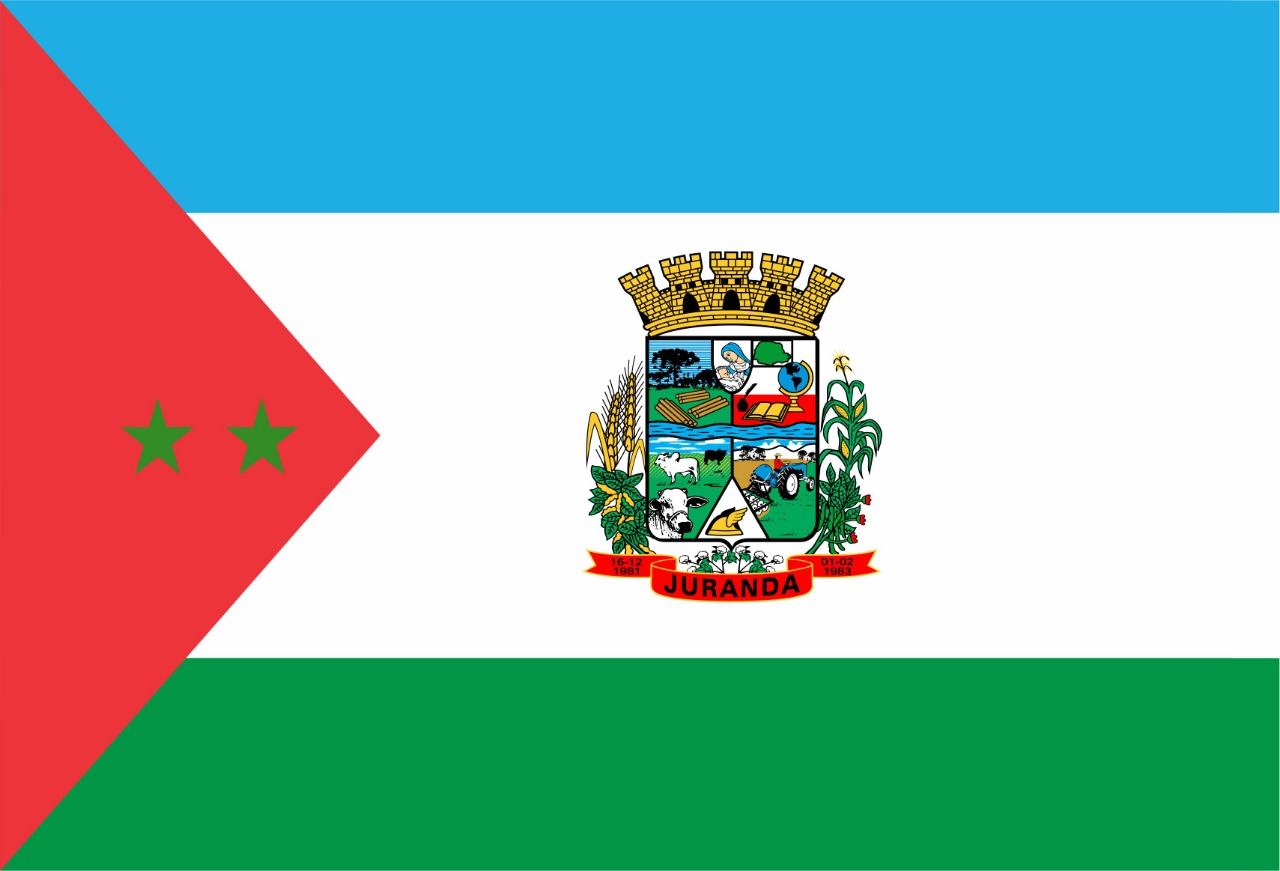
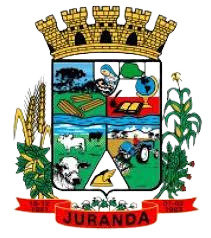
- Flag Seal

- Country: Brazil
- Region: Southern
- State: Paraná
- Mesoregion: Centro Ocidental Paranaense
- Emancipated: 16 December 1981

Government
  - Mayor: Joelma Damasceno Demeneck (PSD)

Population (2020)
  - Total: 7,292
- Time zone: UTC−3 (BRT)
- CEP: 87355-000
- Area code: +55 44

Juranda, Paraná is a municipality in the state of Paraná in the Southern Region of Brazil.

== See also ==
- List of municipalities in Paraná
