= Lagoa do Ouro =

Municipality of Pernambuco, Brazil

- Municipality
- Município de Lagoa do Ouro; Municipality of Lagoa do Ouro
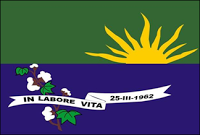
- Flag

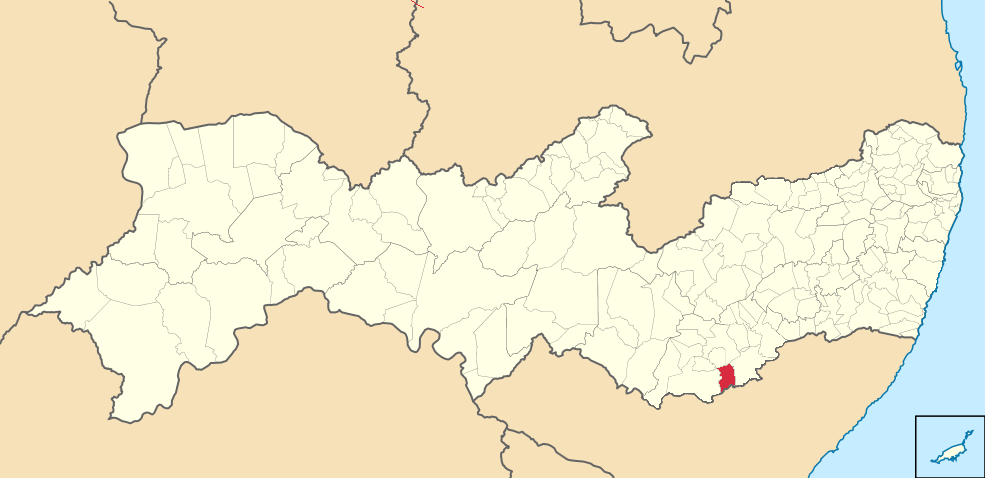
- Location in the state of Pernambuco

- Location in Brazil
- Coordinates: 09°07′37″S 36°27′32″W
- Country: Brazil
- Region: Northeast
- State: Pernambuco
- Founded: December 31, 1958

Government
  - Mayor: Marquidoves Viera Marques (Brazilian Socialist Party)

Area
  - Total: 198.760 km^{2} (76.742 sq mi)
- Elevation: 653 m (2,142 ft)

Population (2022 Census)
  - Total: 11,933
  - Estimate (2025): 12,367
  - Density: 60.037/km^{2} (155.50/sq mi)
- Time zone: UTC−3 (BRT)
- Postal Code: 55320-000
- Area code: +55 87
- ISO 3166 code: BR
- Website: Lagoa do Ouro, PE

Lagoa do Ouro (Central northeastern portuguese pronunciation: [laˈɡoˑɐ ˈdu ˈoɾu]) (Golden Pond) is a city located in the state of Pernambuco, Brazil, located 263 km (163 mi) west from Recife.

== History ==
In early 1902, Captain Amador José Monteiro of the Brazilian National Guard presented a manifesto to the Municipal Council of the municipality Correntes. The council gathered on February 9, 1902, and authorized the first fair of the village. The council also approved of the town's name of Igatauá during this meeting. On December 9, 1938, the name was changed to Lagoa do Ouro due to an urban legend that arose in the village, where nuggets or gold bars were believed to be in a local pond belonging to the estate of João Alves da Silva, who became known as John Gold.

== Geography ==
The municipality contains part of the Pedra Talhada Biological Reserve, a fully protected conservation unit created in 1989.

=== Climate ===
Lagoa do Ouro has a tropical savanna climate (Aw) according to the Köppen climate classification.

== Economy ==
The main economic activities in Lagoa do Ouro are based in agribusiness. Beans, manioc, corn and livestock such as cattle, sheep and poultry are the main agricultural resources within the municipality.

=== Economic indicators ===
GDP x (1000 R$)	GDP pc (R$)	PE
39.597	3.397	0.06%

Economy by Sector (2006)

Primary sector	Secondary sector	Service sector
20.05%	8.11%	71.84%

=== Health indicators ===
HDI (2000)	Hospitals (2007)	Hospitals beds (2007)	Child mortality rate per 1,000 births (2005)
0.569	1	17	27.7

== See also ==
- List of municipalities in Pernambuco
