= Serra Preta =

City in Bahia State, Brazil

- Municipality of Bahia, Brazil
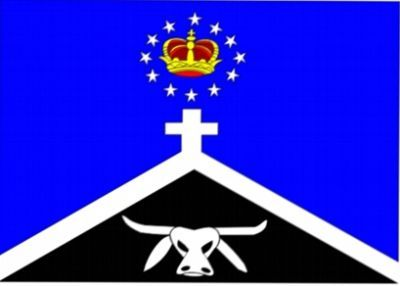
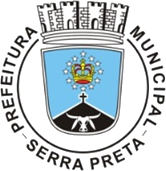
- Flag Coat of arms
- Etymology: Name of a hill in the area
- Location of Serra Preta in Bahia

- Location within Brazil Location within South America
- Coordinates: 12°09′36″S 39°19′55″W
- Country: Brazil
- Region: Northeast
- State: Bahia
- Founded: 19 December 1953

Government
  - Mayor: Franklin Leite da Silva (Avante) (2025-2028)
  - Vice Mayor: Mario Gonçalves Neto (PSD) (2025-2028)

Area
  - Total: 595.297 km^{2} (229.845 sq mi)
- Elevation: 270 m (890 ft)

Population (2022)
  - Total: 17,996
  - Density: 30.23/km^{2} (78.3/sq mi)
- Demonym: Serra-pretense (Brazilian Portuguese)
- Time zone: UTC-03:00 (Brasília Time)
- Postal code: 44660-000
- HDI (2010): 0.566 – low
- Website: serrapreta.ba.gov.br

Serra Preta is a city located in the eastern state of Bahia, Brazil. The population in this arid region is 14,699. Serra Preta is about 150 miles northwest from Bahia's capital, Salvador, and 600 miles north of Rio de Janeiro.

== History ==
Native peoples moved into the area, which sprung up around an establishment known as Taquari's farm. In the 15th century, Portuguese explorers came to Brazil and claimed the land for Portugal.

Bahia became the center of sugar cultivation from the 16th to the 18th centuries. Integral to the sugar economy was the importation of a vast number of African slaves; more than 35% of all slaves taken from Africa were sent to Brazil, mostly to be processed in Bahia before being sent to work in plantations elsewhere in the country. This is reflected in Serra Preta's population, which is mainly mixed races, mostly African.
