= São Bento do Una =

Municipality of Pernambuco, Brazil

- Municipality
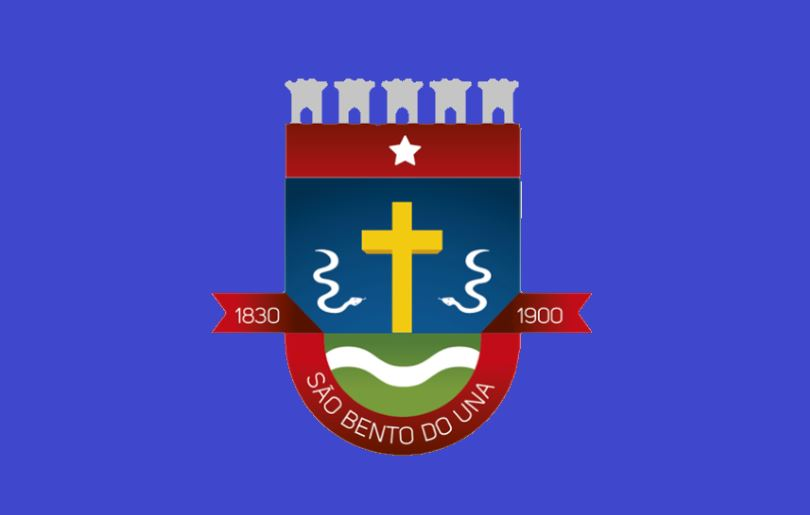
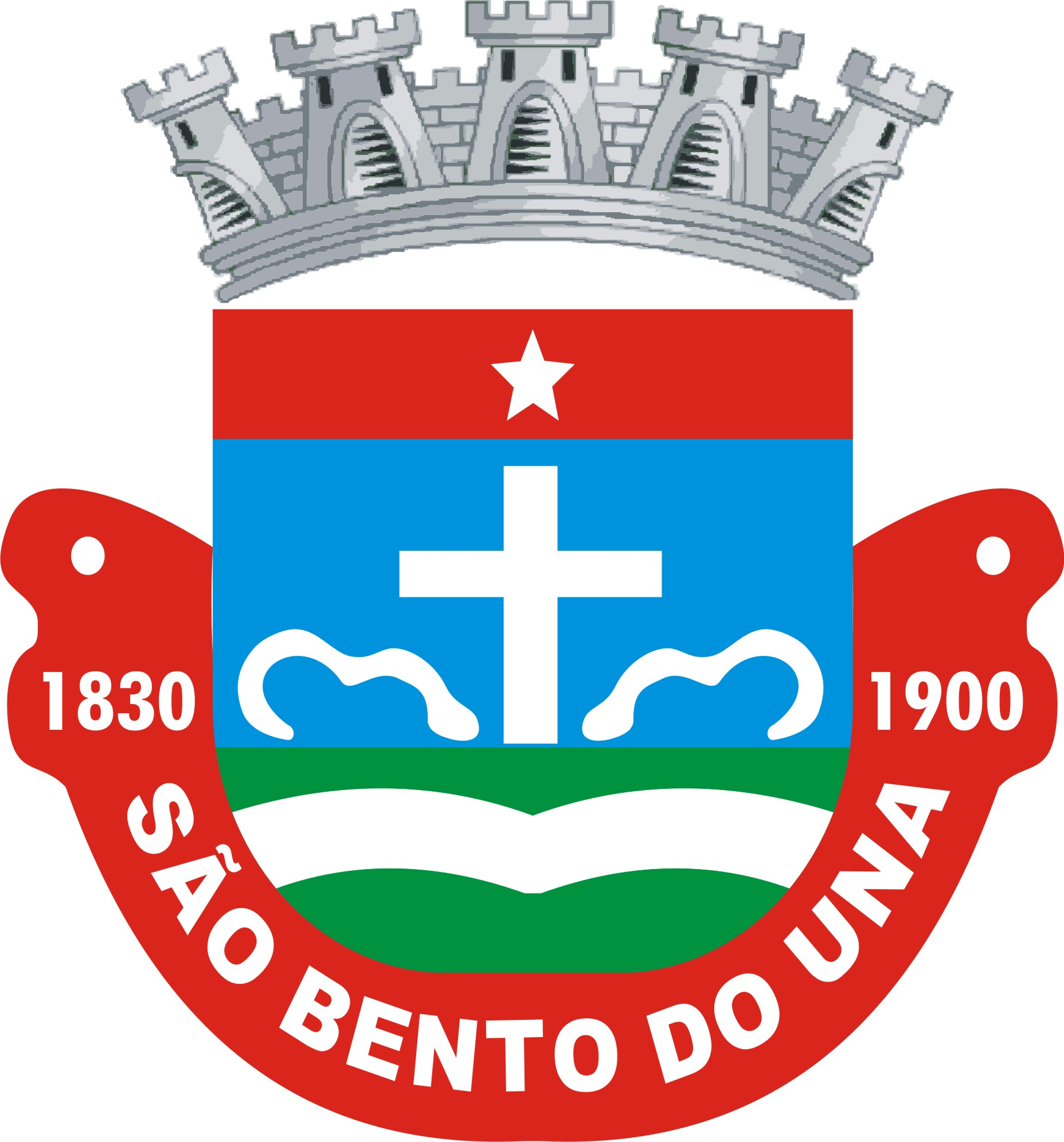
- Flag Coat of arms

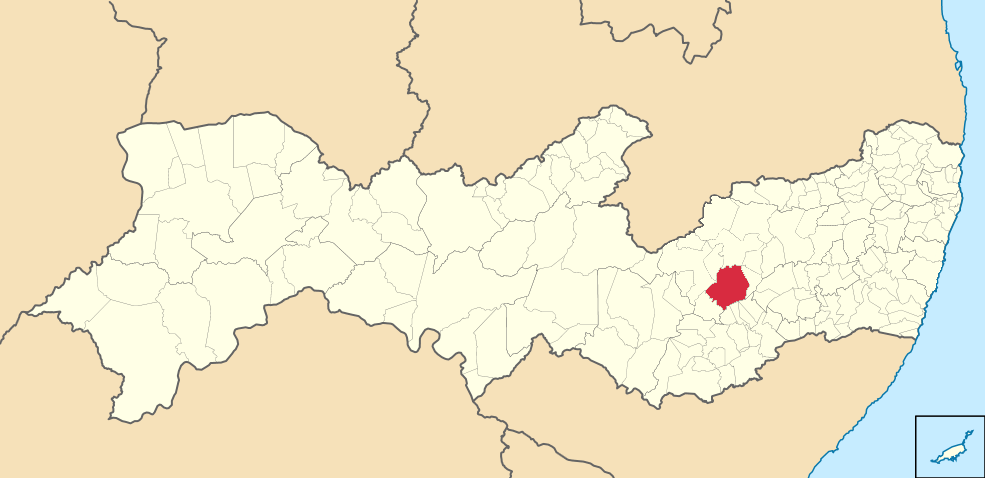
- Location in Pernambuco state

- Location in Brazil
- Coordinates: 8°31′22″S 36°26′38″W
- Country: Brazil
- Region: Northeast
- State: Pernambuco

Area
  - Total: 727 km^{2} (281 sq mi)
- Elevation: 614 m (2,014 ft)

Population (2022 Census)
  - Total: 49,449
  - Estimate (2025): 51,165
  - Density: 68.0/km^{2} (176/sq mi)
- Time zone: UTC−3 (BRT)

São Bento do Una (Portuguese pronunciation: [sɐ̃w ˈbẽtu du ˈunɐ]) is a city from the Northeastern Region of Brazil at the Pernambuco state. According to the IBGE, it has an estimated population of 51,165 inhabitants (2025). It is located at latitude 08°31'22" South and longitude 36°26'40" West, and at approximately 614 meters above sea level.

== Geography ==
- State - Pernambuco
- Region - Agreste Pernambucano
- Boundaries - Belo Jardim (N); Jucati, Jupi and Lajedo (S); Capoeiras, Pesqueira and Sanharó (W); Cachoeirinha (E)
- Area - 727 km^{2}
- Elevation - 614 m
- Hydrography - Ipojuca and Una rivers
- Vegetation - Hipoxerófila caatinga
- Climate - Semi arid hot
- Distance to Recife - 207 km

== Economy ==
The main economic activities in São Bento do Una are based in commerce and agribusiness, especially plantations of beans, corn and manioc and creations of livestock such as: chickens, quails and their eggs, cattle, milk, pigs, sheep, goats and donkeys .

=== Economic Indicators ===
Population	GDP x(1000 R$).	GDP pc (R$)	PE
49.372	208.020	4.404	0.33%

Economy by Sector 2006

Primary sector	Secondary sector	Service sector
29.21%	8.63%	62.16%

=== Health Indicators ===
HDI (2000)	Hospitals (2007)	Hospitals beds (2007)	Children's Mortality every 1000 (2005)
0.623	1	29	21.4

== Fun facts ==
- The city has a popular street party which the main attraction is a race of chickens.

== See also ==
- List of municipalities in Pernambuco
