= Corrente (surname) =

Corrente is a surname. Notable people with the surname include:

- Matt Corrente (born 1988), Canadian ice-hockey player
- Michael Corrente (born 1959), American film director and producer
- Robert Clark Corrente, American attorney
- Tony Corrente (born 1951), American football official
