= Jupi =

Municipality in Pernambuco, Brazil

- Municipality of Pernambuco, Brazil
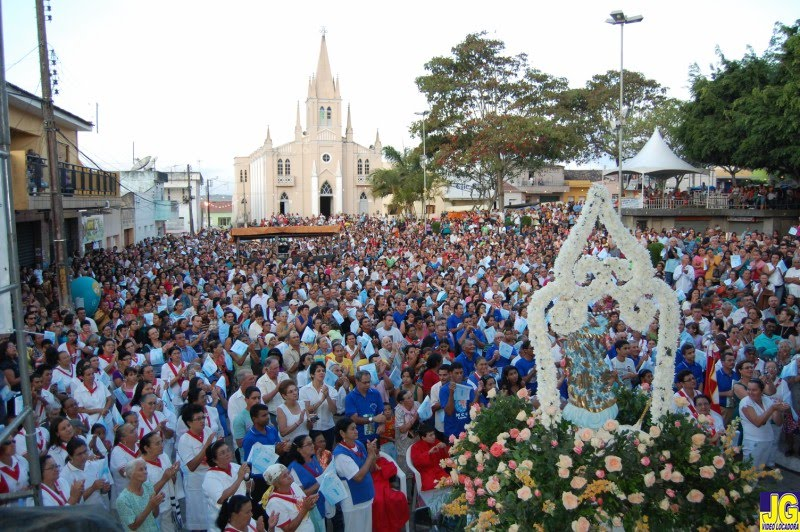
- Our Lady of the Rosary Plaza in Jupi

- Flag Coat of arms
- Etymology: Derived from the indigenous word yupi, meaning "sharp thorn"
- Location of Jupi in Pernambuco

- Location within Brazil Location within South America
- Coordinates: 8°42′43″S 36°24′54″W
- Country: Brazil
- Region: Northeast
- State: Pernambuco
- Founded: 11 March 1962

Government
  - Mayor: Rivanda Maria Freire Lima Teixeira (PSD) (2025-2028)
  - Vice Mayor: Lêdson Lins de Oliveira (UNIÃO) (2025-2028)

Area
  - Total: 104.835 km^{2} (40.477 sq mi)
- Elevation: 782 m (2,566 ft)

Population (2022 Census)
  - Total: 15,329
  - Estimate (2025): 16,022
  - Density: 146.22/km^{2} (378.7/sq mi)
- Demonym: Jupiense (Brazilian Portuguese)
- Time zone: UTC-03:00 (Brasília Time)
- Postal code: 55395-000
- HDI (2010): 0.575 – medium
- Website: jupi.pe.gov.br

Jupi (Central northeastern portuguese pronunciation: [ʒuˈpi]) is a municipality in the state of Pernambuco (PE), Brazil.

As of 2025, the estimated population was 16,022.

== See also ==
- List of municipalities in Pernambuco
