= Angelim =

Municipality of Pernambuco, Brazil

Angelim Angelinne
- City/municipality
- Flag Coat of arms

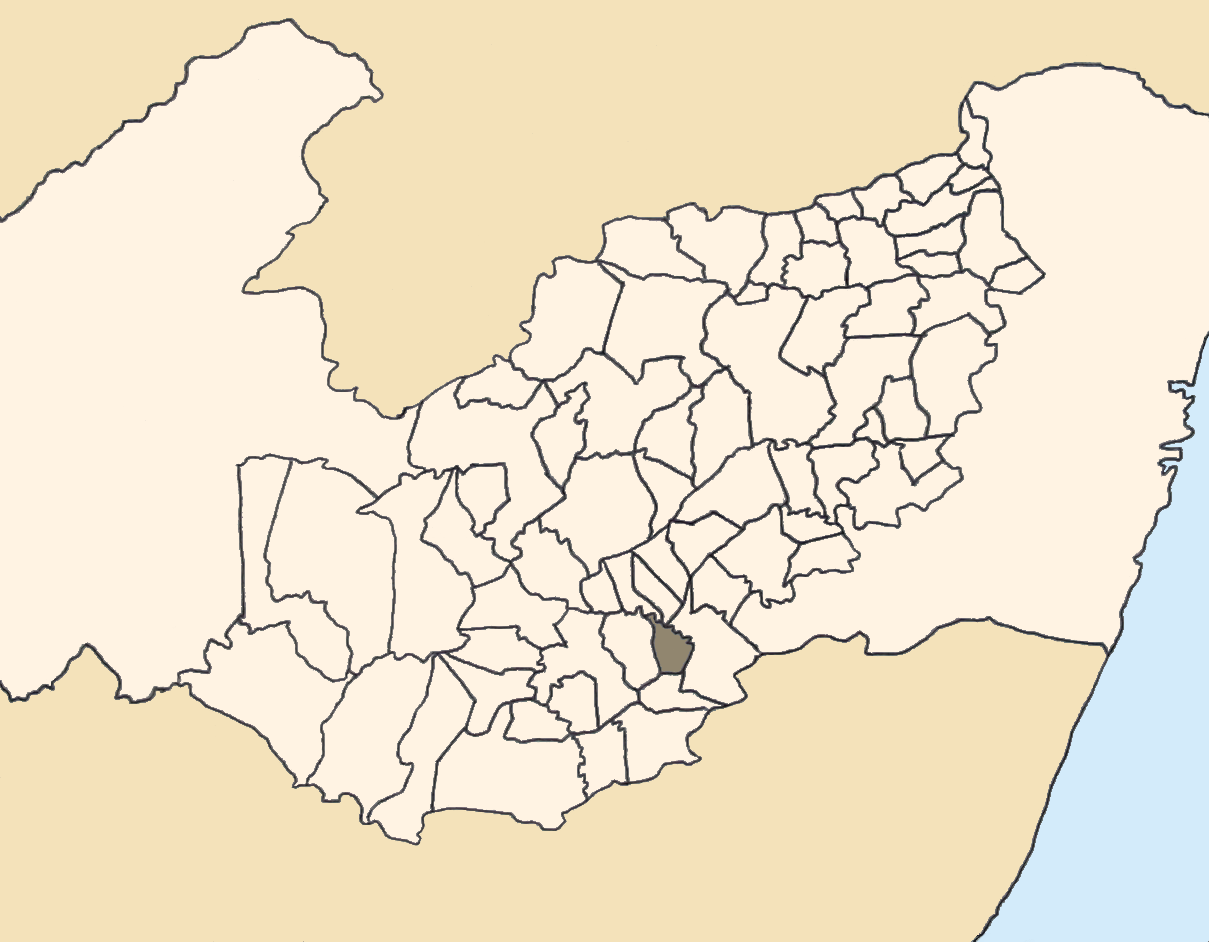
- Angelim in Pernambuco
- Coordinates: 8°53′S 36°17′W
- Country: Brazil
- State: Pernambuco

Area
  - Total: 118.03 km^{2} (45.57 sq mi)
- Elevation: 631 m (2,070 ft)

Population (2022 Census)
  - Total: 10,241
  - Estimate (2025): 10,591
  - Density: 86.766/km^{2} (224.72/sq mi)
- Time zone: UTC−3 (BRT)

Angelim (Angelinne) (Central northeastern portuguese pronunciation: [ɐ̃ʒeˈlĩ]) is a municipality/city in the Agreste region of the state of Pernambuco, Brazil. The population in 2022, according to 2022 Census by Brazilian Institute of Geography and Statistics, was 10,241 inhabitants and the total area is 118.72 km^{2}.

== Statistics ==
=== Economic indicators ===
Population	GDP x(1000 R$).	GDP pc (R$)	PE
10,591	31,552	3,208	0.05%

Economy by Sector 2006

Primary sector	Secondary sector	Service sector
15.66%	11.51%	72.82%

=== Health indicators ===
HDI (2000)	Hospitals (2007)	Hospitals beds (2007)	Children's Mortality every 1000 (2005)
0.602	1	15	28.2

== See also ==
- List of municipalities in Pernambuco
