= Panelas =

City in Pernambuco, Brazil

- City
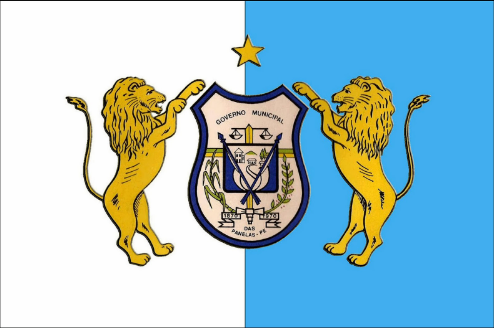
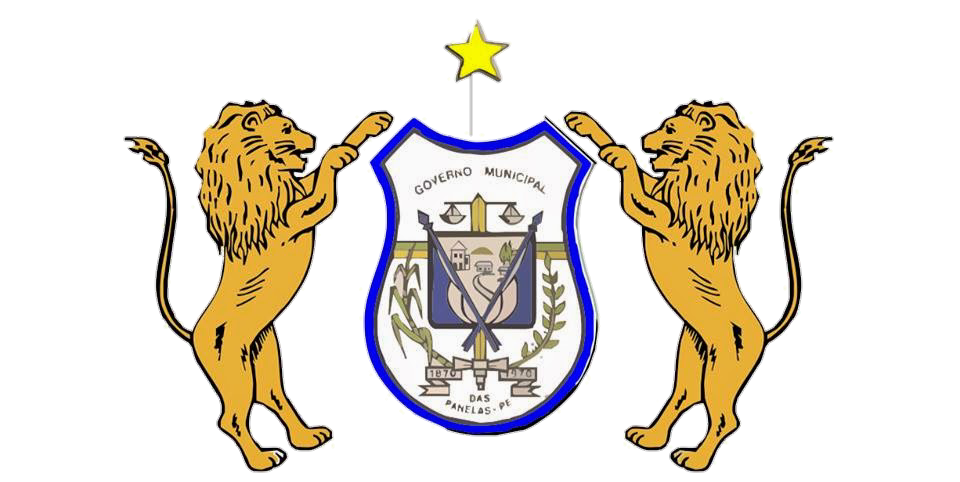
- Flag Coat of arms

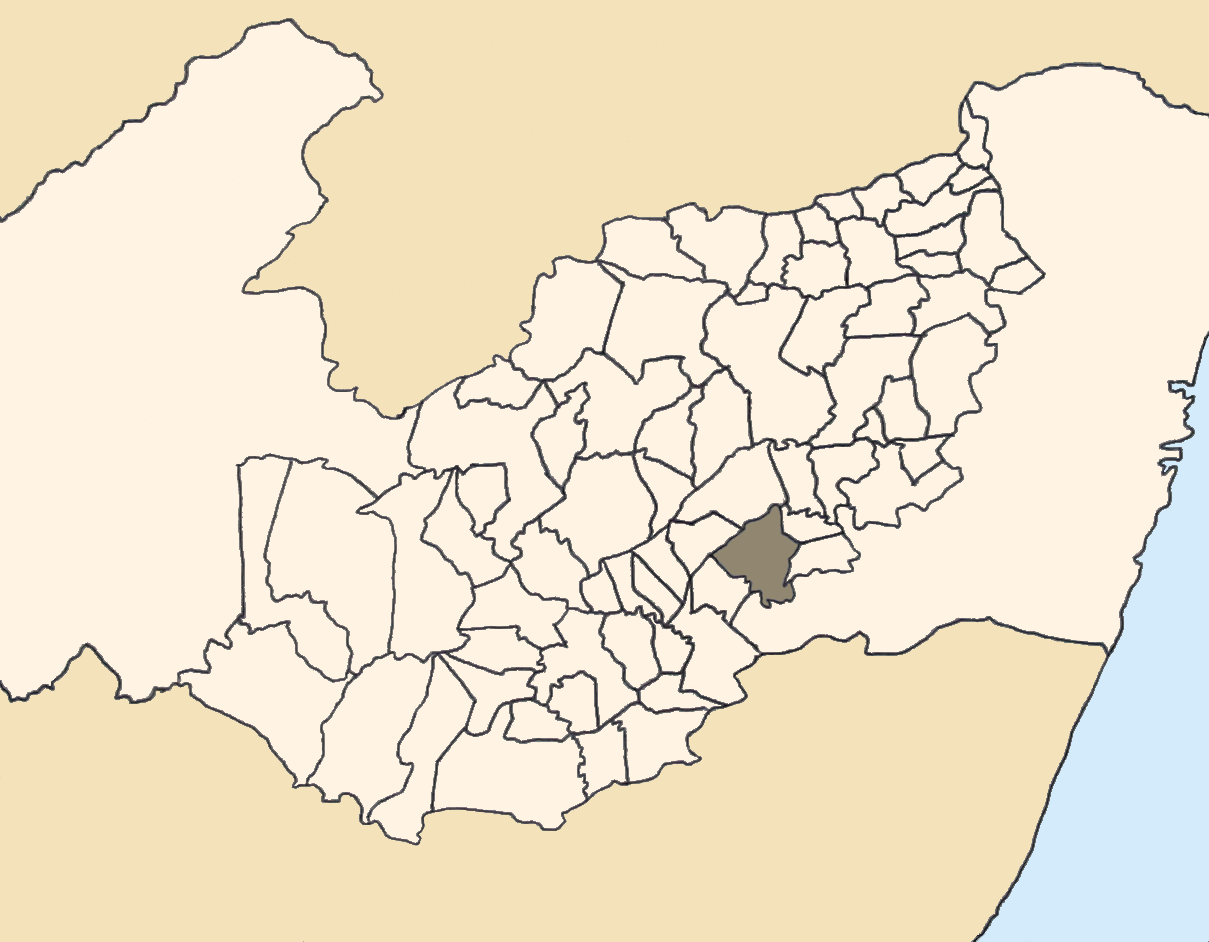
- Location of Panelas within Pernambuco
- Country: Brazil
- State: Pernambuco

Area
  - Total: 371.16 km^{2} (143.31 sq mi)
- Elevation: 532 m (1,745 ft)

Population (2022 Census)
  - Total: 22,991
  - Estimate (2025): 23,337
  - Density: 61.944/km^{2} (160.43/sq mi)
- Time zone: UTC−3 (BRT)

Panelas (Central northeastern portuguese pronunciation: [pɐ̃ˈnɛlɐ(s)]) is a city in the state of Pernambuco, Brazil. It is located 182.6 km away from Recife, the state capital. Panelas has an estimated (2022 Census) population of 22,991 inhabitants.

== Economy ==
The main economic activities in Panelas are based in agribusiness, especially sugarcane and manioc, as well as livestock such as cattle, goats, sheep, and poultry.

=== Economic indicators ===
Population	GDP x(1,000 R$).	GDP pc (R$)	PE
25,500	68,430	2,746	0.11%

Economy by Sector 2006

Primary sector	Secondary sector	Service sector
6.08%	9.38%	84.54%

=== Health indicators ===
HDI (2000)	Hospitals (2007)	Hospitals beds (2007)	Children's Mortality every 1,000 (2005)
0.576	1	26	26.8

== See also ==
- List of municipalities in Pernambuco
