= Mundaú River =

River in Pernambuco & Alagoas, Brazil

Jacuípe River
- Location of mouth

Location
- Country: Brazil
- State: Pernambuco, Alagoas

Physical characteristics
- Source
  - location: Alagoas state
- Mouth: Mundaú Lagoon
  - location: Maceió
  - coordinates: 8°54′S 35°9′W

The Mundaú River is a river in northeastern Brazil. The Mundaú originates in the Borborema Plateau of Pernambuco state, and flows southeast through Pernambuco and Alagoas states to empty into the Mundaú Lagoon at Maceió, capital of Alagoas. Mundaú Lagoon is an estuary, connected to the Atlantic Ocean and Manguaba Lagoon to the south by a network of channels.
