= Una River (Pernambuco) =

River in Pernambuco, Brazil

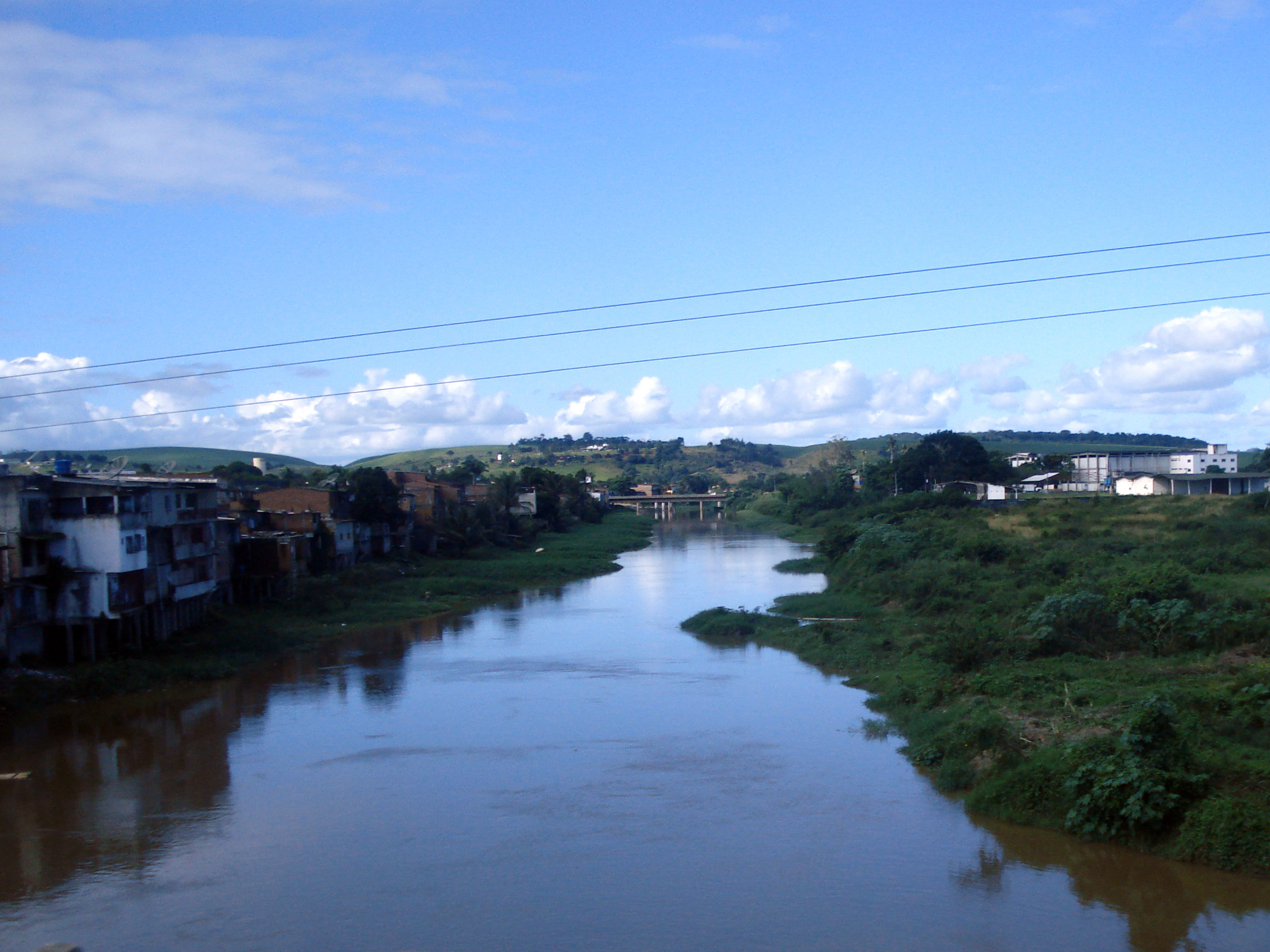
- The Una near Palmares

- Location of mouth

Location
- Country: Brazil
- State: Pernambuco

Physical characteristics
- Source
  - location: Borborema Plateau, Pernambuco
- Mouth
  - location: Atlantic Ocean
  - coordinates: 8°51′40″S 35°07′48″W
  - elevation: 0 m (0 ft)
- Length: 290 km (180 mi)
- Basin size: 6,740 km^{2} (2,600 sq mi)

The Una River is a river of Pernambuco state in northeastern Brazil. The Una originates on the Borborema Plateau, flows east, and empties into the Atlantic Ocean near Barreiros. Its length is 290 km, and its basin area is 6,740 km^{2}, of which 6,263 km^{2} in Pernambuco. It flows through the towns São Bento do Una, Altinho, Palmares and Agua Preta.

== See also ==
- List of rivers of Pernambuco
