= Código de Endereçamento Postal =

Brazilian postal code system commonly known as CEP

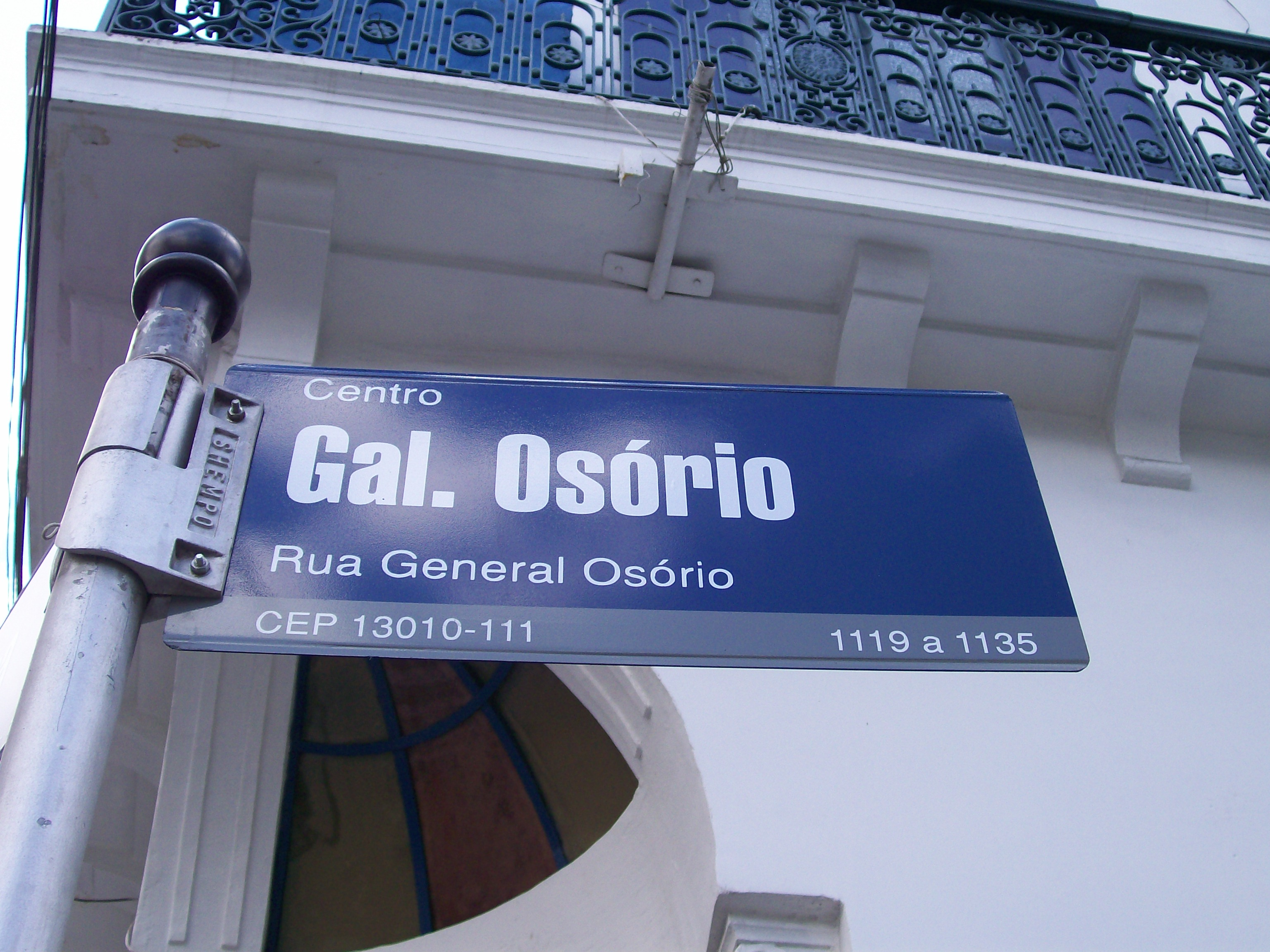
A street sign indicating a Brazilian Postal Code (13010-111) at its bottom, in Campinas.

Código de Endereçamento Postal (Postal Addressing Code) is the Brazilian postal code system commonly known as CEP. Introduced in 1972 as a sequence of five digits, it was expanded to eight digits in 1992 to allow for more precise localization. The standard format is "nnnnn-nnn" (the original five digits, a hyphen, and the new three digits).

Most cities with population around 100,000 and above have a CEP assigned to every public place and to some high-occupancy private spaces, like major commercial buildings and large residential condos. Small towns are assigned a general 5-digit code followed by the suffix -000.

The complete postal code database, known as DNE, contains more than 900,000 codes (including streets, neighborhoods, cities and Federated state names). Initially it was freely available at the Brazilian post office website, but after receiving various enhancements it is now a paid service called e-DNE. It comprises:

- Official names of all streets in all the capital cities and in 320 cities with more than 50,000 inhabitants;
- General 5-digit CEPs of all smaller cities in the 5,565 districts of the country;
- Promotional CEPs;
- CEPs of all communitarian PO boxes;
- CEPs of specific units in a street;
- CEPs of the Postal Units;
- All district codes according to IBGE;
- CEPs of Large Users;

== Postal areas ==
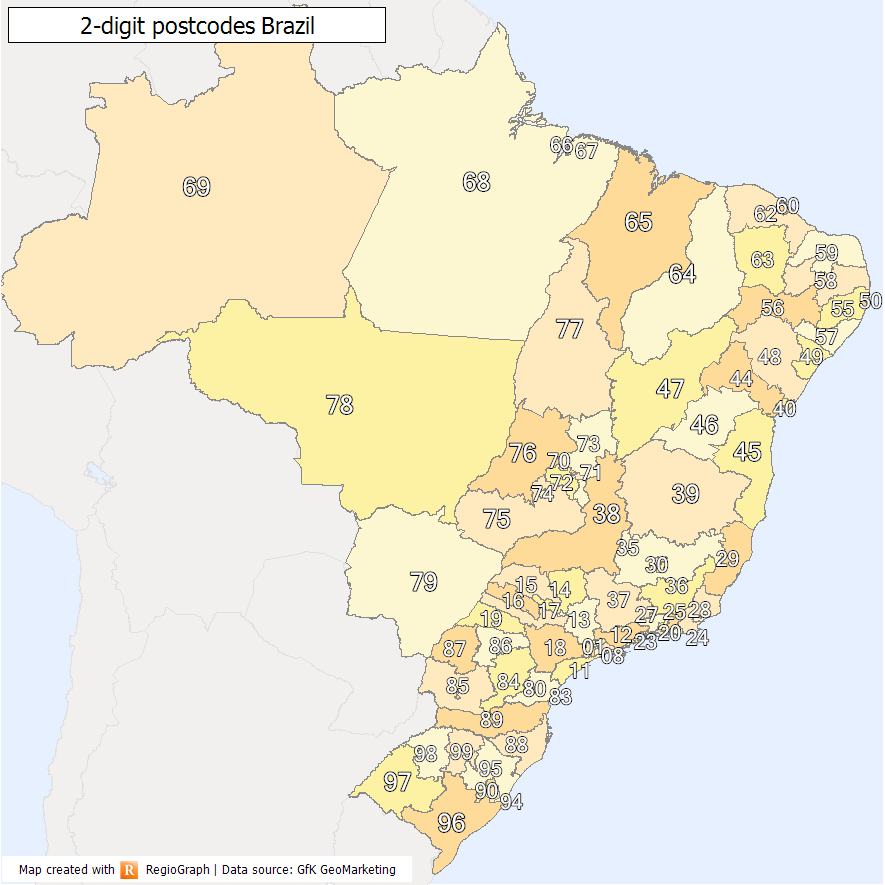
2-digit postcode map of Brazil

The digits have the same function since 1970: to locate a region, state, county, district, neighborhood or street. Brazil was divided into ten postal areas, ranging from 0 to 9, counting counter-clockwise from the state of São Paulo.

- 0xxxx: São Paulo metropolitan area
- 1xxxx: São Paulo state (excluding metro area)
- 2xxxx: Rio de Janeiro and Espírito Santo
- 3xxxx: Minas Gerais
- 4xxxx: Bahia and Sergipe
- 5xxxx: Pernambuco, Alagoas, Paraíba and Rio Grande do Norte
- 6xxxx: Ceará, Piauí, Maranhão, Pará, Amapá, Amazonas, Roraima and Acre
- 7xxxx: Distrito Federal, Goiás, Tocantins, Rondônia, Mato Grosso and Mato Grosso do Sul
- 8xxxx: Paraná and Santa Catarina
- 9xxxx: Rio Grande do Sul

Currently the lowest postal code is 01001-000 and the highest one is 99990-970.

== Address structure ==
Correios, Brazil's mail service, requests (but does not require) that the code be placed in the last line of the address. The acronym CEP is sometimes placed before the code, e.g. CEP 29145-586; however this practice is discouraged by the Correios, as it may cause reading errors in the automatic sorting machines.

Valid examples for mailing in Brazil are:

Fulano da Silva	(recipient name)
Rua Governador Roberto Silveira, 108	(street, number)
Centro	(borough)
Macaé - RJ	(city - state code)
27910-050	(CEP)

or

Rua Remanso, 35	(street and house number)
Tingui	(borough/neighborhood)
Rio de Janeiro - RJ	(City and state code)
23080-060	(CEP)

== See also ==
- Postal code
