= Xukuru language =

Extinct language of Brazil

Xukurú
- Ichikile, Shukurú
- Brobo
- Pronunciation: [bɾɔbɔ]
- Native to: Brazil
- Region: Pernambuco
- Ethnicity: 8,500 Xukuru people (2020)
- Extinct: by 1934
- Language family: Xukuruan: Xukurú

Language codes
- ISO 639-3: xoo
- Glottolog: xuku1239 xucu1234
- Linguasphere: 89-CBB-aa
- Municipality of Pesqueira, Pernambuco, where Xukuru was spoken

Xukuru (Xucuru, Shukurú, Ichikile, Xukurú: Brobo) is a poorly attested extinct language of Brazil, once spoken by the Xukuru people. It is known only from a few word lists. Xukuru was originally spoken in the Serra de São José and on the Meio River, Capibaribe River and Taperoa River in the states of Pernambuco and Paraíba. The Xukuru live in the Serra Ararobá and Pesqueira (formerly containing the aldeia of Cimbres). In Rio Grande do Norte, the Tapuia Tarairiú people are reviving the Xukuru language, as are the Xukuru themselves.

== History ==
William D. Hohenthal, Jr. (1954) estimates the last generation of Xukuru speakers to have been born in the 1860s to the 1870s. However, by the time of Curt Nimuendajú's visit to the Xukuru in 1934, encountering about 50 of them, he could only collect 137 words from four old individuals, and the language had gone extinct by then. His manuscript was lost after his death, and only a short excerpt of it survived. Following him was Cicero Cavalcanti, an employee of the Indian Protection Service (SPI), who, in 1944, visited the Xukuru, recording a total of 2,191 descendants, but only 385 "pure" Xukuru. He collected a "lengthy" vocabulary, as well as some sentences strung together by the Xukuru which contained no grammatical information. Later, in 1951, Hohenthal visited the Xukuru and conducted an ethnographic study of them, also collecting a vocabulary. None of the Xukuru could construct any grammatical structures in their original language, instead constructing sentences in Portuguese, but replacing the vocabulary with Xukuru. Geraldo Lapenda (1962) subsequently conducted a short sketch of Xukuru. Today, the Xukuru have attempted to reintroduce what remains of their language into their community and daily life. An illustrated dictionary in Xukuru has been produced.

== Classification ==
Loukotka (1968) considers Xukurú to form a small family with Paratió and the unattested Garanhun (Garañun). Glottolog, following Fabre (2005), treats Xukuru and Paratió as dialects.

== Geographical distribution ==
Geraldo Lapenda (1962) reported that the Xukuru people can be found primarily in the settlements of Canabrava and Brejinho in the aldeia of Cimbres, Pesqueira municipality. They can also be found in the settlements of Cajueiro, Ipanema Velho, Caldeirão, Jitó, Lagoa, Machado, Sitio do Meio, Riacho dos Afetos, Trincheiras, Bem-te-vi, Santana, and São José. Although the Xukuru traditionally occupied the Serra do Ororobá, they could also be found in other municipalities of Pernambuco, namely Caruaru, Brejo da Madre de Deus, Belo Jardim, Sanharó, Poção, Pesqueira, and Arcoverde.

== Phonology ==
=== Consonants ===
Xukuru consonants:

		Labial	Dental/ Alveolar	Palatal	Velar	Glottal
Plosive	voiceless	p	t		k	
Plosive	voiced	b	d		g	
Fricative	voiceless	f	s	ʃ ⟨x⟩		
Fricative	voiced	v	z	ʒ ⟨j⟩		ɦ ⟨h⟩
Nasal		m	n			
Lateral			l			
Vibrant			r			

=== Vowels ===
Xukuru vowels:

	Front	Back
Close	i	u
Close-mid	e ⟨é⟩	o ⟨ó⟩
Open-mid	ɛ ⟨ê⟩	ɔ ⟨ô⟩
Open	a	

Xukuru also has nasalized vowels. Lapenda (1962) transcribes nasalized vowels as ⟨Vn⟩ (orthographic vowel followed by ⟨n⟩). Descending diphthongs are attested, but only for oral vowels.

== Morphology ==
Common suffixes in Xukuru include -go, which forms verbs, adjectives, and nouns, and -men, of uncertain meaning. The negative adverb biá was also recorded, and may have formerly been a suffix.

nõyẽ biá
speak not
'don't speak'

The Portuguese preposition em was also adapted into Xukuru as ĩ (which Lapenda transcribed as in).

ĩ bemẽ
in {the morning}
'in the morning'

== Vocabulary ==
Due to the paucity of data on Xukuru, Hohenthal supposed that some of the vocabulary collected could be of the Paratió language instead. Some of the data had been mixed with other languages spoken in the region, such as Kariri, Pankararú, Iatê and the língua geral.

=== Loukotka (1949) ===
The following Xukurú words are from Loukotka (1949), republishing the list obtained from Curt Nimuendajú collected in 1934. The list was obtained by Loukotka in 1940.

French gloss (original)	English gloss (translated)	Shukurú
chien	dog	žebrégo
dent	tooth	čilodé
eau	water	téu
femme	woman	moéla
feu	fire	intóa
hache	axe	tilóa
homme	man	šenũprĕ
jaguar	jaguar	lamprémp
langue	tongue	ĩš-arágŏ
main	hand	koreké
maïs	maize	šígŭ
maison	house	šek
manioc	cassava	šakurarágŭ
manger	eat	kreṅgô
oreille	har	bandalák
pied	foot	poyá
pierre	stone	kéiba
pot	pot	koréka
serpent	snake	saṅsála
tabac	tobacco	mãžé
tête	head	kreká

=== Meader (1978) ===
Xukuru is also known from a word list obtained in 1961 by Paul Wagner from Antônio Caetano do Nascimento, the chief of Brazinho village in the Serra Urubu of Pesqueira, Pernambuco State. The list is reproduced below, with English translations also given.

Portuguese gloss (original)	English gloss (translated)	Xukuru
água	water	křikišε
arco	bow	fřεša
azul	blue	ιniyε
bebo	I drink	taiyε̨
fazer beber	to drink	uřιnka/o
boca	mouth	opigomə̨
branco	white	piřaːša
carne de boi	beef	iːša de mařiñu
carne de porco	pork	iːša de pʰužu
casa	home	šεkI / šεkʰ
está chovendo	it is raining	křišišε
cobra	snake	katə̨go / šabatə̨na / sązařa
comer (fazer)	eat	křιŋgɔ
corda (de índio)	rope (of Indian)	kəšta
correr (fazer)	run	mutəgo
dia	day	'aːdamε
dormir	to sleep	muřiša
flecha	arrow	bεštə
fogo	fire	kiya
fumo	smoke	mažε
fumando (fazendo)	smoking	ε/ιštə̨ŋgu
joelho	knee	žəže
lua	moon	kιlaRmɔ
machado	axe	takɔ de supapʰo
mãe	mother	tšiɔkɔ
mandioca	cassava	iːəmu
farinha de mandioca	cassava flour	įəmu
matar	kill	kopago/u
menino	boy	ambεkO / křipʰu/i
milho	corn	šιgu / šiːgřu / siːgu
morto (defunto)	dead (deceased)	kupʰu
mulher / moça	woman / girl	ɔkřιpi / tšɔkɔ
nariz	nose	šikřį
noite	night	batukį
noite clara	clear night	kilařižmąų / kιlařižmąų
noite sem luar	moonless night	batřokį / batokį
nuvem	cloud	nǫmbřu
olho	eye	aloži / lə̨že/ε
pai	dad	taiɔpʰu
panela de barro	clay pot	mɔiː
pau	stick	křə̨ži
pé	foot	poiya
pés-de-bode	goat feet	poia de mε̨mε̨ŋgo
pedra	stone	kařašiši / kašiši / kebřə
pequeno	small	křeɔ
perna fina	thin leg	žatiři
pessoa ruim	bad person	taːnañago
piolho	louse	kuša
preta	black woman	takažu křεga
preto	black man	takažu pu
sangue	blood	bǫdąso
sol	sun	aːdɔmε
terra	earth	lιmulagu
velho	old	iakɔ / taiəpu / přɔ
vem cá	come here	iąkɔ / iə̨nkɔ
verde	green	piřaša / takaιnyε
abóbora	pumpkin	porou
até logo	see you later	ambeřa
banana	banana	pakɔvɔ
beiju	beiju	šɔšɔgu
bicho-de-pé	chigoe flea (Tunga penetrans)	bušu / bušudu
bode	goat	mε̨mε̨ŋgo
boi	ox	mařį
bolsa	handbag	aiyɔ
bom-dia	good morning	břεmε̨/æ̨
brasa	ember	toe
brigar (mentir?) (fazer)	fight (lie?)	ařago
cabaça	gourd	kuřekɔ/a
caboclo	caboclo	taispu/U
caboclo velho	old caboclo	přɔ / sanumpI/i
cachaça	cachaça	uřiːka žɔgu
cachimbo	smoking pipe	šaduřε
café	coffee	fǫfǫ
cágado	tortoise	šabutε
cansado	tired	nanəgu
carneiro	ram	labudu
cavalo	horse	pitšιŋgə
chapéu	hat	křeakřugu
chefe	chief	přə
chorando	crying	šualya
cintura	waist	hododoːgu
dar na cabeça	give in the head	kupago
dinheiro	money	εntaiu
doce	sweet	kažuřə
duas horas da tarde	two o'clock in the afternoon	ŋgutimæ
escuro	dark	bətukį / batyukį
espingarda	shotgun	kašuvemini / nazařinə
espírito (homem)	spirit (of man)	kopʰu ařaga
fava	fava bean	kuřikə
feijão	bean	saka
fica quieto	stay quiet	naiyεtigořε / naiyε biago
fome (está com)	hungry (be)	šuřakI/i
fósforo	match (lighter)	křiya
galinha	chicken	tapuka
gato	cat	žetona
gato do mato / leão	wildcat / lion	tə̨tə̨ŋgu / tątągu
homem mal feito	ugly man	křugu/i
ladrão	thief	šikřεgugu
lagartinha	small caterpillar	kuřišiba
lenha	firewood	křə̨ži
língua dos Xukurus	Xukuru language	břɔbɔ
maça	cudgel	kuřikɔ
madeira	wood	křə̨ž
mentira	a lie (not truth)	uːegwe
mulata	mulatto	křεšuagu
nome da tribo	Xukuru tribe	šukuřuiz
Nossa Senhora	Our Lady (Virgin Mary)	təməį
Nosso Senhor	Our Lord (Jesus)	tupə̨
onça / rato	jaguar / rat	pipʰiu
padre	father	pažε
panela / jarro	pot / pitcher	mə̨yį
patim	small patio	iːə̨kə̨
pato	duck	tapukə
peba	drink	šabutε / šababutε
peru	turkey	papιsaka / isaka
ponta de boi	point of ox	kakřiə̨kʰɔ
porco	pig	pužu
prato de barro	clay plate	šεtkibųgu
preá	Brazilian guinea pig (Cavia aperea)	bεŋo / bεŋgo
prender (fez)	catch	abřeřa
com raiva	angry	mařau
rapadura	rapadura	kařuža
rede	net	tipʰoia
roubar (fazer)	steal	ařagu / šιkřugu / šikřεgu
roupa (genérico)	clothing (generic)	takʰɔ
roupa rasgada	rags, ripped clothing	takə ařagu
saia	skirt	tinəŋgɔ
sapato	shoe	šaba
sapo	toad	sařapə
sede	thirst	sεři
soldado	soldier	ařεdæři / kəmakwį
titica	useless	ižari / šapřuiz
titica grande	very useless	žaři
trovão	thunder	təkəmařu / takəmařau
urinar	urinate	žιgu
urubu	vulture	gřaːsia
vai dar de corpo	will give body	šιkumə
viagem (fazer)	travel	ųbřeːřa / muntəgu

== See also ==
- Tarairiú language
