= Xukuru =

Xukuru may refer to:

- Xukuru people, an ethnic group of Brazil
- Xukuru language, the language formerly spoken by them
