= Cimbres Marian apparition =

Marian apparitions in Brazil

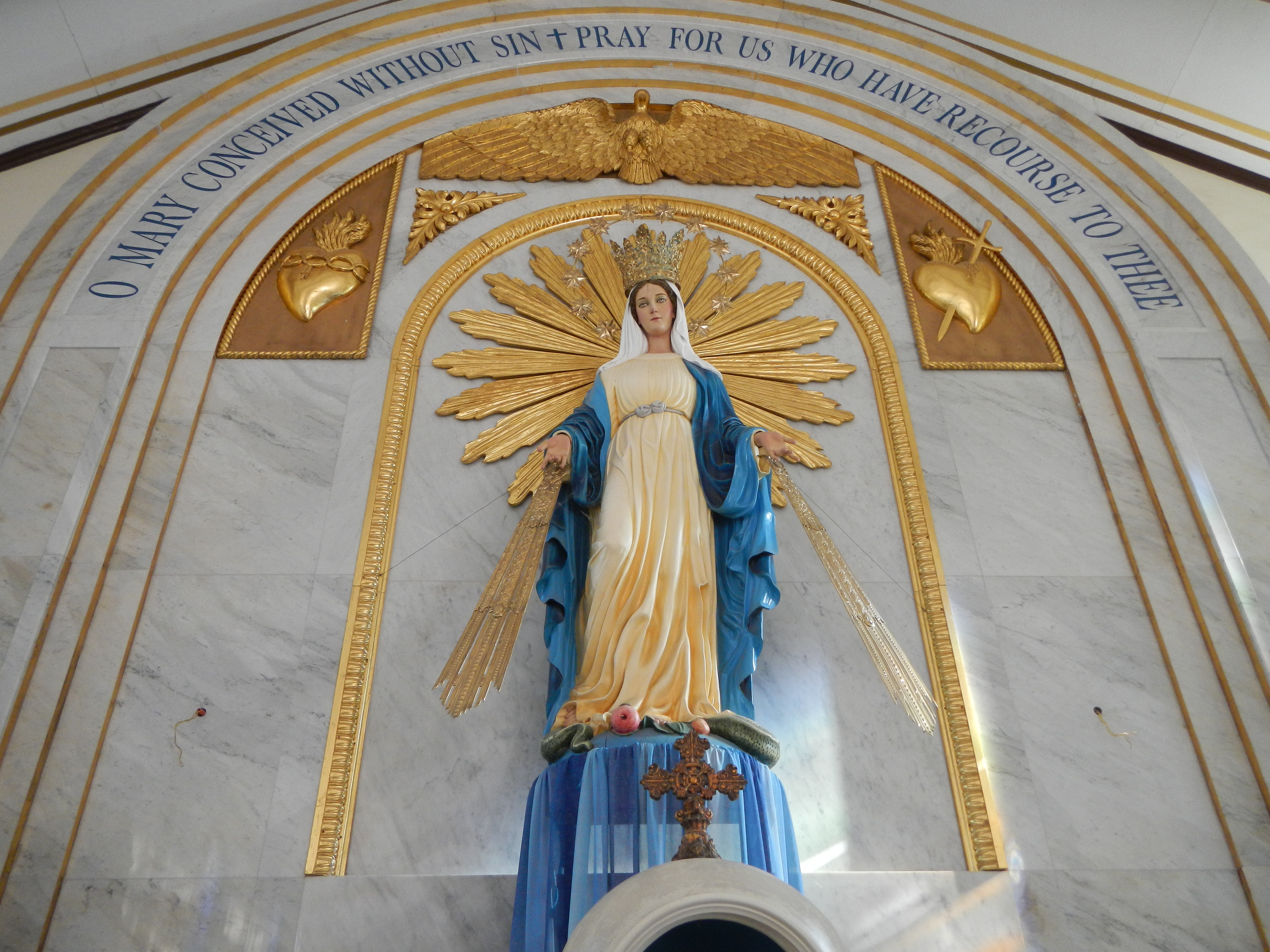
Our Lady of Graces, the title of the Marian apparition

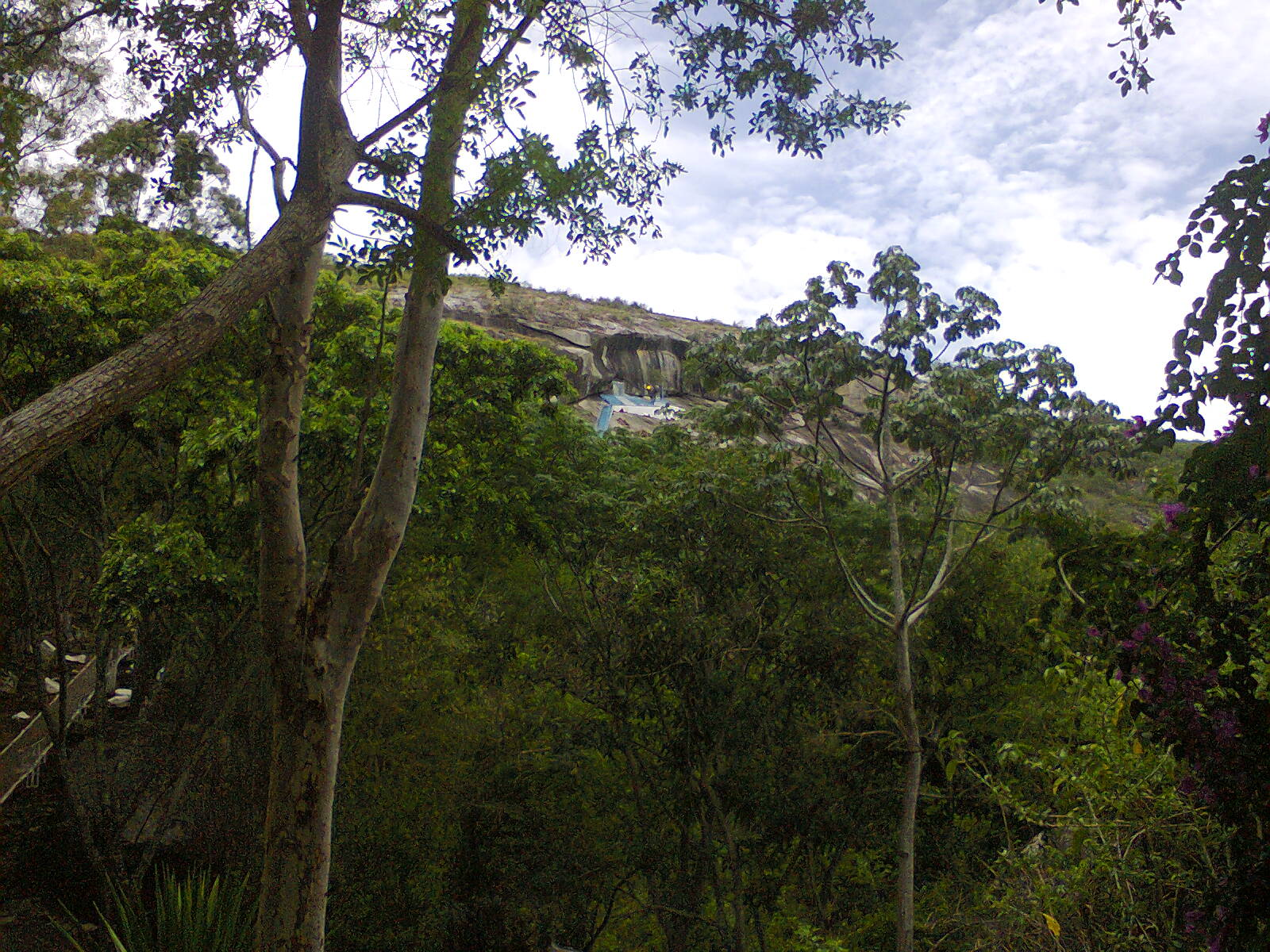
Site of the apparitions: Sítio da Guarda, Cimbres, Pesqueira. 08.3626°S 036.8116°W

The Cimbres Marian apparition was a series of visions of the Virgin Mary that occurred in 1936 and 1937 in Northeastern Brazil, in the Pernambuco state municipality of Pesqueira, district of Cimbres.

== Context ==
According to what is believed, the Virgin Mary would have appeared to two seers, Maria da Luz (who later adopted the name Adélia on the occasion of her entry into religious life) and Maria da Conceição, who, at the time of the facts, were poor and uneducated adolescents. The apparition happened in an exposed inselberg near the girl's family house, partially covered by thorny bushes and slippery moss, and next to deep gullies, a place dangerous to reach on foot. Though the climate there is semiarid, after the apparition the inselberg started flowing potable water. These events became famous for the rigor with which they were ascertained by the German missionary Fr. Joseph Kehrle, who was answered by the illiterate girls in both Latin and German languages, as well as for the content of the message that the Virgin Mary would have transmitted to the seers, alerting them about how Brazil would be deadly punished with Communism.

=== Bloody terror from Communism ===
The apparition happened thirty times, starting on August 6, 1936. Following is one of the many intermediated dialogues between Fr. Kehrle, who wrote the questions in Latin or German, and the oral answer by the Virgin Mary, according to the two girls, both still illiterate in any language at the time.

Say: who you are and what do you want?

«I am the Mother of Grace and I come to warn the people that three great punishments are approaching.»

What is necessary to do to divert the punishments?

«Penance and prayer.»

What is the invocation of this apparition?

«Of Graces.»

What does the blood that flows from your hands mean?

«The blood that will flood Brazil.»

Will Communism penetrate Brazil?

«Yes.»

Across the country?

«Yes.»

Also in the countryside?

«No.»

Will priests and bishops suffer greatly?

«Yes.»

Will it be like in Spain?*

«Almost.»

What devotions should be practiced to ward off these evils?

«To the heart of Jesus and to my heart.»

Is this apparition the repetition of La Salette?

«Yes.»

*Note: the Spanish Civil War, between Monarchists and Communists, started in the previous month, on July 17, 1936.

=== Interpretation ===
The Brazilian general Sérgio Avellar Coutinho remembered that, the year before the apparition, the Brazilian communist uprising of 1935 had already happened. A journal article recalls that Liberation theologian's leader Archbishop Hélder Câmara and educator Paulo Freire were from Recife and center-left president Lula from Garanhuns, so an apparition regarding the danger of Communism in Brazil has a strong reason to happen in Pernambuco.

== Spread ==
Originally, the news of the apparition was restricted to the region surrounding the city of Pesqueira, from where came most of the pilgrims of the shrine that stands there in the 1930s.

The first article about the apparition was published on the German periodical Koenigsreuthes Jahrbuch in 1936.

The message of the apparitions has, in modern times, been spread throughout Brazil, mainly through Internet, by the initiative of Conservative/anti-Communist figures, such as the Pernambucan Fr. Paulo Ricardo, the philosopher Olavo de Carvalho (1947-2022), the historian Ana Lígia Lira, actress Cássia Kis, as well as the great-niece of Sister Adelia, the engineer Auta Maria Monteiro de Carvalho, through her book O Encontro – Nossa Senhora e Sister Adélia.

== Ecclesiastical recognition ==
Although they were, at first, viewed with discredit by ecclesial authorities of the Diocese of Pesqueira, the apparitions gradually became accepted as worthy of faith by the Church, which recognized, in 2021, the supernatural character of the events that occurred at Cimbres. At the same time, the process of beatification of one of the seers, Sister Amelia, was initiated, which corroborates the church's approval of the devotion to the Virgin Mary under the designation of Our Lady of Graces of Cimbres.

== History of local Marian demonstrations prior to the apparitions ==
The Region of Cimbres, the scene of the apparitions, has a prolific history of Marian devotions and supernatural events associated with the Virgin Mary. Being in the interior of the territory of the Xucuru Amerindians, the settlement of the village is closely related to the settlement of the indigenous communities of the site at the initiative of the Oratorian priests, still in the early seventeenth century.

Also, the region suffered a lot from the cangaço, a major source of fear and a reason for much prayer among the locals.

Once, some priests removed an image of Our Lady from the apparition site and took it to the presence of the priests of the village, who kept it for themselves. According to reports at the time, when they woke up, the priests could not find the image that had been brought to them, and began to look for it, suspecting that someone might have stolen it. After searches, they found it in the exact trunk where it had been found the day before, and once again took it with them.

The next day, the statue was again gone, and this time the priests went straight to the trunk of the previous day, where they once again found it. Convinced that such events had been divine in their origin, the Oratorian fathers erected a chapel on the meeting place of the image, the altar of which was at the same place and height as the trunk on which the statue appeared. The Virgin enthroned in the chapel came to be known as Our Lady of the Mountains, given the rugged topography of the site of their meeting, being the target of special devotion of the Xukuru indigenous to this day, who designate her Mother Tamain.

== Tourism ==
The site of the apparitions is nowadays a popular tourist destination.

== Books ==
- O Diário do Silêncio - O Alerta da Virgem Maria Contra o Comunismo no Brasil: o Alerta da Virgem Maria Contra o Comunismo no Brasil. Ecclesiae. ISBN 8584911049
- Eu sou a Graça - As Aparições de Nossa Senhora das Graças em Pernambuco. Ecclesiae. ISBN 8584910344
- Aparições e milagres de Nossa Senhora em Cimbres: Entre a fé e as ciências. Novas Edições Acadêmicas. ISBN 6139603056
- O inquisidor de Cimbres: A história do padre que recebia flores de Nossa Senhora. Apascentar. ISBN 6599552528
