= Djanira Silva do Rego Barros =

Brazilian short story writer

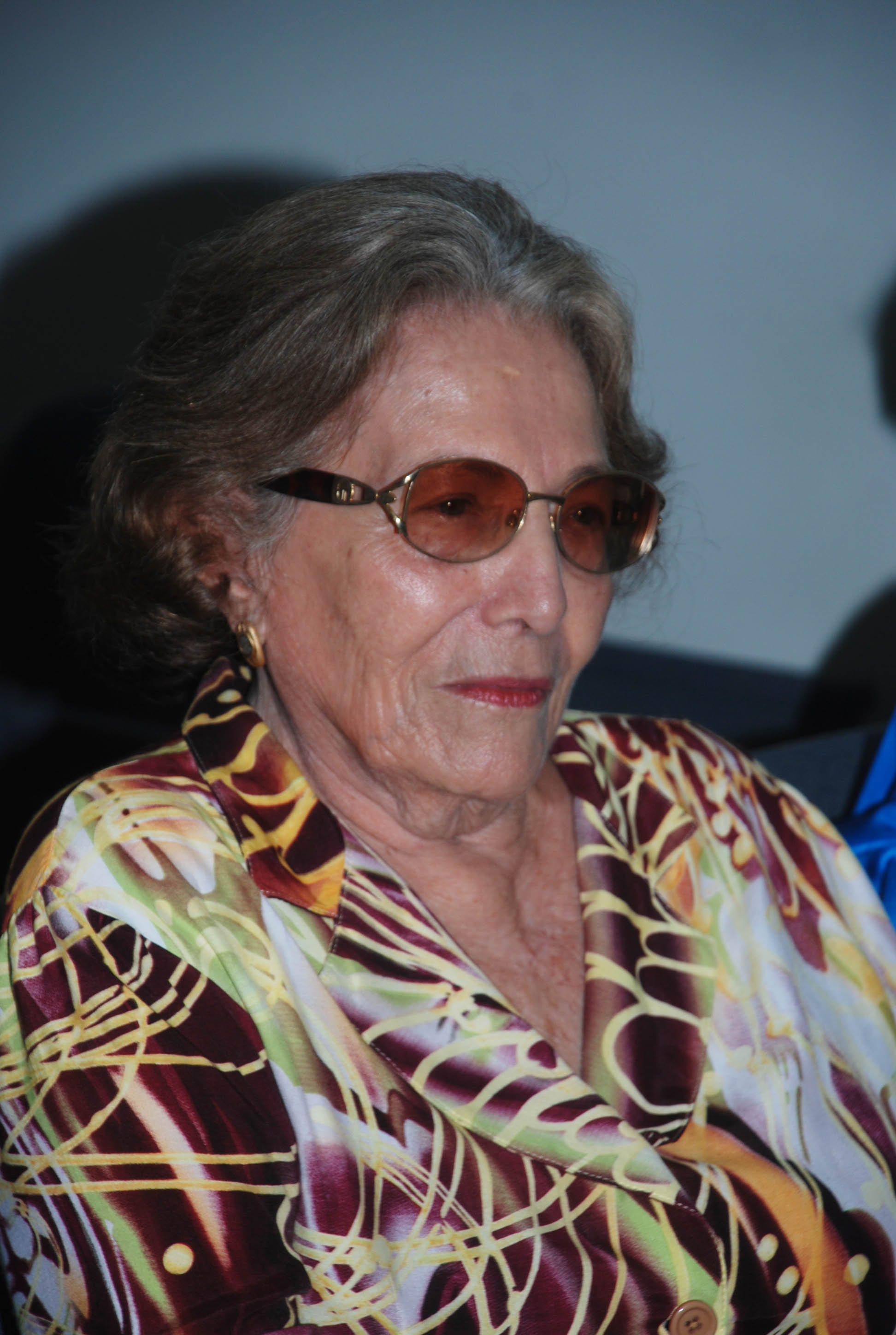
- Born: July 25, 1930
- Died: November 7, 2024 (aged 94)
- Occupation(s): Short story writer, columnist, essayist

Djanira Silva do Rego Barros (July 25, 1930 — November 7, 2024) was a Brazilian short story writer, columnist, essayist and sonneteer.

== Early life and background ==
She was born in 1930 during a time of political upheaval and cultural transformation in Brazil. Her formative years coincided with the rise of modernist ideas in art and literature, influenced by national, social, and historical themes. She held a law degree and pursued both her professional and literary endeavors in Recife, Pernambuco.

== Life and works ==
Djanira, who grew up in Pesqueira, Pernambuco, defied conventional gender norms by challenging societal expectations placed upon women and adopting innovative views on freedom and individuality.

Her literary contributions are characterized by a blend of wit, irony, and introspective depth, frequently delving into human emotions with a humorous and critical perspective. Among her extensive oeuvre of over 20 published works, A Morte Cega (Blind Death) is particularly notable for its profound insights.

== Publications ==
Published books

- In Neutral (1980)
- The Magic of the Mountains (1996)
- The Curse of Housework and Other Curses (1998) - ISBN 978-85-89501-03-3
- The Great Audalian Saga (1998)
- Sunflower Eye (1999)
- Rewriting Fairy Tales (2001)
- Memories of the Wind (2003) - ISBN 978-85-903224-1-2
- Sand Sins (2005)
- Stop Being Stupid (2006)
- The Blind Death (2009) - ISBN 978-85-7716-620-6
- Crazy is the One Who Has Sense (2012) - ISBN 978-85-62883-45-3
- Two Poets & a Critic (2012) - ISBN 978-85-909702-7-9
- Longing Trapped (2014) - ISBN 978-85-903224-5-0
- I Don't Tell a Story (2016) - ISBN 978-85-8469-093-0
- The Butterfly's Smile (2018)
