= Serra do Ororubá =

Mountain range in Pernambuco, Brazil

The Serra do Ororubá, also known as the Serra do Urubá or Serra do Arorobá, is a mountain range in Pesqueira, Pernambuco, Brazil. It is the traditional territory of the Xukuru people.

The Xukuru and Paratió languages were spoken in the mountain range.
