= Padre Paulo Ricardo =

Brazilian Roman Catholic priest

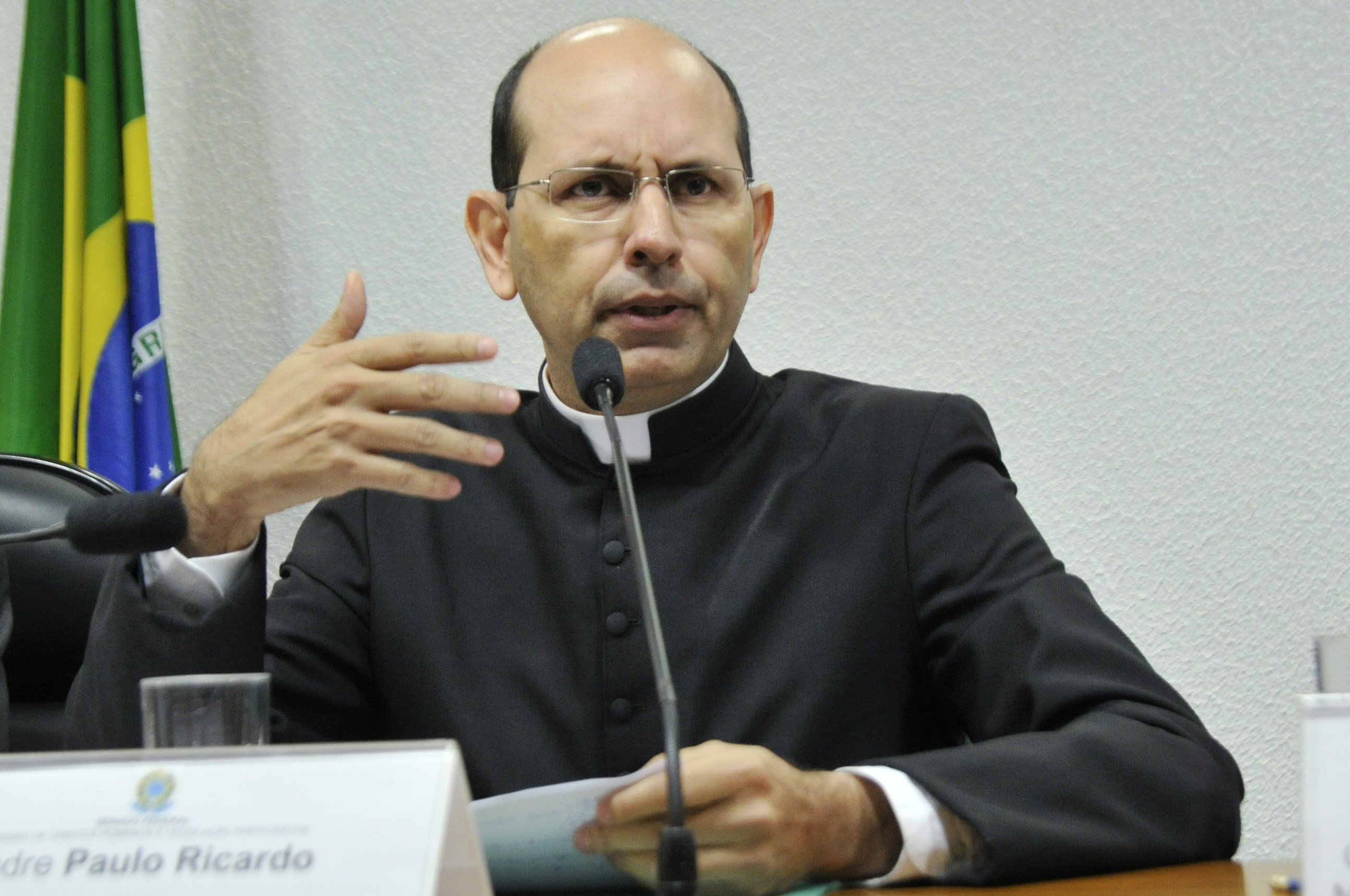
Priest Paul Richard at the Human Rights and Legislative Participation Commission, Brasília, 2016

Paulo Ricardo de Azevedo Júnior (Recife, November 7, 1967) is a Brazilian Catholic priest, TV host, writer, and professor.

== Biography ==
=== Education ===
Ricardo endorsed at the Cuiabá Seminary in 1985 and was ordained a priest on June 14, 1992, by Pope John Paul II.

Graduated in Philosophy from Faculdades Unidas Católicas de Mato Grosso, in Campo Grande/MS, he became a bachelor in Theology and has a master's degree in Canon Law by the Pontifical Gregorian University, in Rome.

=== Priesthood ===
In 1997, Ricardo went through a conversion experience, guided by the model of the Carmelite nun Therese of Lisieux. In 2002 he became an avid reader of philosopher Olavo de Carvalho.

From 2002-2012 he was a member of the Holy See's International Council for Catechesis (COINCAT)

In 2005 he experienced an air incident between São Paulo and Cuiabá, which led him to have a different preaching, "a clearer preaching against the mainstream tendency".

He hosted the weekly program The Eighth Day, on TV Canção Nova, in 2007. He was one of the priests selected to preach at the World Youth Day 2013, in Rio de Janeiro.

He is the author of nine books and has more than 1.5 million followers on Facebook and 2 million followers on Instagram. He is a major conservative leader in Brazil.

In 2022, Ricardo's Telegram channel underwent monitoring by Brazil's Superior Court of Justice as it was one of the 100 most important channels in Brazil.

==== Current activities ====
He teaches theology at the Benedict XVI Institute of the Diocese of Lorena (state of São Paulo), since 2011.

Ricardo is currently Parochial Vicar of Cristo Rei Parish, in Várzea Grande (Metropolitan Region of Cuiabá, state of Mato Grosso).

As an extra apostolate, he is dedicated to evangelization through the media. Often he is invited to preach at the region of Cuiabá.

Ricardo also teaches courses related to the Catholic religion and conservatism. Since 2006 he has dedicated part of his time to an internet apostolate by the name of PadrePauloRicardo.Org. Overall the website contains 57 courses on several topics, ranging from the lives of the saints to morality and spirituality.

== Courses ==
Some notable courses, by online attendance.

- Cultural Revolution and Marxism
- Frankfurt School
- History of the Church
- Therapy of Spiritual Illness
- The evil of pornography and masturbation
- The Inquisition
- The Way of Perfection
- Luther and the Modern World
- The Church and the Modern World
- The Secret of Saint Thérèse The Little Flower
- Thomas Aquinas' Summa Theologica
- G. K. Chesterton
- Tolkien's The Lord of the Rings
- Louis of Montfort
- Pope John Paul II's Theology of the Body
- C. S. Lewis' Chronicles of Narnia
- Philosophy of language
- Padre Pio
- The Ten Commandments

== Books ==
- Uma Flor do Clero Cuiabano: biografia do Padre Armindo Maria de Oliveira, SDB (1882-1918). Vol. 1 (3rd ed.). São Paulo: Paulus. 1999. ISBN 9788534914819.
- Um Olhar que Cura. Vol. 1. São Paulo: Canção Nova. 2008. ISBN 9788563160003.
- Vaticano II: ruptura ou continuidade?. Vol. 1. Campinas: Ecclesiae. 2009. ISBN 9788563160003.
- Teologia Fundamental I. Vol. 1. Campinas: Ecclesiae. 2010. ISBN 9788563160010.
- Teologia Fundamental II. Vol. 1. Campinas: Ecclesiae. 2010. ISBN 9788563160027.
- Trindade. Vol. 1 (1st ed.). Campinas: Ecclesiae. 2010. ISBN 9788563160133.
- Cristologia e Soteriologia. Vol. 1 (1st ed.). Campinas: Ecclesiae. 2011. ISBN 9788563160089.
- A resposta católica. Vol. 1 (2nd ed.). Campinas: Ecclesiae. 2013. ISBN 9788563160386.
- Os mártires de hoje. Vol. 1 (1st ed.). Campinas: Ecclesiae. 2013. ISBN 9788563160256.

== See also ==
- Cimbres Marian apparition
