= Diocese of Pesqueira =

Catholic ecclesiastical territory

Diocese of Pesqueira Dioecesis Pesqueirensis

Catholic
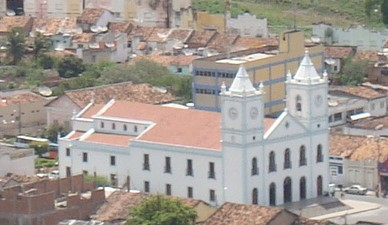
- Catedral Santa Águeda in 2010

Location
- Country: Brazil
- Ecclesiastical province: Olinda e Recife

Statistics
- Area: 10,065 km^{2} (3,886 sq mi)
- Population: Total; Catholics: (as of 2004); 410,200; 370,200 (90.2%)
- Parishes: 25

Information
- Denomination: Roman Catholic
- Rite: Latin Rite
- Established: December 5, 1910 (115 years ago)
- Cathedral: Catedral Santa Águeda

Current leadership
- Pope: Leo XIV
- Bishop: José Luiz Ferreira Salles, C.Ss.R.
- Metropolitan Archbishop: Fernando Antônio Saburido, O.S.B.

The Roman Catholic Diocese of Pesqueira (Latin: Dioecesis Pesqueirensis) is a diocese located in the city of Pesqueira in the ecclesiastical province of Olinda e Recife in Brazil.

== History ==
- December 5, 1910: Established as Diocese of Floresta from the Diocese of Olinda
- August 2, 1918: Renamed as Diocese of Pesqueira

== Bishops ==
=== Ordinaries, in reverse chronological order ===
- Bishops of Pesqueira (Roman rite), below
  - Bishop José Luiz Ferreira Salles, C.Ss.R. (since 2012.02.15)
  - Bishop Francesco Biasin (2003.07.23 – 2011.06.08), appointed Bishop of Barra do Piraí–Volta Redonda)
  - Bishop Bernardino Marchió (1993.05.26 – 2002.11.06), appointed Bishop of Caruaru, Pernambuco
  - Bishop Manuel Palmeira da Rocha (1980.03.14 – 1993.05.26)
  - Bishop Severino Mariano de Aguiar (1956.12.03 – 1980.03.14)
  - Bishop Adelmo Cavalcante Machado (1948.04.03 – 1955.06.24), appointed Coadjutor Archbishop of Maceió, Alagoas
  - Bishop Adalberto Accioli Sobral (1934.01.13 – 1947.01.18), appointed Archbishop of São Luís do Maranhão
  - Bishop José Antônio de Oliveira Lopes (1918.08.02 – 1932.11.24)
- Bishops of Floresta (Roman Rite), below
  - Bishop José Antônio de Oliveira Lopes (1915.06.26 – 1918.08.02)
  - Bishop Augusto Álvaro da Silva (1911.05.12 – 1915.06.25), appointed Bishop of Barra (do Rio Grande), Bahia; future Archbishop and Cardinal

=== Coadjutor bishop ===
- Bernardino Marchió (1991-1993)

== See also ==
- Cimbres Marian apparition, which happened in the diocese in 1936 and 1937.
