= Belo Jardim Airport =

Belo Jardim–Olegário Franklin Cordeiro Airport Aeroporto de Belo Jardim–Olegário Franklin Cordeiro
- IATA: none; ICAO: SNBJ

Summary
- Airport type: Public
- Serves: Belo Jardim
- Closed: 2020 (temporarily)
- Time zone: BRT (UTC−03:00)
- Elevation AMSL: 640 m (2,100 ft)
- Coordinates: 08°20′42″S 36°26′28″W

Map
- Location in Brazil

Runways
Direction	Length		Surface
Direction	m	ft	Surface
10/28	935	3,068	Asphalt
- Sources: ANAC

Belo Jardim–Olegário Franklin Cordeiro Airport (ICAO: SNBJ) is the airport serving Belo Jardim, Brazil. It was closed in 2020.

== History ==
On March 24, 2020 the operational license of the facility was revoked. However, in May 2025, the facility was undergoing a process of re-certification.

== Access ==
The airport is located 3 km (2 mi) from downtown Belo Jardim.

== See also ==
- List of airports in Brazil
