= Paratió language =

Extinct language of Brazil

Paratió
- Prakió
- Native to: Brazil
- Region: Capibaribe River, Pernambuco
- Ethnicity: 2,263 Kapinawá (= Paratió) (2020)
- Extinct: after 1964
- Language family: Xukuruan: Paratió

Language codes
- ISO 639-3: xpn Kapinawá
- Glottolog: para1322 Paratio kapi1248 Kapinawá
- Map of Buíque, Permambuco, where the Kapinawá live

Paratió (also called Praki-ô, Prakió, and Paraquió) is an extinct and poorly attested language of northeastern Brazil, known only through two wordlists published in 1958. It appears to have been related to Xukuru, and may have been a dialect, according to Glottolog. However, there is very little evidence to determine this relationship. The modern-day Paratió, originally settled in the aldeia of Macaco, now call themselves Kapinawá.

== Geographical distribution ==
It was originally spoken along the Capibaribe River, and was reported by Loukotka (1968) to have been spoken by a few individuals in Cimbres as of 1964.

== History ==
As of the 1900s, the Xukuru population still had some recollection of the Paratió population, however the Paratió's geographical location suggests that they could be ancestors of the Kapinawá.

== Vocabulary ==
=== Pompeu Sobrinho (1958) ===
These word lists of language varieties from the Serra do Urubá (also known as the Serra do Arorobá or Serra do Ororubá, located in the municipality of Pesqueira, Pernambuco) are reproduced from Pompeu Sobrinho (1958). According to Loukotka (1968), the following wordlists represent Paratió.

Below are two vocabularies collected by Domingos Cruz, who was not trained professionally, in Pesqueira, Pernambuco, from his informants Rodrigues de Mendonça, who was originally from the Serra do Urubá, and Pedro Rodrigues, who was originally from the abandoned sitio of Gitó (Jitó) in the Serra do Urubá.

Portuguese gloss	English gloss	Paratió (Rodrigues de Mendonça)	Paratió (Pedro Rodrigues)
aldeiamento	village		taiopo maritáro
arco (arma)	bow (weapon)		tamaingú, temaigú
cabeça	head	kreká, kri/ká	
cabeça de vaca	cow head	kreká memêngo	
cabra	goat		krexkuák jãtarinta
carne	meat		inxi, ixi; inxin
chapéu	hat	kriákugo, kriá	
chuva	rain	kraxixi	
comedor de carne	meat eater		inzin aragogú
comida	food	kringó	
comida boa	good food	kringó konengo	
cachaça	cachaça (sugarcane liquor)	irínka	orinka 'aguardente'
bom, boa	good	konengo	
chefe, mais velho	chief, older	taióp	
Deus	God	tupá	tupá
faca grande	big knife	xaníko	
faca pequena	small knife	saquarék	
fome	hunger		xurák
homem	man	xiakrók	
homem branco	white man	karé	
homem índio	Indigenous man	xenunpe	
homem defeituoso	deformed man	jajú	
fome	hunger	xurák	
inimigo	enemy	aredirí	
ir embora	go away	nuntógo	
marinheiro (estrangeiro)	sailor (foreigner)		karé irut
mentiroso	liar		jupegúgo
mulher	woman	krippó	
milho	corn	xigó	
negra	black woman		taká jipu
negro (homem)	black man		taká
nevoeiro	fog	batukin	
Nossa Senhora	Virgin Mary		Tamaipí
onça	jaguar		jetôme
lua	moon	limolago	limolágo
sol	sun	oraci	orací
pedra	stone	krá	
pedra (em cima da terra)	stone (on top of the earth)	krá xixí	
pé	foot	poiá	
defeito	defect	guxú	
pé defeituoso	defective foot	poiá guxú	
raça, tribo	race, tribe		xekurú
ruim	bad	aguá, pigó	
homem branco ruim	bad white man	karé aguá	
homem branco bom	good white man	karé konengo	
O inimigo vem aí.	The enemy is coming.	arediri arediri	
