= Pesqueira, Pernambuco =

Municipality of Pernambuco, Brazil

Pesqueira Cimbres
- Municipality
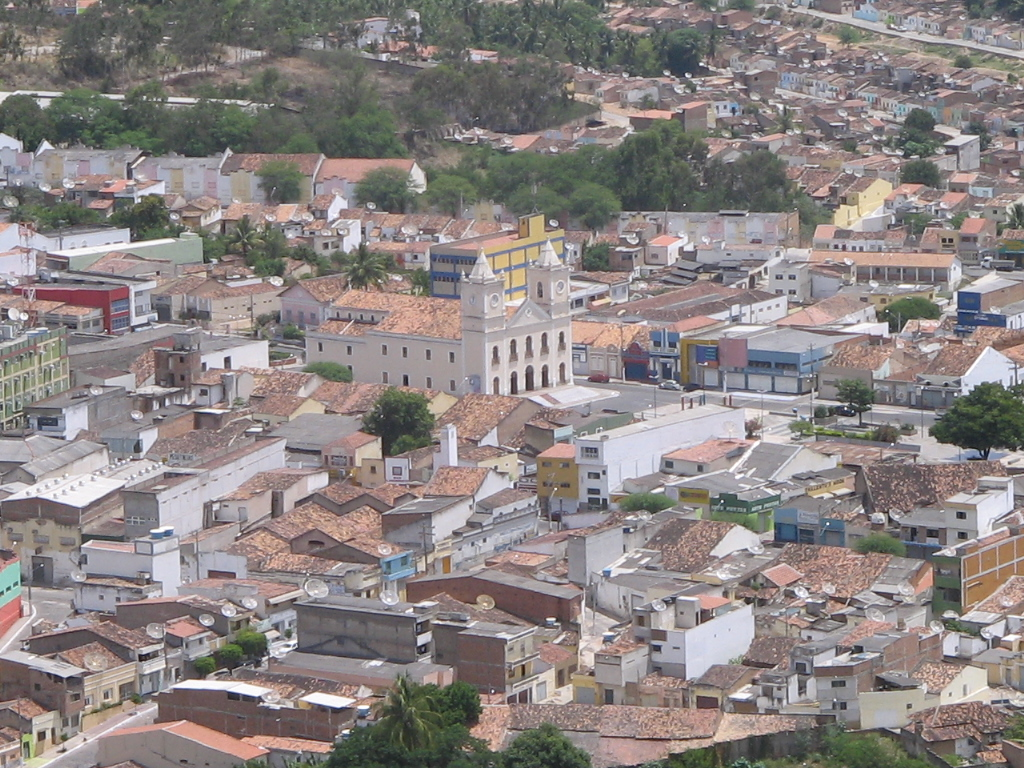
- Pesqueira Overview

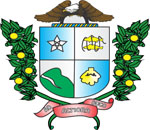
- Flag Coat of arms

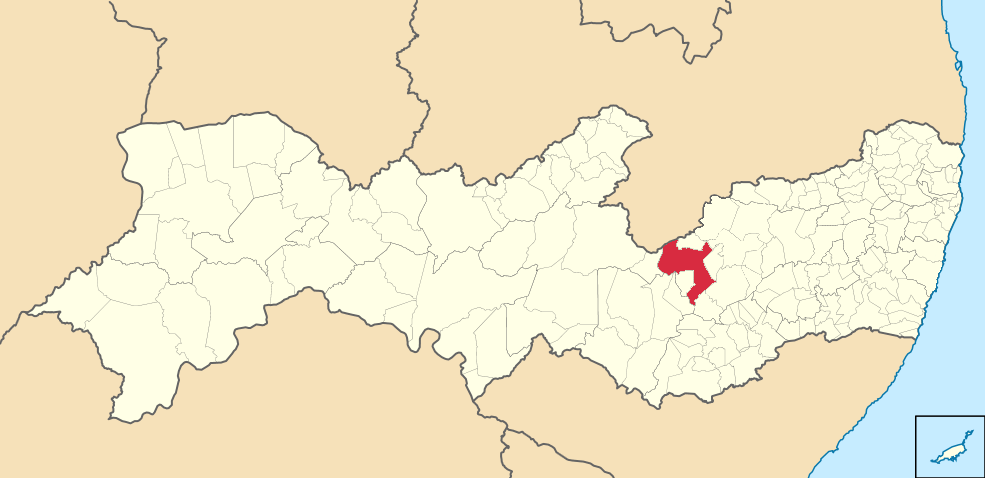
- Location in Brazil

- Location within Brazil
- Coordinates: 08°21′42″S 36°41′41″W
- Country: Brazil
- Region: Northeast
- State: Pernambuco
- Settled: 1660s
- Founded: May 13th, 1836
- Incorporated: April 20th, 1880

Government
  - Mayor: Evandro Mauro Maciel Chacon

Area
  - Total: 980.876 km^{2} (378.718 sq mi)
- Elevation: 654.0 m (2,145.7 ft)

Population (2022 Census)
  - Total: 62,722
  - Estimate (2025): 65,481
  - Density: 91.96/km^{2} (238.2/sq mi)
- Time zone: UTC−3 (BRT)
- HDI (2000): 0.610

Pesqueira (Central northeastern portuguese pronunciation: [pesˈkeɾɐ]) (formerly known as Cimbres) is a Brazilian municipality in the state of Pernambuco. It had an estimated population in 2020 according to the IBGE, of 67,735. Its area is 980.876 km^{2}.

== History ==
The municipality was created in 1762 under the name Cimbres. In 1836, the seat of the local authority was transferred from the town of Cimbres to that of Poço de Pesqueira. In 1880 the village was renamed with the saint's name Águeda de Pesqueira. In 1913 the whole municipality started to be called Pesqueira, instead of Cimbres. In 1918, the city was made the seat of the Roman Catholic Diocese of Pesqueira.

=== Marian apparition ===
The district of Cimbres, old seat of the municipality, was the site of the Cimbres Marian apparition, in 1936 and 1937.

== Languages ==
The Xukuruan languages were spoken in the Serra do Urubá (also known as the Serra do Arorobá or Serra do Ororubá) of Pesqueira municipality. The extinct Paratió language, related to Xukuru, originally spoken on the Capibaribe River, was reported by Loukotka (1968) to have been spoken by a few individuals in Cimbres.

== Geography ==
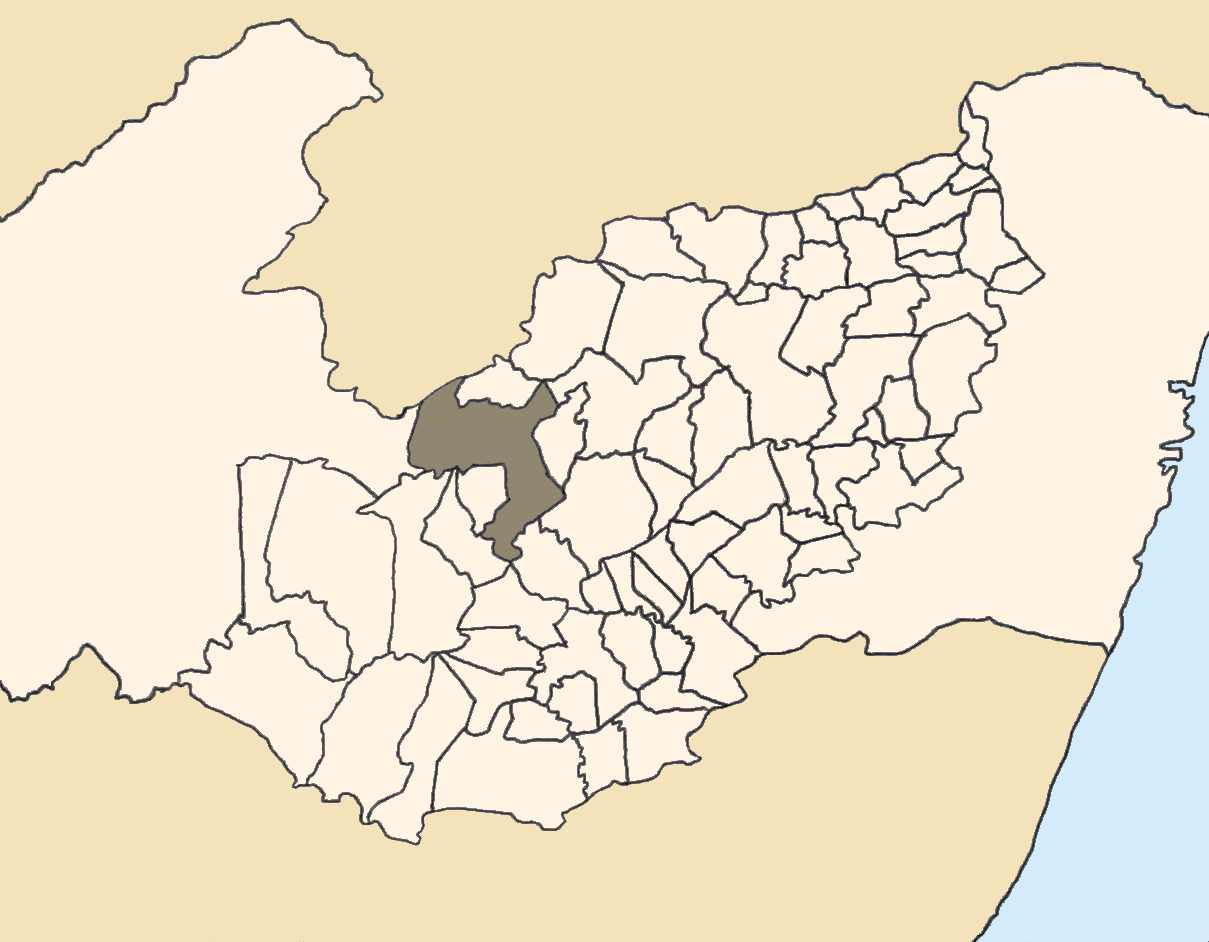
Location of Pesqueira within Pernambuco.

- State - Pernambuco
- Region - Agreste Pernambucano
- Boundaries - Paraíba and Poção (N); Venturosa and Alagoinha (S); Arcoverde and Pedra (W); Belo Jardim, São Bento do Una, Capoeiras and Sanharó (E)
- Area - 1000.2 km^{2}
- Elevation - 654 m
- Hydrography - Ipanema, Ipojuca and Una rivers
- Vegetation - Caatinga Hipoxerófila.
- Climate - Semi desertic, hot and dry
- Annual average temperature - 22.4 c
- Main road - BR 232
- Distance to Recife - 214 km

== Economy ==
The main economic activities in Pesqueira are based in general commerce, services and primary sector.

=== Economic Indicators ===
Population	GDP x(1000 R$).	GDP pc (R$)	PE
64.454	236.259	3.852	0.39%

Economy by Sector 2006

Primary sector	Secondary sector	Service sector
12.06%	10.99%	76.95%

=== Health Indicators ===
HDI (2000)	Hospitals (2007)	Hospitals beds (2007)	Children's Mortality every 1000 (2005)
0.636	2	179	17.4

== Climate ==
Climate data for Pesqueira, Pernambuco (1981–2010)
Month	Jan	Feb	Mar	Apr	May	Jun	Jul	Aug	Sep	Oct	Nov	Dec	Year
Mean daily maximum °C (°F)	31.4 (88.5)	31.0 (87.8)	30.9 (87.6)	29.5 (85.1)	28.2 (82.8)	26.5 (79.7)	25.8 (78.4)	26.7 (80.1)	28.5 (83.3)	30.4 (86.7)	31.2 (88.2)	31.4 (88.5)	29.3 (84.7)
Daily mean °C (°F)	24.1 (75.4)	24.2 (75.6)	24.1 (75.4)	23.5 (74.3)	22.6 (72.7)	21.2 (70.2)	20.6 (69.1)	20.8 (69.4)	21.8 (71.2)	23.2 (73.8)	23.8 (74.8)	24.1 (75.4)	22.8 (73.0)
Mean daily minimum °C (°F)	19.8 (67.6)	19.8 (67.6)	19.9 (67.8)	19.8 (67.6)	18.9 (66.0)	17.9 (64.2)	17.2 (63.0)	16.9 (62.4)	17.6 (63.7)	18.4 (65.1)	19.2 (66.6)	19.5 (67.1)	18.7 (65.7)
Average precipitation mm (inches)	21.7 (0.85)	75.8 (2.98)	98.1 (3.86)	100.2 (3.94)	83.8 (3.30)	59.7 (2.35)	53.8 (2.12)	27.3 (1.07)	10.8 (0.43)	14.3 (0.56)	19.3 (0.76)	26.2 (1.03)	591.0 (23.27)
Average precipitation days (≥ 1.0 mm)	2	5	7	8	8	9	9	6	2	2	2	2	62
Average relative humidity (%)	70.6	71.8	73.2	77.9	80.2	81.6	81.6	77.2	74.0	70.4	69.3	69.8	74.8
Mean monthly sunshine hours	221.6	169.1	218.5	195.3	169.6	131.3	149.8	174.1	224.1	258.0	232.1	233.2	2,376.7
Source: Instituto Nacional de Meteorologia

== See also ==
- List of municipalities in Pernambuco
