= Tarairiú language =

Extinct language of eastern Brazil

Tarairiú
- Ochucuyana
- Otxukayana
- Native to: Brazil
- Region: Rio Grande do Norte, Paraíba, Ceará, Piauí, Alagoas, Pernambuco
- Ethnicity: Tarairiú people
- Extinct: (date missing)
- Revival: In recovery in the Tapuya Tarairiú Village of Lagoa do Tapará in the municipality of São Gonçalo do Amarante (Rio Grande do Norte)
- Language family: unclassified

Language codes
- ISO 639-3: None (mis)
- Glottolog: tara1303
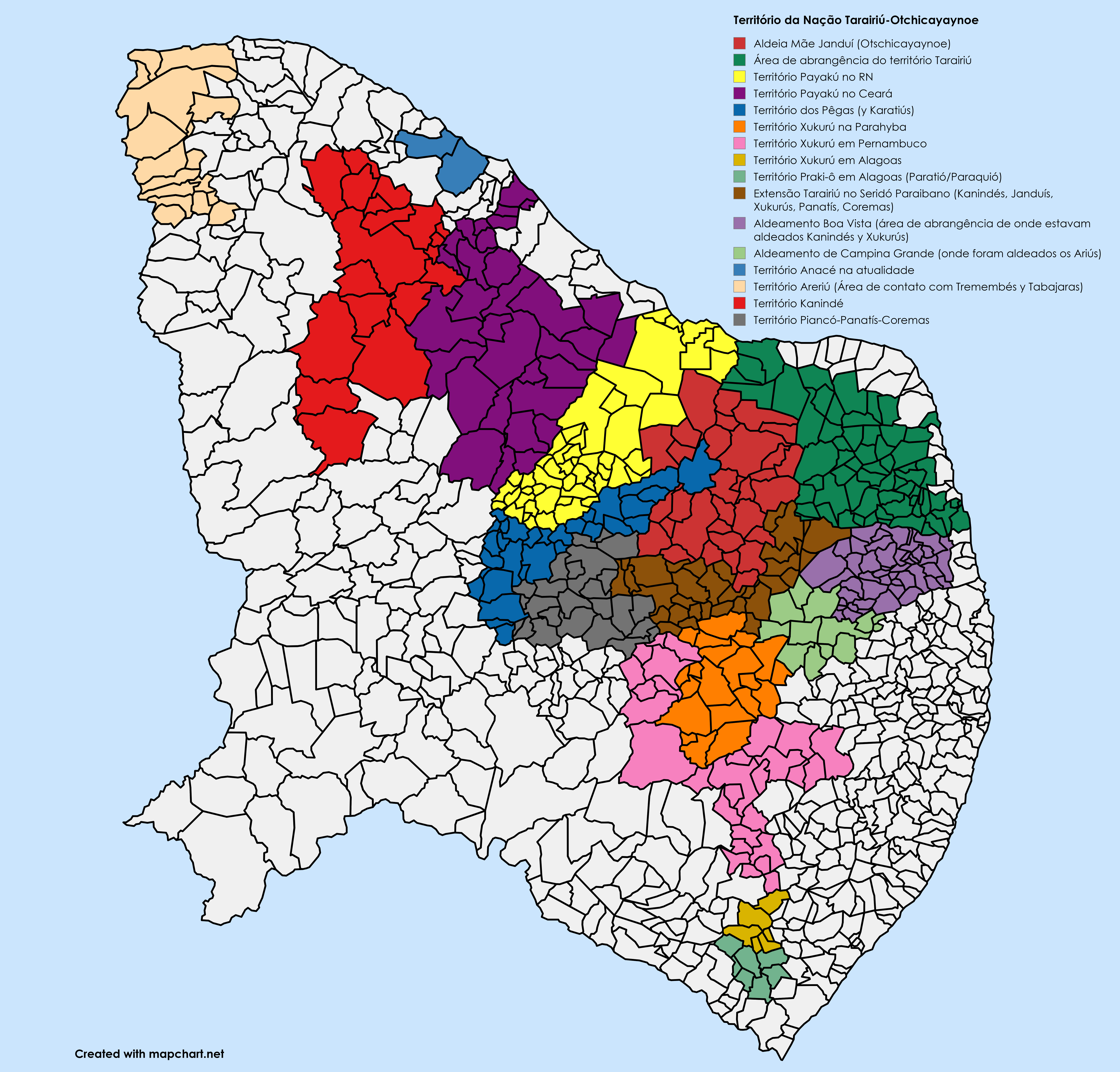
- Geographical extent of the Tarariú

Tarairiú is an extinct language of eastern Brazil. The Tarairiú Nation was divided into several etnies: the Janduí, Kanindé, Payakú (Pajoke, Pajacú, Bajacú), Jenipapo, Jenipapo-Kanindé, Javó, Kamaçu, Takarijú, Ariús, Pêgas, Caratiús, Coremas, Panatís, Paratiós, Piancós, Xukurú among others.

It was once spoken between the Assú River and Apodi River in Rio Grande do Norte.

== Classification ==
The language is attested only through a few word lists. Kaufman (1994) reports that "not even Gr[eenberg] dares classify this language".
