= Belo Jardim =

Municipality of Pernambuco, Brazil

- Municipality
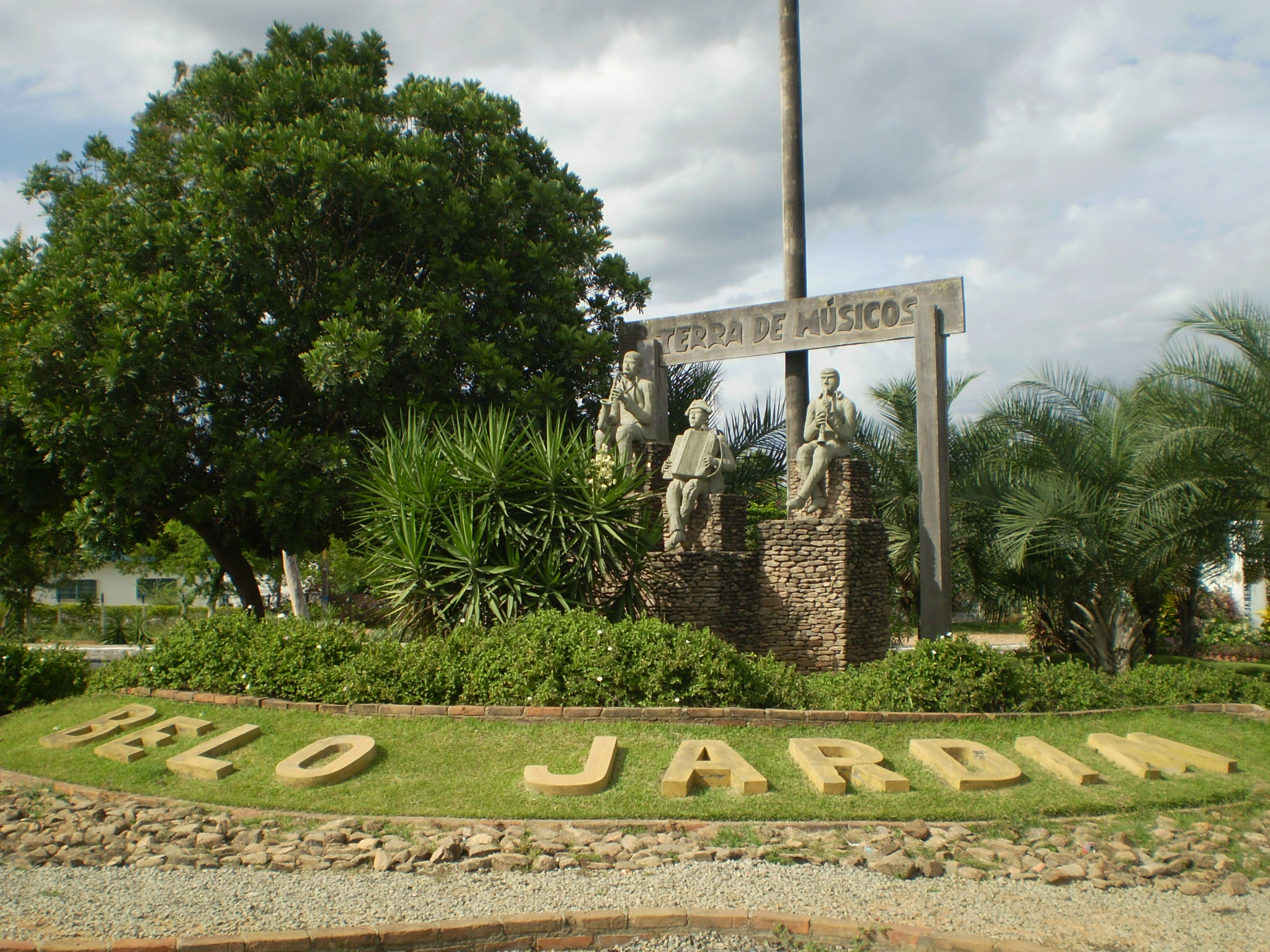
- Musician's monument at the city entrance

- Flag Coat of arms

- Belo Jardim in the state of Pernambuco

- Location within Brazil Location within South America
- Coordinates: 8.33583°S 36.42388°W
- Country: Brazil
- Region: Northeast
- State: Pernambuco

Area
  - Total: 647.7 km^{2} (250.1 sq mi)
- Elevation: 608 m (1,995 ft)

Population (2022 Census)
  - Total: 79,507
  - Estimate (2025): 84,033
  - Density: 122.8/km^{2} (317.9/sq mi)
- Demonym: Belo-jardinense
- Time zone: UTC-3:00 (BRT)

Belo Jardim (Central northeastern portuguese pronunciation: [ˈbɛlu ʒɐhˈdĩ]) (Beautiful Garden) a Brazilian municipality in the state of Pernambuco. It has an estimated population in 2020 of 76,687 and a total area of 647.7 km^{2}. It is located at 608 meters above the sea level and 182 km away from the state capital, Recife.

The economy is based on agribusiness (poultry, guava-based products, other food), agriculture (beans, maize, sweet potatoes, banana, coffee, manioc, tomatoes, garlic, sugar cane), and automotive batteries. The city is the headquarters of Acumuladores Moura S.A. (Baterias Moura).

The city is served by Belo Jardim Airport.

== Geography ==
- State - Pernambuco
- Region - Agreste of Pernambuco
- Boundaries - Brejo da Madre de Deus and Jataúba (N); São Bento do Una and Sanharó (S); Pesqueira (W); Tacaimbó (E)
- Area - 647.7 km^{2}
- Elevation - 608 m
- Hydrography - Ipojuca River
- Vegetation - Subcaducifólia forest
- Climate - Semi-arid
- Annual average temperature - 22.5 c
- Main road - BR 232
- Distance to Recife - 182 km

== Economy ==
The economy is based on agribusiness, agriculture, commerce and automotive batteries. The city is the headquarters of Acumuladores Moura S.A. (Baterias Moura or Auto-batteries Moura).

=== Economic Indicators ===
Population	GDP x(1000 R$).	GDP pc (R$)	PE
74.028	504.735	7.113	0.85%

Economy by Sector 2006

Primary sector	Secondary sector	Service sector
3.35%	38.54%	58.11%

=== Health Indicators ===
HDI (2000)	Hospitals (2007)	Hospitals beds (2007)	Children's Mortality every 1000 (2005)
0.625	2	137	29.5

== See also ==
- List of municipalities in Pernambuco
