= Geraldo Lapenda =

Brazilian university professor (1925–2004)

- Born: Geraldo Calábria Lapenda; December 6, 1925; Nazaré da Mata
- Died: December 19, 2004 (aged 79); Recife
- Occupation: Linguist

Academic work
- Institutions: Federal University of Pernambuco
- Main interests: Indigenous languages of South America

Geraldo Calábria Lapenda (December 6, 1925, in Nazaré da Mata – December 19, 2004, in Recife) was a Brazilian philologist and university professor.

Lapenda is known for his extensive work on the indigenous languages of South America. He spent decades teaching at the Federal University of Pernambuco.

== Bibliography ==
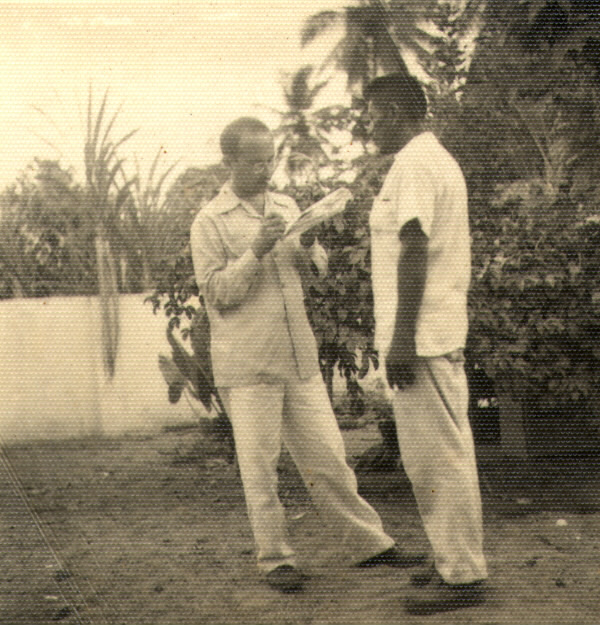
Geraldo Lapenda with Lourenço, a Fulnio Indian, in 1952

- História da Literatura Latina – apreciacione da obra del Cônego Pedrosa (1948)
- O Condicional no Sistema Verbal Latino (1952)
- Nomes Compostos da Língua Grega (1952)
- Português Comercial – apreciacione sobre o trabalho del Prof. Adauto Pontes (1952)
- Palestra e Ginásio (1953)
- Etimologia da Palavra "Tupã" (1953)
- Morfologia Histórica do Italiano (1954)
- O Indo-europeu (1954)
- Os Dialetos da Itália (1956)
- O Substantivo Italiano (1959)
- O Dialeto Xucuru (1962)
- Perfil da Língua Yathê (1965)
- Processos Morfológicos e Mudanças Fonéticas (1977)
- Meios de Produção e Transmissão dos Sons da Fala na Linguagem Humana (1980)
- Universidade é reunião de valores (1980)
- Maracutaias (1990)
- Quebra-cabeças (1990)
- Pseudo-etimologias (1990).

=== Poetry ===
- Por causa d'um colarinho (1942)
- Xe remirekó (1952)
- Ne te deiciant tribulationes (1955)
- HOMEMULHER (1978)
