= Sanharó =

Municipality of Pernambuco, Brazil

- Municipality of Pernambuco, Brazil
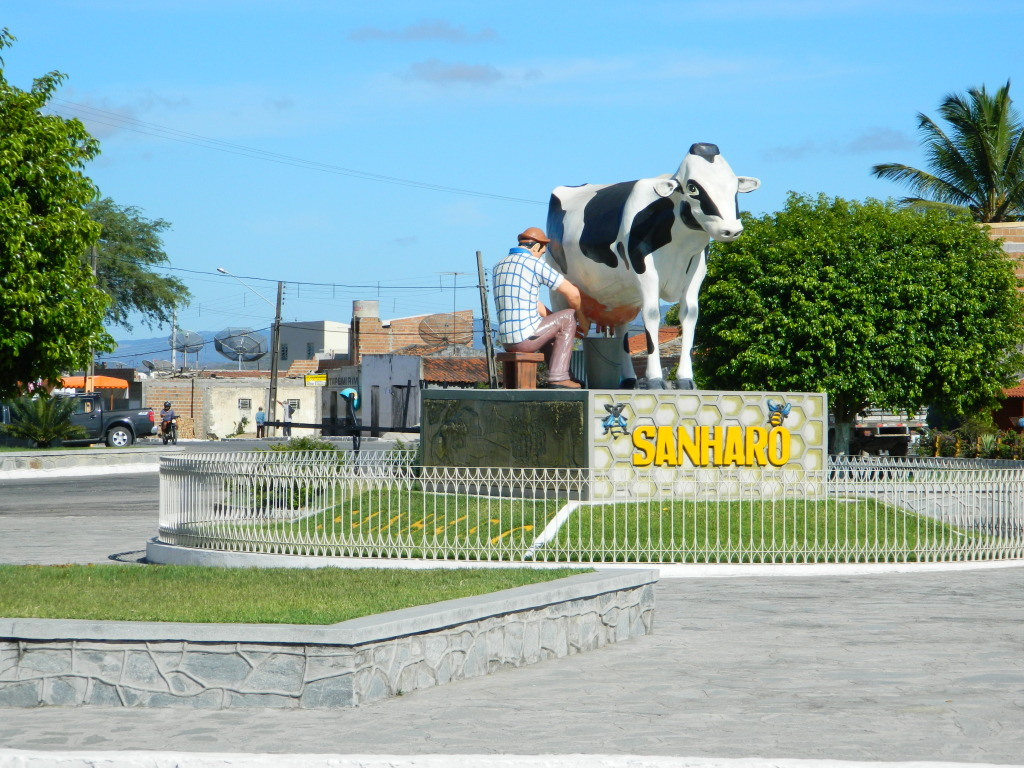
- Governor Miguel Arraes Plaza in Sanharó

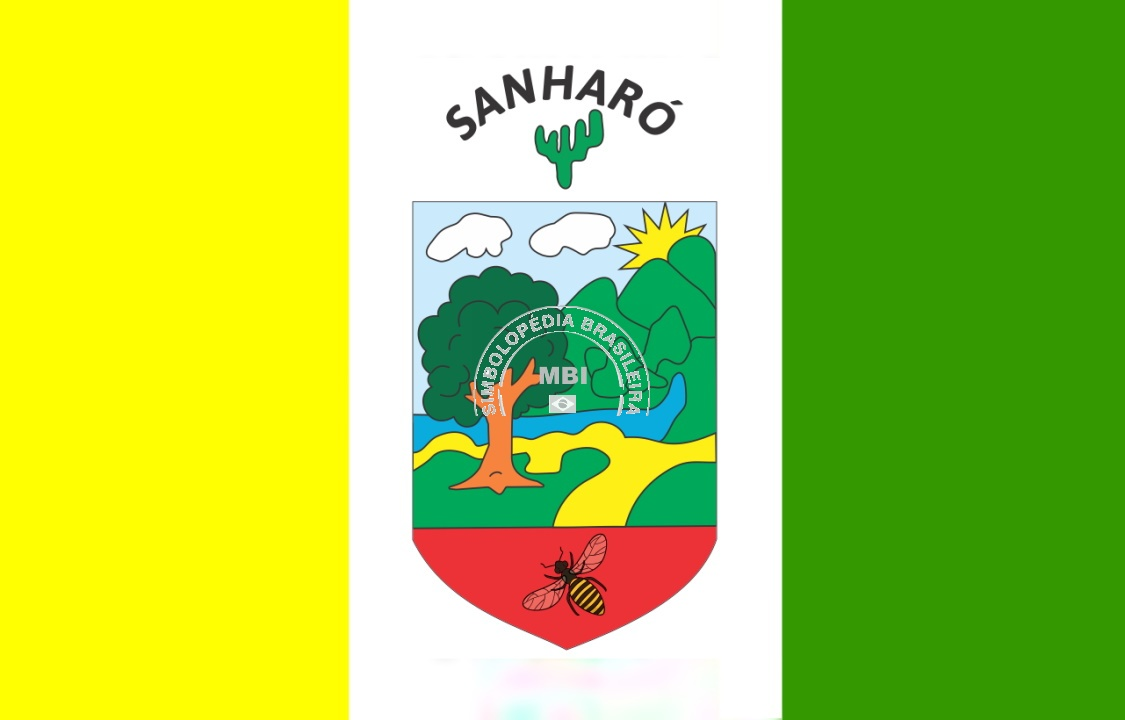
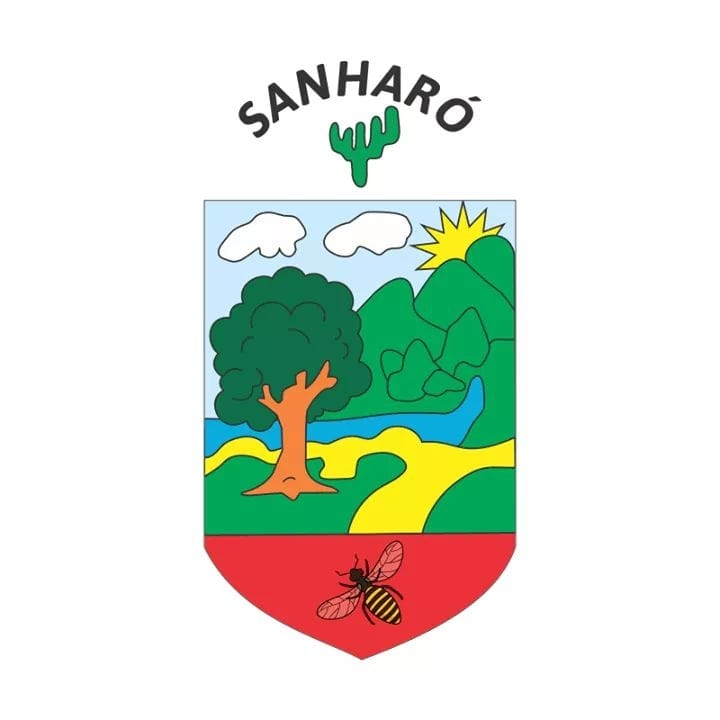
- Flag Coat of arms
- Etymology: Named after a bee species
- Location of Sanharó in Pernambuco

- Location within Brazil Location within South America
- Coordinates: 8°21′39″S 36°33′57″W
- Country: Brazil
- Region: Northeast
- State: Pernambuco
- Founded: 24 December 1948

Government
  - Mayor: César Augusto de Freitas (PCdoB) (2025-2028)
  - Vice Mayor: Rodrigo José Galvão Didier (PSB) (2025-2028)

Area
  - Total: 268.065 km^{2} (103.500 sq mi)
- Elevation: 653 m (2,142 ft)

Population (2022 Census)
  - Total: 18,624
  - Estimate (2025): 18,812
  - Density: 69.48/km^{2} (180.0/sq mi)
- Demonym: Sanharoense (Brazilian Portuguese)
- Time zone: UTC-03:00 (Brasília Time)
- Postal code: 55250-000, 55255-000, 55258-000
- HDI (2010): 0.603 – medium
- Website: sanharo.pe.gov.br

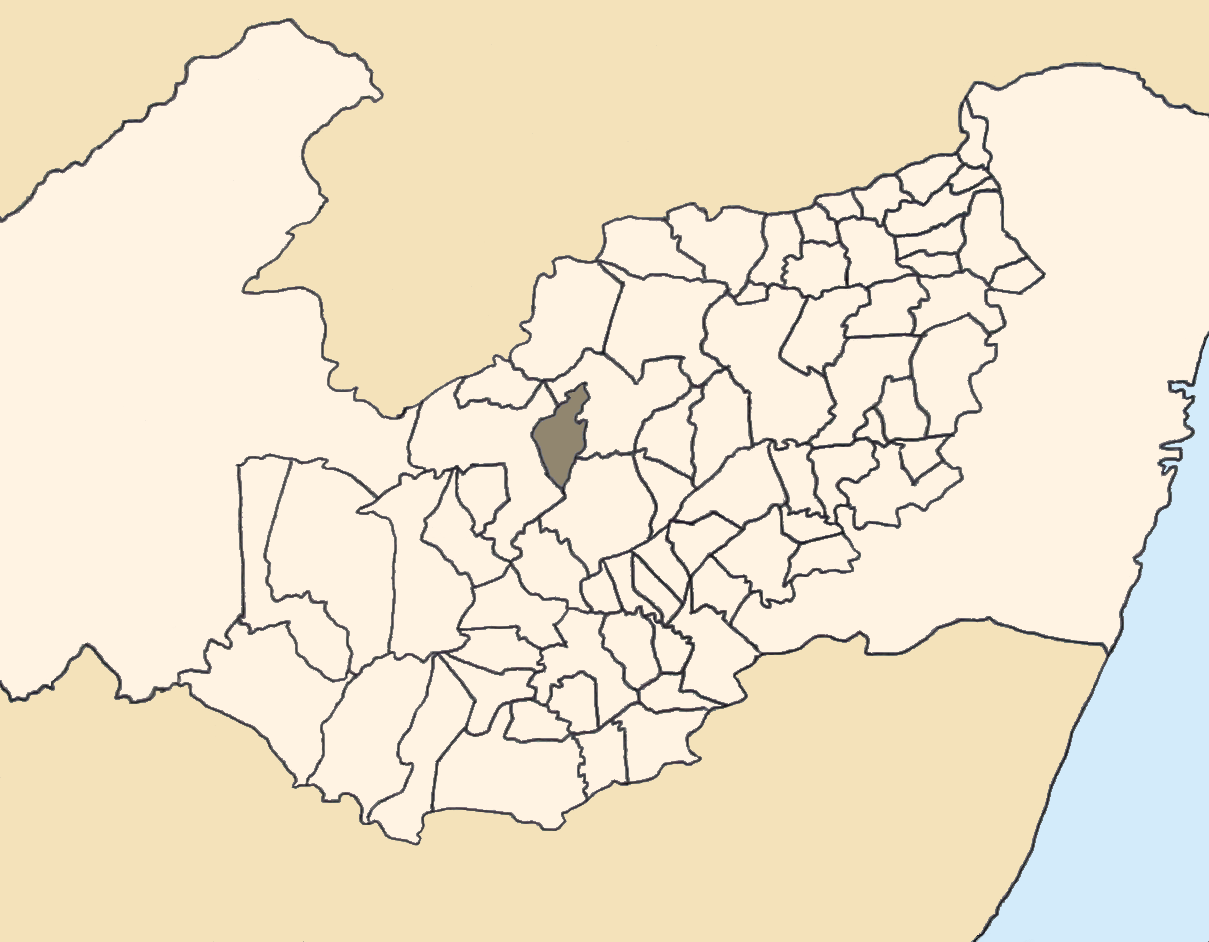
Location of Sanharó within Pernambuco.

Sanharó (Central northeastern portuguese pronunciation: [sɐ̃j̃ĩɐˈɾɔ]) is a city located in the state of Pernambuco, Brazil. Located at 198 km away from Recife, capital of the state of Pernambuco. Has an estimated (IBGE 2025) population of 18,812 inhabitants.

== Geography ==
- State - Pernambuco
- Region - Agreste Pernambucano
- Boundaries - Belo Jardim (N and E); São Bento do Una (S); Pesqueira (W)
- Area - 256.18 km^{2}
- Elevation - 653 m
- Hydrography - Capibaribe and Ipojuca rivers
- Vegetation - Caatinga Hipoxerófila
- Climate - Semi arid - hot
- Annual average temperature - 22.3 c
- Distance to Recife - 198 km

== Economy ==
The main economic activities in Sanharó are based in industry and agribusiness, especially manioc, beans; and livestock such as cattle, pigs, sheep, goats and poultry.

=== Economic indicators ===
Population	GDP x(1000 R$).	GDP pc (R$)	PE
18.723	63.113	3.580	0.10%

Economy by Sector 2006

Primary sector	Secondary sector	Service sector
19.11%	9.69%	71.20%

=== Health indicators ===
HDI (2000)	Hospitals (2007)	Hospitals beds (2007)	Children's Mortality every 1000 (2005)
0.618	1	25	34.2

== See also ==
- List of municipalities in Pernambuco
