= Xukuruan languages =

Proposed language family of Brazil

Xukuruan
- Shukuru
- Geographic distribution: Brazil
- Linguistic classification: One of the world's primary language families
- Subdivisions: Xukurú †; Paratió †; ?Garanhun †

Language codes
- Glottolog: xuku1239 Xukurú

The Xukuruan languages are a language family proposed by Czech linguist Čestmír Loukotka (1968) that links two languages of Alagoas state in Brazil, Xukuru and Paratió, both of them extinct. Glottolog treats them as dialects of a single Xukuru language.

== Classification ==
The languages are:

- Xukurú
- Paratió

Loukotka (1968) also lists the unattested Garañun (Garanhun), formerly distributed in the Serra dos Garanhuns, but this is rather the name of an Indigenous people of the mountain range mentioned by Carl Friedrich Philipp von Martius in his ethnographic description of 1863.

== Sources ==
- Moseley, C. (2008). Encyclopedia of the World's Endangered Languages. Taylor & Francis. ISBN 978-1-135-79640-2.
