= Xukuru people =

Indigenous people of Brazil

Xukuru
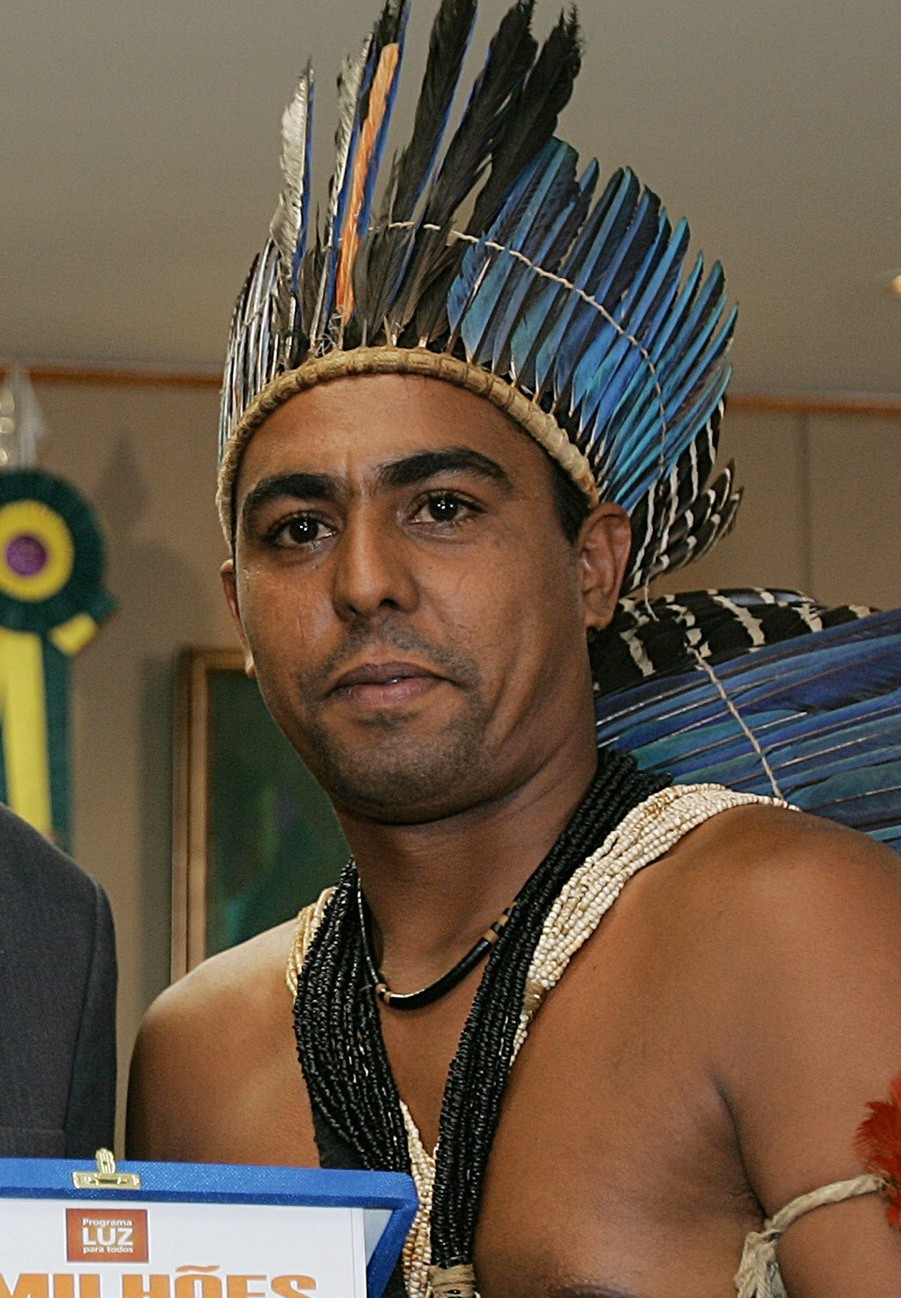

Total population
- 8,500

Regions with significant populations
- Brazil

Languages
- Portuguese, formerly Xukuru

The Xukuru (Xucuru) are an indigenous people of Brazil, with a population of approximately 8,500, living in the state of Pernambuco, Brazil.

== History ==
According to Thomaz Pompeu Sobrinho, the Xukuru are related to the Tarairiú people.

=== Land reclamation ===
They have recently gained governmental recognition of their rights to their indigenous homeland in the Ororubá Mountains, though this has brought them into conflict with the local settler population of the region. In 1998, a Xukuru leader, Chicão (Francisco Lacerda, also Cacique Xikão), was assassinated, apparently because of his opposition to the encroachment of ranchers in Xukuru territory. However his children carried on his legacy.

== Ethnography ==
An extensive ethnography has been written by William D. Hohenthal, Jr. (1954), who visited the Xukuru in 1951.
