= List of municipalities in Paraná =

Municipalities of Parana, Brazil

This is a list of the municipalities in the state of Paraná (PR), located in the South Region of Brazil. Paraná is divided into 399 municipalities, which are grouped into 39 microregions, which are grouped into 10 mesoregions.

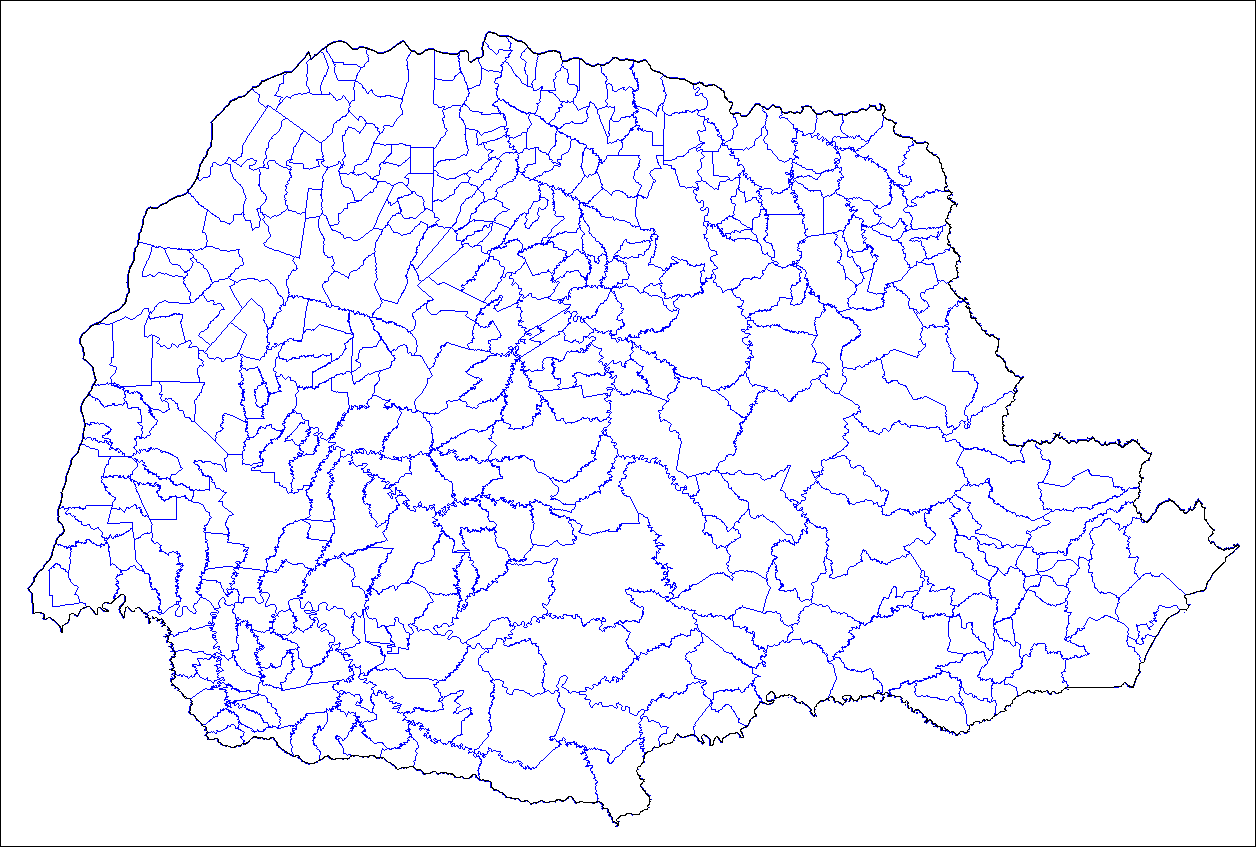
Municipalities of Paraná, Brazil

Mesoregion	Microregion	Municipality
Centro Ocidental Paranaense	Campo Mourão	Araruna
Centro Ocidental Paranaense	Campo Mourão	Barbosa Ferraz
Centro Ocidental Paranaense	Campo Mourão	Campo Mourão
Centro Ocidental Paranaense	Campo Mourão	Corumbataí do Sul
Centro Ocidental Paranaense	Campo Mourão	Engenheiro Beltrão
Centro Ocidental Paranaense	Campo Mourão	Farol
Centro Ocidental Paranaense	Campo Mourão	Fênix
Centro Ocidental Paranaense	Campo Mourão	Iretama
Centro Ocidental Paranaense	Campo Mourão	Luiziana
Centro Ocidental Paranaense	Campo Mourão	Mamborê
Centro Ocidental Paranaense	Campo Mourão	Peabiru
Centro Ocidental Paranaense	Campo Mourão	Quinta do Sol
Centro Ocidental Paranaense	Campo Mourão	Roncador
Centro Ocidental Paranaense	Campo Mourão	Terra Boa
Centro Ocidental Paranaense	Goioerê	Altamira do Paraná
Centro Ocidental Paranaense	Goioerê	Boa Esperança
Centro Ocidental Paranaense	Goioerê	Campina da Lagoa
Centro Ocidental Paranaense	Goioerê	Goioerê
Centro Ocidental Paranaense	Goioerê	Janiópolis
Centro Ocidental Paranaense	Goioerê	Juranda
Centro Ocidental Paranaense	Goioerê	Moreira Sales
Centro Ocidental Paranaense	Goioerê	Nova Cantu
Centro Ocidental Paranaense	Goioerê	Quarto Centenário
Centro Ocidental Paranaense	Goioerê	Rancho Alegre d'Oeste
Centro Ocidental Paranaense	Goioerê	Ubiratã
Centro Oriental Paranaense	Jaguariaíva	Arapoti
Centro Oriental Paranaense	Jaguariaíva	Jaguariaíva
Centro Oriental Paranaense	Jaguariaíva	Piraí do Sul
Centro Oriental Paranaense	Jaguariaíva	Sengés
Centro Oriental Paranaense	Ponta Grossa	Carambeí
Centro Oriental Paranaense	Ponta Grossa	Castro
Centro Oriental Paranaense	Ponta Grossa	Palmeira
Centro Oriental Paranaense	Ponta Grossa	Ponta Grossa
Centro Oriental Paranaense	Telêmaco Borba	Imbaú
Centro Oriental Paranaense	Telêmaco Borba	Ortigueira
Centro Oriental Paranaense	Telêmaco Borba	Reserva
Centro Oriental Paranaense	Telêmaco Borba	Telêmaco Borba
Centro Oriental Paranaense	Telêmaco Borba	Tibagi
Centro Oriental Paranaense	Telêmaco Borba	Ventania
Centro-Sul Paranaense	Guarapuava	Campina do Simão
Centro-Sul Paranaense	Guarapuava	Candói
Centro-Sul Paranaense	Guarapuava	Cantagalo
Centro-Sul Paranaense	Guarapuava	Espigão Alto do Iguaçu
Centro-Sul Paranaense	Guarapuava	Foz do Jordão
Centro-Sul Paranaense	Guarapuava	Goioxim
Centro-Sul Paranaense	Guarapuava	Guarapuava
Centro-Sul Paranaense	Guarapuava	Inácio Martins
Centro-Sul Paranaense	Guarapuava	Laranjeiras do Sul
Centro-Sul Paranaense	Guarapuava	Marquinho
Centro-Sul Paranaense	Guarapuava	Nova Laranjeiras
Centro-Sul Paranaense	Guarapuava	Pinhão
Centro-Sul Paranaense	Guarapuava	Porto Barreiro
Centro-Sul Paranaense	Guarapuava	Quedas do Iguaçu
Centro-Sul Paranaense	Guarapuava	Reserva do Iguaçu
Centro-Sul Paranaense	Guarapuava	Rio Bonito do Iguaçu
Centro-Sul Paranaense	Guarapuava	Turvo
Centro-Sul Paranaense	Guarapuava	Virmond
Centro-Sul Paranaense	Palmas	Clevelândia
Centro-Sul Paranaense	Palmas	Coronel Domingos Soares
Centro-Sul Paranaense	Palmas	Honório Serpa
Centro-Sul Paranaense	Palmas	Mangueirinha
Centro-Sul Paranaense	Palmas	Palmas
Centro-Sul Paranaense	Pitanga	Boa Ventura de São Roque
Centro-Sul Paranaense	Pitanga	Laranjal
Centro-Sul Paranaense	Pitanga	Mato Rico
Centro-Sul Paranaense	Pitanga	Palmital
Centro-Sul Paranaense	Pitanga	Pitanga
Centro-Sul Paranaense	Pitanga	Santa Maria do Oeste
Metropolitana de Curitiba	Cerro Azul	Adrianópolis
Metropolitana de Curitiba	Cerro Azul	Cerro Azul
Metropolitana de Curitiba	Cerro Azul	Doutor Ulysses
Metropolitana de Curitiba	Curitiba	Almirante Tamandaré
Metropolitana de Curitiba	Curitiba	Araucária
Metropolitana de Curitiba	Curitiba	Balsa Nova
Metropolitana de Curitiba	Curitiba	Bocaiuva do Sul
Metropolitana de Curitiba	Curitiba	Campina Grande do Sul
Metropolitana de Curitiba	Curitiba	Campo Largo
Metropolitana de Curitiba	Curitiba	Campo Magro
Metropolitana de Curitiba	Curitiba	Colombo
Metropolitana de Curitiba	Curitiba	Contenda
Metropolitana de Curitiba	Curitiba	Curitiba (State Capital)
Metropolitana de Curitiba	Curitiba	Fazenda Rio Grande
Metropolitana de Curitiba	Curitiba	Itaperuçu
Metropolitana de Curitiba	Curitiba	Mandirituba
Metropolitana de Curitiba	Curitiba	Pinhais
Metropolitana de Curitiba	Curitiba	Piraquara
Metropolitana de Curitiba	Curitiba	Quatro Barras
Metropolitana de Curitiba	Curitiba	Rio Branco do Sul
Metropolitana de Curitiba	Curitiba	São José dos Pinhais
Metropolitana de Curitiba	Curitiba	Tunas do Paraná
Metropolitana de Curitiba	Lapa	Lapa
Metropolitana de Curitiba	Lapa	Porto Amazonas
Metropolitana de Curitiba	Paranaguá	Antonina
Metropolitana de Curitiba	Paranaguá	Guaraqueçaba
Metropolitana de Curitiba	Paranaguá	Guaratuba
Metropolitana de Curitiba	Paranaguá	Matinhos
Metropolitana de Curitiba	Paranaguá	Morretes
Metropolitana de Curitiba	Paranaguá	Paranaguá
Metropolitana de Curitiba	Paranaguá	Pontal do Paraná
Metropolitana de Curitiba	Rio Negro	Agudos do Sul
Metropolitana de Curitiba	Rio Negro	Campo do Tenente
Metropolitana de Curitiba	Rio Negro	Pien
Metropolitana de Curitiba	Rio Negro	Quitandinha
Metropolitana de Curitiba	Rio Negro	Rio Negro
Metropolitana de Curitiba	Rio Negro	Tijucas do Sul
Noroeste Paranaense	Cianorte	Cianorte
Noroeste Paranaense	Cianorte	Cidade Gaúcha
Noroeste Paranaense	Cianorte	Guaporema
Noroeste Paranaense	Cianorte	Indianópolis
Noroeste Paranaense	Cianorte	Japurá
Noroeste Paranaense	Cianorte	Jussara
Noroeste Paranaense	Cianorte	Rondon
Noroeste Paranaense	Cianorte	São Manoel do Paraná
Noroeste Paranaense	Cianorte	São Tomé
Noroeste Paranaense	Cianorte	Tapejara
Noroeste Paranaense	Cianorte	Tuneiras do Oeste
Noroeste Paranaense	Paranavaí	Alto Paraná
Noroeste Paranaense	Paranavaí	Amaporã
Noroeste Paranaense	Paranavaí	Cruzeiro do Sul
Noroeste Paranaense	Paranavaí	Diamante do Norte
Noroeste Paranaense	Paranavaí	Guairaçá
Noroeste Paranaense	Paranavaí	Inajá
Noroeste Paranaense	Paranavaí	Itaúna do Sul
Noroeste Paranaense	Paranavaí	Jardim Olinda
Noroeste Paranaense	Paranavaí	Loanda
Noroeste Paranaense	Paranavaí	Marilena
Noroeste Paranaense	Paranavaí	Mirador
Noroeste Paranaense	Paranavaí	Nova Aliança do Ivaí
Noroeste Paranaense	Paranavaí	Nova Londrina
Noroeste Paranaense	Paranavaí	Paraíso do Norte
Noroeste Paranaense	Paranavaí	Paranacity
Noroeste Paranaense	Paranavaí	Paranapoema
Noroeste Paranaense	Paranavaí	Paranavaí
Noroeste Paranaense	Paranavaí	Planaltina do Paraná
Noroeste Paranaense	Paranavaí	Porto Rico
Noroeste Paranaense	Paranavaí	Querência do Norte
Noroeste Paranaense	Paranavaí	Santa Cruz de Monte Castelo
Noroeste Paranaense	Paranavaí	Santa Isabel do Ivaí
Noroeste Paranaense	Paranavaí	Santa Mônica
Noroeste Paranaense	Paranavaí	Santo Antônio do Caiuá
Noroeste Paranaense	Paranavaí	São Carlos do Ivaí
Noroeste Paranaense	Paranavaí	São João do Caiuá
Noroeste Paranaense	Paranavaí	São Pedro do Paraná
Noroeste Paranaense	Paranavaí	Tamboara
Noroeste Paranaense	Paranavaí	Terra Rica
Noroeste Paranaense	Umuarama	Alto Paraíso
Noroeste Paranaense	Umuarama	Alto Piquiri
Noroeste Paranaense	Umuarama	Altônia
Noroeste Paranaense	Umuarama	Brasilândia do Sul
Noroeste Paranaense	Umuarama	Cafezal do Sul
Noroeste Paranaense	Umuarama	Cruzeiro do Oeste
Noroeste Paranaense	Umuarama	Douradina
Noroeste Paranaense	Umuarama	Esperança Nova
Noroeste Paranaense	Umuarama	Francisco Alves
Noroeste Paranaense	Umuarama	Icaraíma
Noroeste Paranaense	Umuarama	Iporã
Noroeste Paranaense	Umuarama	Ivaté
Noroeste Paranaense	Umuarama	Maria Helena
Noroeste Paranaense	Umuarama	Mariluz
Noroeste Paranaense	Umuarama	Nova Olímpia
Noroeste Paranaense	Umuarama	Perobal
Noroeste Paranaense	Umuarama	Pérola
Noroeste Paranaense	Umuarama	São Jorge do Patrocínio
Noroeste Paranaense	Umuarama	Tapira
Noroeste Paranaense	Umuarama	Umuarama
Noroeste Paranaense	Umuarama	Xambrê
Norte Central Paranaense	Apucarana	Apucarana
Norte Central Paranaense	Apucarana	Arapongas
Norte Central Paranaense	Apucarana	Califórnia
Norte Central Paranaense	Apucarana	Cambira
Norte Central Paranaense	Apucarana	Jandaia do Sul
Norte Central Paranaense	Apucarana	Marilândia do Sul
Norte Central Paranaense	Apucarana	Mauá da Serra
Norte Central Paranaense	Apucarana	Novo Itacolomi
Norte Central Paranaense	Apucarana	Sabáudia
Norte Central Paranaense	Astorga	Ângulo
Norte Central Paranaense	Astorga	Astorga
Norte Central Paranaense	Astorga	Atalaia
Norte Central Paranaense	Astorga	Cafeara
Norte Central Paranaense	Astorga	Centenário do Sul
Norte Central Paranaense	Astorga	Colorado
Norte Central Paranaense	Astorga	Flórida
Norte Central Paranaense	Astorga	Guaraci
Norte Central Paranaense	Astorga	Iguaraçu
Norte Central Paranaense	Astorga	Itaguajé
Norte Central Paranaense	Astorga	Jaguapitã
Norte Central Paranaense	Astorga	Lobato
Norte Central Paranaense	Astorga	Lupionópolis
Norte Central Paranaense	Astorga	Mandaguaçu
Norte Central Paranaense	Astorga	Munhoz de Melo
Norte Central Paranaense	Astorga	Nossa Senhora das Graças
Norte Central Paranaense	Astorga	Nova Esperança
Norte Central Paranaense	Astorga	Presidente Castelo Branco
Norte Central Paranaense	Astorga	Santa Fé
Norte Central Paranaense	Astorga	Santa Inês
Norte Central Paranaense	Astorga	Santo Inácio
Norte Central Paranaense	Astorga	Uniflor
Norte Central Paranaense	Faxinal	Bom Sucesso
Norte Central Paranaense	Faxinal	Borrazópolis
Norte Central Paranaense	Faxinal	Cruzmaltina
Norte Central Paranaense	Faxinal	Faxinal
Norte Central Paranaense	Faxinal	Kaloré
Norte Central Paranaense	Faxinal	Marumbi
Norte Central Paranaense	Faxinal	Rio Bom
Norte Central Paranaense	Floraí	Doutor Camargo
Norte Central Paranaense	Floraí	Floraí
Norte Central Paranaense	Floraí	Floresta
Norte Central Paranaense	Floraí	Itambé
Norte Central Paranaense	Floraí	Ivatuba
Norte Central Paranaense	Floraí	Ourizona
Norte Central Paranaense	Floraí	São Jorge do Ivaí
Norte Central Paranaense	Ivaiporã	Arapuã
Norte Central Paranaense	Ivaiporã	Ariranha do Ivaí
Norte Central Paranaense	Ivaiporã	Cândido de Abreu
Norte Central Paranaense	Ivaiporã	Godoy Moreira
Norte Central Paranaense	Ivaiporã	Grandes Rios
Norte Central Paranaense	Ivaiporã	Ivaiporã
Norte Central Paranaense	Ivaiporã	Jardim Alegre
Norte Central Paranaense	Ivaiporã	Lidianópolis
Norte Central Paranaense	Ivaiporã	Lunardelli
Norte Central Paranaense	Ivaiporã	Manoel Ribas
Norte Central Paranaense	Ivaiporã	Nova Tebas
Norte Central Paranaense	Ivaiporã	Rio Branco do Ivaí
Norte Central Paranaense	Ivaiporã	Rosário do Ivaí
Norte Central Paranaense	Ivaiporã	São João do Ivaí
Norte Central Paranaense	Ivaiporã	São Pedro do Ivaí
Norte Central Paranaense	Londrina	Cambé
Norte Central Paranaense	Londrina	Ibiporã
Norte Central Paranaense	Londrina	Londrina
Norte Central Paranaense	Londrina	Pitangueiras
Norte Central Paranaense	Londrina	Rolândia
Norte Central Paranaense	Londrina	Tamarana
Norte Central Paranaense	Maringá	Mandaguari
Norte Central Paranaense	Maringá	Marialva
Norte Central Paranaense	Maringá	Maringá
Norte Central Paranaense	Maringá	Paiçandu
Norte Central Paranaense	Maringá	Sarandi
Norte Central Paranaense	Porecatu	Alvorada do Sul
Norte Central Paranaense	Porecatu	Bela Vista do Paraíso
Norte Central Paranaense	Porecatu	Florestópolis
Norte Central Paranaense	Porecatu	Miraselva
Norte Central Paranaense	Porecatu	Porecatu
Norte Central Paranaense	Porecatu	Prado Ferreira
Norte Central Paranaense	Porecatu	Primeiro de Maio
Norte Central Paranaense	Porecatu	Sertanópolis
Norte Pioneiro Paranaense	Assaí	Assaí
Norte Pioneiro Paranaense	Assaí	Jataizinho
Norte Pioneiro Paranaense	Assaí	Nova Santa Bárbara
Norte Pioneiro Paranaense	Assaí	Rancho Alegre
Norte Pioneiro Paranaense	Assaí	Santa Cecília do Pavão
Norte Pioneiro Paranaense	Assaí	São Jerônimo da Serra
Norte Pioneiro Paranaense	Assaí	São Sebastião da Amoreira
Norte Pioneiro Paranaense	Assaí	Uraí
Norte Pioneiro Paranaense	Cornélio Procópio	Abatiá
Norte Pioneiro Paranaense	Cornélio Procópio	Andirá
Norte Pioneiro Paranaense	Cornélio Procópio	Bandeirantes
Norte Pioneiro Paranaense	Cornélio Procópio	Congonhinhas
Norte Pioneiro Paranaense	Cornélio Procópio	Cornélio Procópio
Norte Pioneiro Paranaense	Cornélio Procópio	Itambaracá
Norte Pioneiro Paranaense	Cornélio Procópio	Leópolis
Norte Pioneiro Paranaense	Cornélio Procópio	Nova América da Colina
Norte Pioneiro Paranaense	Cornélio Procópio	Nova Fátima
Norte Pioneiro Paranaense	Cornélio Procópio	Ribeirão do Pinhal
Norte Pioneiro Paranaense	Cornélio Procópio	Santa Amélia
Norte Pioneiro Paranaense	Cornélio Procópio	Santa Mariana
Norte Pioneiro Paranaense	Cornélio Procópio	Santo Antônio do Paraíso
Norte Pioneiro Paranaense	Cornélio Procópio	Sertaneja
Norte Pioneiro Paranaense	Ibaiti	Conselheiro Mairinck
Norte Pioneiro Paranaense	Ibaiti	Curiúva
Norte Pioneiro Paranaense	Ibaiti	Figueira
Norte Pioneiro Paranaense	Ibaiti	Ibaiti
Norte Pioneiro Paranaense	Ibaiti	Jaboti
Norte Pioneiro Paranaense	Ibaiti	Japira
Norte Pioneiro Paranaense	Ibaiti	Pinhalão
Norte Pioneiro Paranaense	Ibaiti	Sapopema
Norte Pioneiro Paranaense	Jacarezinho	Barra do Jacaré
Norte Pioneiro Paranaense	Jacarezinho	Cambará
Norte Pioneiro Paranaense	Jacarezinho	Jacarezinho
Norte Pioneiro Paranaense	Jacarezinho	Jundiaí do Sul
Norte Pioneiro Paranaense	Jacarezinho	Ribeirão Claro
Norte Pioneiro Paranaense	Jacarezinho	Santo Antônio da Platina
Norte Pioneiro Paranaense	Wenceslau Braz	Carlópolis
Norte Pioneiro Paranaense	Wenceslau Braz	Guapirama
Norte Pioneiro Paranaense	Wenceslau Braz	Joaquim Távora
Norte Pioneiro Paranaense	Wenceslau Braz	Quatiguá
Norte Pioneiro Paranaense	Wenceslau Braz	Salto do Itararé
Norte Pioneiro Paranaense	Wenceslau Braz	Santana do Itararé
Norte Pioneiro Paranaense	Wenceslau Braz	São José da Boa Vista
Norte Pioneiro Paranaense	Wenceslau Braz	Siqueira Campos
Norte Pioneiro Paranaense	Wenceslau Braz	Tomazina
Norte Pioneiro Paranaense	Wenceslau Braz	Wenceslau Braz
Oeste Paranaense	Cascavel	Anahy
Oeste Paranaense	Cascavel	Boa Vista da Aparecida
Oeste Paranaense	Cascavel	Braganey
Oeste Paranaense	Cascavel	Cafelândia
Oeste Paranaense	Cascavel	Campo Bonito
Oeste Paranaense	Cascavel	Capitão Leônidas Marques
Oeste Paranaense	Cascavel	Cascavel
Oeste Paranaense	Cascavel	Catanduvas
Oeste Paranaense	Cascavel	Corbélia
Oeste Paranaense	Cascavel	Diamante do Sul
Oeste Paranaense	Cascavel	Guaraniaçu
Oeste Paranaense	Cascavel	Ibema
Oeste Paranaense	Cascavel	Iguatu
Oeste Paranaense	Cascavel	Lindoeste
Oeste Paranaense	Cascavel	Nova Aurora
Oeste Paranaense	Cascavel	Santa Lúcia
Oeste Paranaense	Cascavel	Santa Tereza do Oeste
Oeste Paranaense	Cascavel	Três Barras do Paraná
Oeste Paranaense	Foz do Iguaçu	Céu Azul
Oeste Paranaense	Foz do Iguaçu	Foz do Iguaçu
Oeste Paranaense	Foz do Iguaçu	Itaipulândia
Oeste Paranaense	Foz do Iguaçu	Matelândia
Oeste Paranaense	Foz do Iguaçu	Medianeira
Oeste Paranaense	Foz do Iguaçu	Missal
Oeste Paranaense	Foz do Iguaçu	Ramilândia
Oeste Paranaense	Foz do Iguaçu	Santa Terezinha de Itaipu
Oeste Paranaense	Foz do Iguaçu	São Miguel do Iguaçu
Oeste Paranaense	Foz do Iguaçu	Serranópolis do Iguaçu
Oeste Paranaense	Foz do Iguaçu	Vera Cruz do Oeste
Oeste Paranaense	Toledo	Assis Chateaubriand
Oeste Paranaense	Toledo	Diamante d'Oeste
Oeste Paranaense	Toledo	Entre Rios do Oeste
Oeste Paranaense	Toledo	Formosa do Oeste
Oeste Paranaense	Toledo	Guaíra
Oeste Paranaense	Toledo	Iracema do Oeste
Oeste Paranaense	Toledo	Jesuítas
Oeste Paranaense	Toledo	Marechal Cândido Rondon
Oeste Paranaense	Toledo	Maripá
Oeste Paranaense	Toledo	Mercedes
Oeste Paranaense	Toledo	Nova Santa Rosa
Oeste Paranaense	Toledo	Ouro Verde do Oeste
Oeste Paranaense	Toledo	Palotina
Oeste Paranaense	Toledo	Pato Bragado
Oeste Paranaense	Toledo	Quatro Pontes
Oeste Paranaense	Toledo	Santa Helena
Oeste Paranaense	Toledo	São José das Palmeiras
Oeste Paranaense	Toledo	São Pedro do Iguaçu
Oeste Paranaense	Toledo	Terra Roxa
Oeste Paranaense	Toledo	Toledo
Oeste Paranaense	Toledo	Tupãssi
Sudeste Paranaense	Irati	Irati
Sudeste Paranaense	Irati	Mallet
Sudeste Paranaense	Irati	Rebouças
Sudeste Paranaense	Irati	Rio Azul
Sudeste Paranaense	Prudentópolis	Fernandes Pinheiro
Sudeste Paranaense	Prudentópolis	Guamiranga
Sudeste Paranaense	Prudentópolis	Imbituva
Sudeste Paranaense	Prudentópolis	Ipiranga
Sudeste Paranaense	Prudentópolis	Ivaí
Sudeste Paranaense	Prudentópolis	Prudentópolis
Sudeste Paranaense	Prudentópolis	Teixeira Soares
Sudeste Paranaense	São Mateus do Sul	Antônio Olinto
Sudeste Paranaense	São Mateus do Sul	São João do Triunfo
Sudeste Paranaense	São Mateus do Sul	São Mateus do Sul
Sudeste Paranaense	União da Vitória	Bituruna
Sudeste Paranaense	União da Vitória	Cruz Machado
Sudeste Paranaense	União da Vitória	General Carneiro
Sudeste Paranaense	União da Vitória	Paula Freitas
Sudeste Paranaense	União da Vitória	Paulo Frontin
Sudeste Paranaense	União da Vitória	Porto Vitória
Sudeste Paranaense	União da Vitória	União da Vitória
Sudoeste Paranaense	Capanema	Ampére
Sudoeste Paranaense	Capanema	Bela Vista da Caroba
Sudoeste Paranaense	Capanema	Capanema
Sudoeste Paranaense	Capanema	Pérola d'Oeste
Sudoeste Paranaense	Capanema	Planalto
Sudoeste Paranaense	Capanema	Pranchita
Sudoeste Paranaense	Capanema	Realeza
Sudoeste Paranaense	Capanema	Santa Izabel do Oeste
Sudoeste Paranaense	Francisco Beltrão	Barracão
Sudoeste Paranaense	Francisco Beltrão	Boa Esperança do Iguaçu
Sudoeste Paranaense	Francisco Beltrão	Bom Jesus do Sul
Sudoeste Paranaense	Francisco Beltrão	Cruzeiro do Iguaçu
Sudoeste Paranaense	Francisco Beltrão	Dois Vizinhos
Sudoeste Paranaense	Francisco Beltrão	Enéas Marques
Sudoeste Paranaense	Francisco Beltrão	Flor da Serra do Sul
Sudoeste Paranaense	Francisco Beltrão	Francisco Beltrão
Sudoeste Paranaense	Francisco Beltrão	Manfrinópolis
Sudoeste Paranaense	Francisco Beltrão	Marmeleiro
Sudoeste Paranaense	Francisco Beltrão	Nova Esperança do Sudoeste
Sudoeste Paranaense	Francisco Beltrão	Nova Prata do Iguaçu
Sudoeste Paranaense	Francisco Beltrão	Pinhal de São Bento
Sudoeste Paranaense	Francisco Beltrão	Renascença
Sudoeste Paranaense	Francisco Beltrão	Salgado Filho
Sudoeste Paranaense	Francisco Beltrão	Salto do Lontra
Sudoeste Paranaense	Francisco Beltrão	Santo Antônio do Sudoeste
Sudoeste Paranaense	Francisco Beltrão	São Jorge d'Oeste
Sudoeste Paranaense	Francisco Beltrão	Verê
Sudoeste Paranaense	Pato Branco	Bom Sucesso do Sul
Sudoeste Paranaense	Pato Branco	Chopinzinho
Sudoeste Paranaense	Pato Branco	Coronel Vivida
Sudoeste Paranaense	Pato Branco	Itapejara d'Oeste
Sudoeste Paranaense	Pato Branco	Mariópolis
Sudoeste Paranaense	Pato Branco	Pato Branco
Sudoeste Paranaense	Pato Branco	São João
Sudoeste Paranaense	Pato Branco	Saudade do Iguaçu
Sudoeste Paranaense	Pato Branco	Sulina
Sudoeste Paranaense	Pato Branco	Vitorino

== See also ==
- Geography of Brazil
- List of cities in Brazil
