= Cruzmaltina =

Coordinates: 24.0128°S 51.4589°W

- Municipality
- Interactive map of Cruzmaltina
- Country: Brazil
- Region: Southern
- State: Paraná
- Mesoregion: Norte Central Paranaense

Population (2020)
  - Total: 2,921
- Time zone: UTC−3 (BRT)

Cruzmaltina is a municipality in the state of Paraná in the Southern Region of Brazil.

== See also ==
- List of municipalities in Paraná
