= Brasilândia do Sul =

Coordinates: 24.1969°S 53.525°W

- Municipality
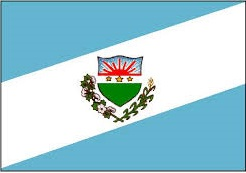
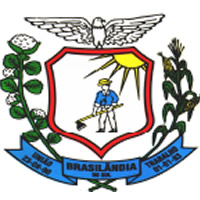
- Flag Coat of arms
- Interactive map of Brasilândia do Sul
- Country: Brazil
- Region: Southern
- State: Paraná
- Mesoregion: Noroeste Paranaense

Population (2020)
  - Total: 2,585
- Time zone: UTC−3 (BRT)

Brasilândia do Sul is a municipality in the state of Paraná in the Southern Region of Brazil. Its estimated population in 2020 was 2,585.

== See also ==
- List of municipalities in Paraná
