= Nova Santa Bárbara =

Coordinates: 23.5969°S 50.7239°W

- Municipality
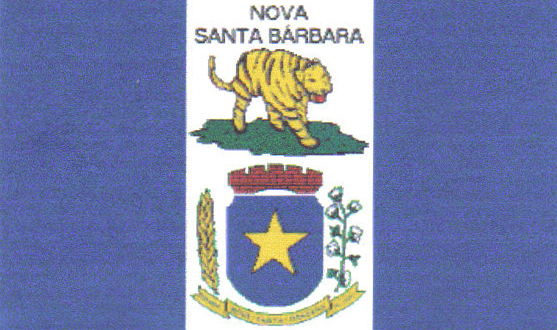
- Flag
- Interactive map of Nova Santa Bárbara
- Country: Brazil
- Region: Southern
- State: Paraná
- Mesoregion: Norte Pioneiro Paranaense

Population (2020)
  - Total: 4,277
- Time zone: UTC−3 (BRT)

Nova Santa Bárbara is a municipality in the state of Paraná in the Southern Region of Brazil.

== See also ==
- List of municipalities in Paraná
