= Santo Antônio do Paraíso =

- Municipality
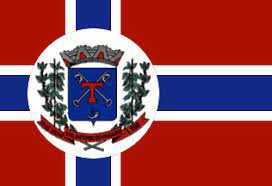
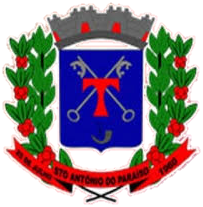
- Flag Coat of arms

- Location in Paraná state

- Location in Brazil
- Coordinates: 23°29′38″S 50°38′45″W
- Country: Brazil
- State: Paraná

Area
  - Total: 165.90 km^{2} (64.05 sq mi)

Population (2020)
  - Total: 2,068
  - Density: 12.47/km^{2} (32.29/sq mi)
- Time zone: UTC−3 (BRT)

Santo Antônio do Paraíso (Portuguese meaning "Saint Anthony of paradise") is a municipality of the state of Paraná, Brazil. The population is 2,068 (2020 est.) in an area of 165.90 km^{2}.

== See also ==
- List of municipalities in Paraná
