= Sabáudia =

Coordinates: 23°18′S 51°33′W

- Municipality
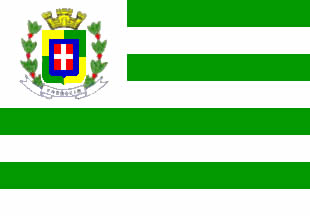
- Flag
- Interactive map of Sabáudia
- Country: Brazil
- Region: Southern
- State: Paraná
- Mesoregion: Noroeste Paranaense

Population (2020)
  - Total: 6,891
- Time zone: UTC−3 (BRT)

Sabáudia is a municipality in the state of Paraná in the Southern Region of Brazil.

== See also ==
- List of municipalities in Paraná
