= São Pedro do Ivaí =

- Municipality
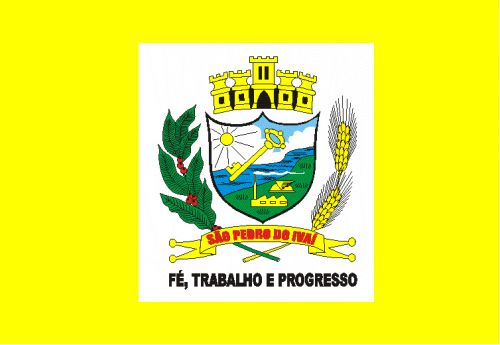
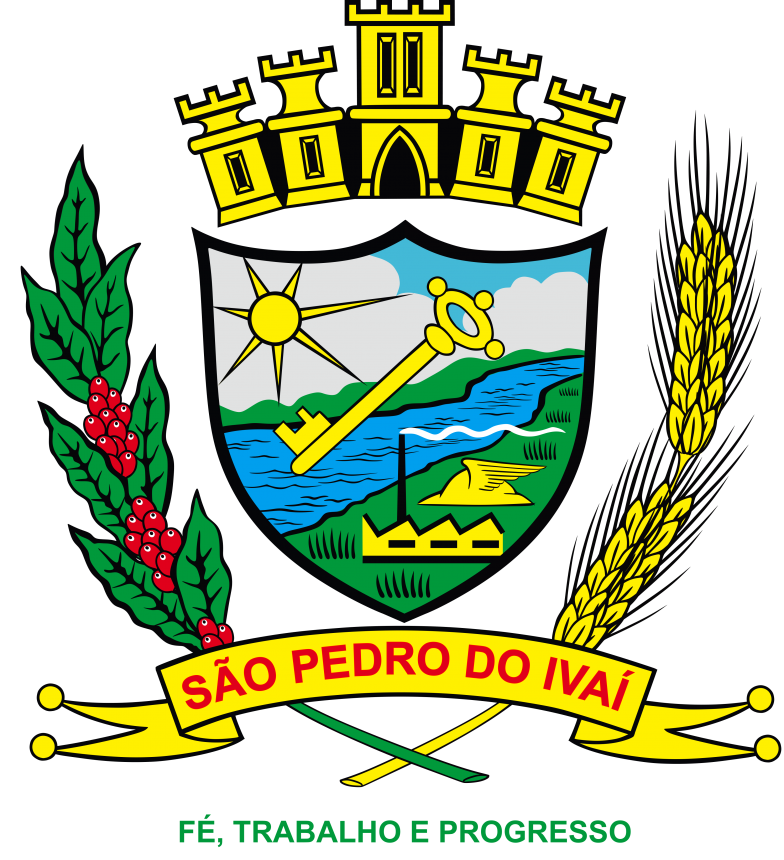
- Flag Coat of arms

- Location in Brazil
- Coordinates: 23°51′54″S 51°51′21″W
- Country: Brazil
- Region: Southern
- State: Paraná
- Mesoregion: Norte Central Paranaense

Population (2020)
  - Total: 11,046
- Time zone: UTC−3 (BRT)

São Pedro do Ivaí is a municipality in the state of Paraná in the Southern Region of Brazil.

== See also ==
- List of municipalities in Paraná
