= Ramilândia =

Coordinates: 25.12°S 54.025°W

- Municipality
- Interactive map of Ramilândia
- Country: Brazil
- Region: Southern
- State: Paraná
- Mesoregion: Oeste Paranaense

Population (2020)
  - Total: 4,476
- Time zone: UTC−3 (BRT)

Ramilândia is a municipality in the state of Paraná in the Southern Region of Brazil.

== See also ==
- List of municipalities in Paraná
