= Arapuã =

Coordinates: 24.3158°S 51.7869°W

- Municipality
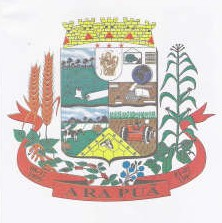
- Coat of arms
- Interactive map of Arapuã
- Country: Brazil
- Region: Southern
- State: Paraná
- Mesoregion: Norte Central Paranaense

Population (2020)
  - Total: 3,009
- Time zone: UTC−3 (BRT)

Arapuã is a municipality in the state of Paraná in the Southern Region of Brazil.

== See also ==
- List of municipalities in Paraná
