= Rancho Alegre, Paraná =

Coordinates: 23°04′12″S 50°54′46″W

Rancho Alegre
- Municipality
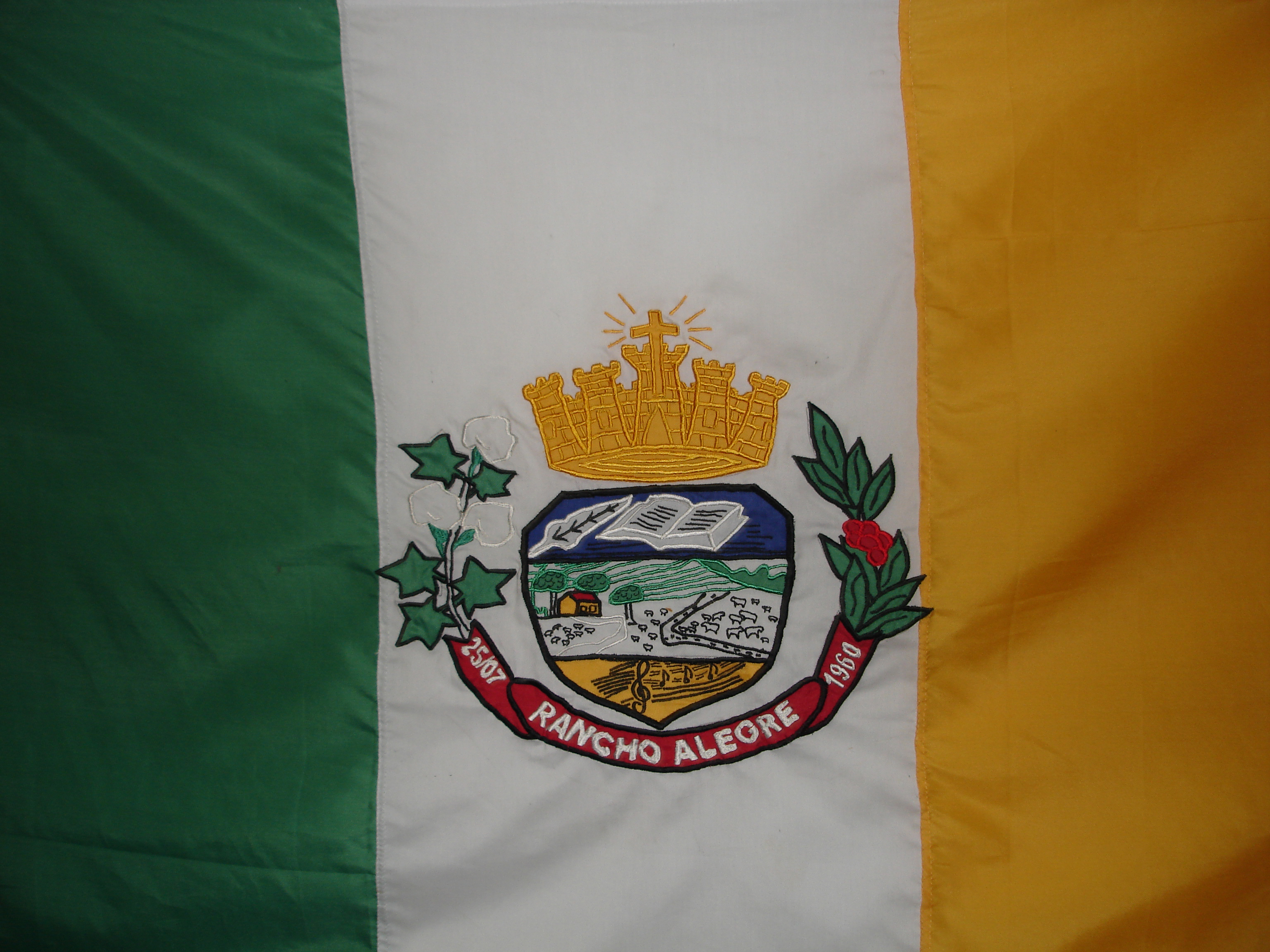
- Flag
- Interactive map of Rancho Alegre
- Country: Brazil
- Region: Southern
- State: Paraná
- Mesoregion: Norte Pioneiro Paranaense

Population (2020)
  - Total: 3,784
- Time zone: UTC−3 (BRT)

Rancho Alegre is a municipality in the state of Paraná in the Southern Region of Brazil.

== See also ==
- List of municipalities in Paraná
