= Leópolis =

Municipality in Brazil

Coordinates: 23°04′S 50°45′W

- Municipality
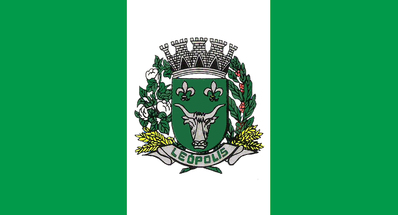
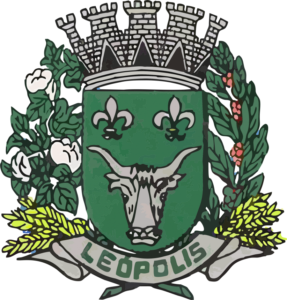
- Flag Coat of arms
- Interactive map of Leópolis
- Country: Brazil
- Region: Southern
- State: Paraná
- Mesoregion: Norte Pioneiro Paranaense

Population (2020)
  - Total: 3,925
- Time zone: UTC−3 (BRT)

Leópolis is a municipality in the state of Paraná in the Southern Region of Brazil.

== See also ==
- List of municipalities in Paraná
