= São Jorge do Patrocínio =

Coordinates: 23.7408°S 53.9269°W

- Municipality
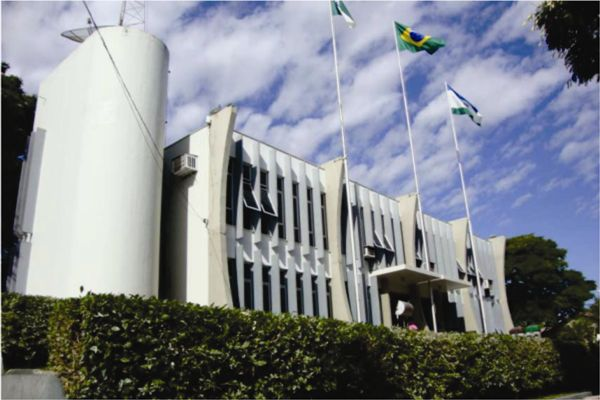

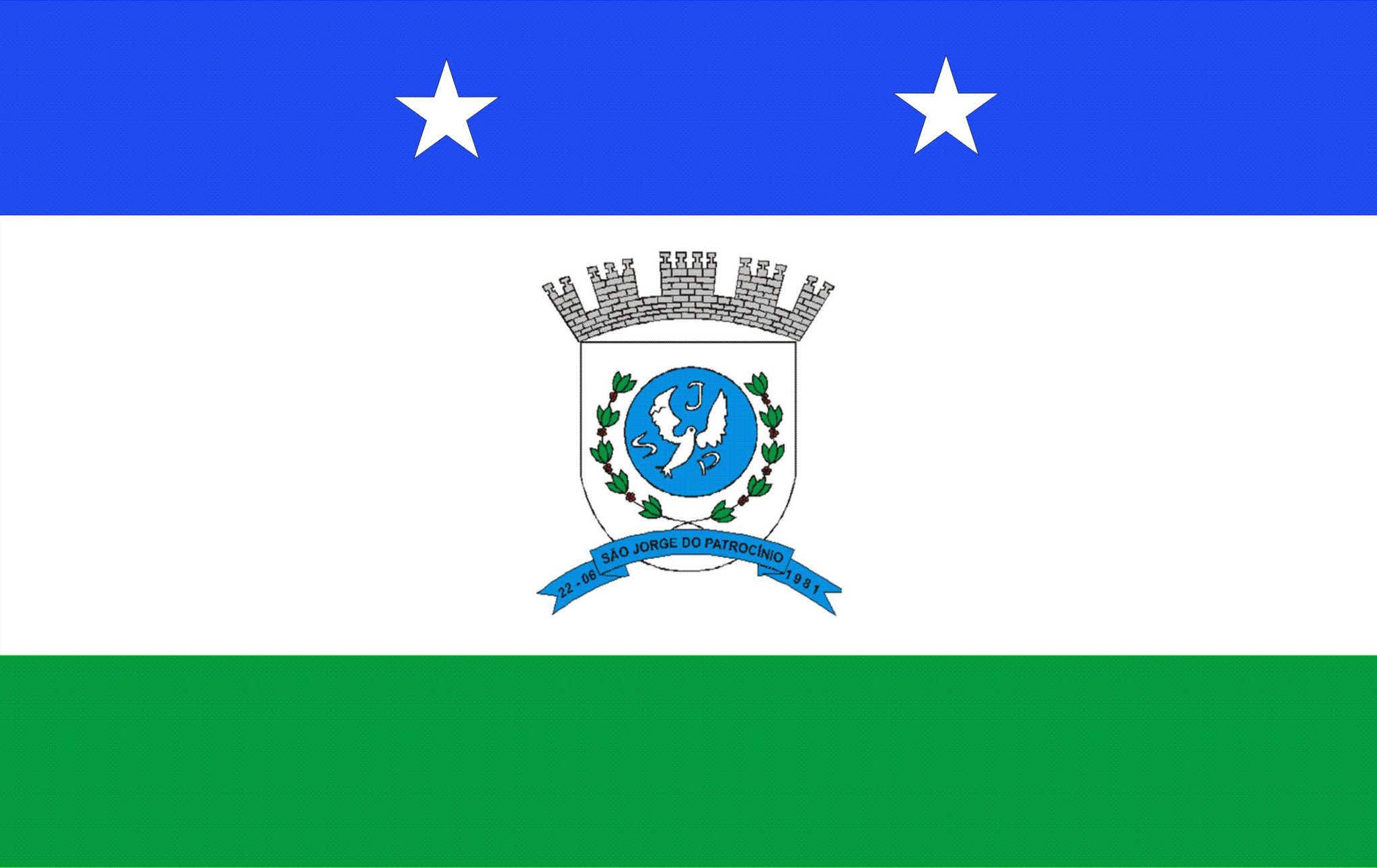
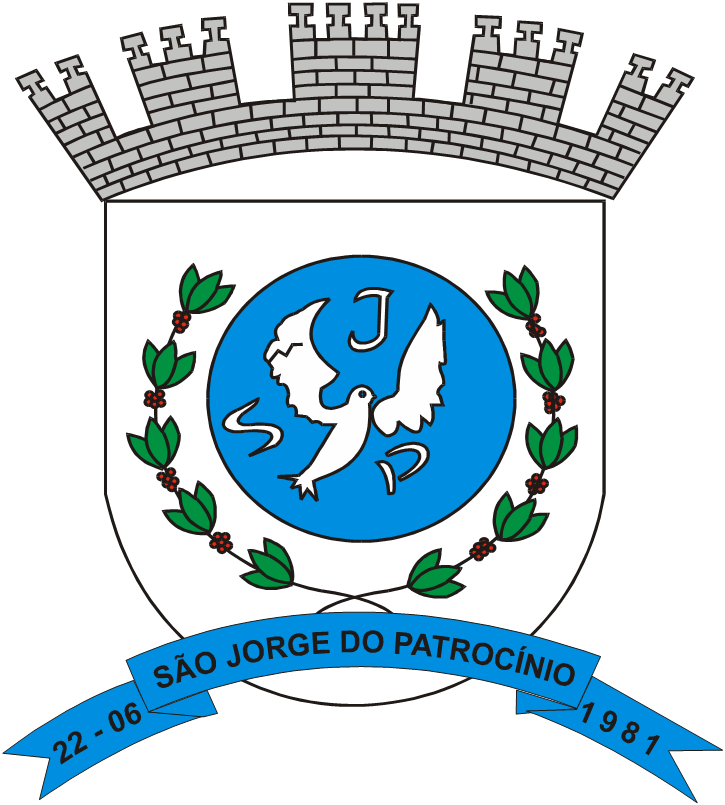
- Flag Coat of arms
- Interactive map of São Jorge do Patrocínio
- Country: Brazil
- Region: Southern
- State: Paraná
- Mesoregion: Noroeste Paranaense

Population (2020)
  - Total: 5,586
- Time zone: UTC−3 (BRT)

São Jorge do Patrocínio is a municipality in the state of Paraná in the Southern Region of Brazil.

== See also ==
- List of municipalities in Paraná
