= Nova Esperança do Sudoeste =

- Municipality
- Location in Brazil
- Coordinates: 25°54′25″S 53°15′46″W
- Country: Brazil
- Region: Southern
- State: Paraná
- Mesoregion: Sudoeste Paranaense
- Founded: March 19, 1992

Area
  - Total: 208.472 km^{2} (80.491 sq mi)
- Elevation: 625 m (2,051 ft)

Population (2020)
  - Total: 5,030
  - Density: 24.1/km^{2} (62.5/sq mi)
- Time zone: UTC−3 (BRT)
- Post code: 85635
- Area code: (+55) 46

Nova Esperança do Sudoeste is a municipality in the state of Paraná in the Southern Region of Brazil.

== See also ==
- List of municipalities in Paraná
