= Jesuítas =

Coordinates: 22°53′S 43°41′W

- Municipality
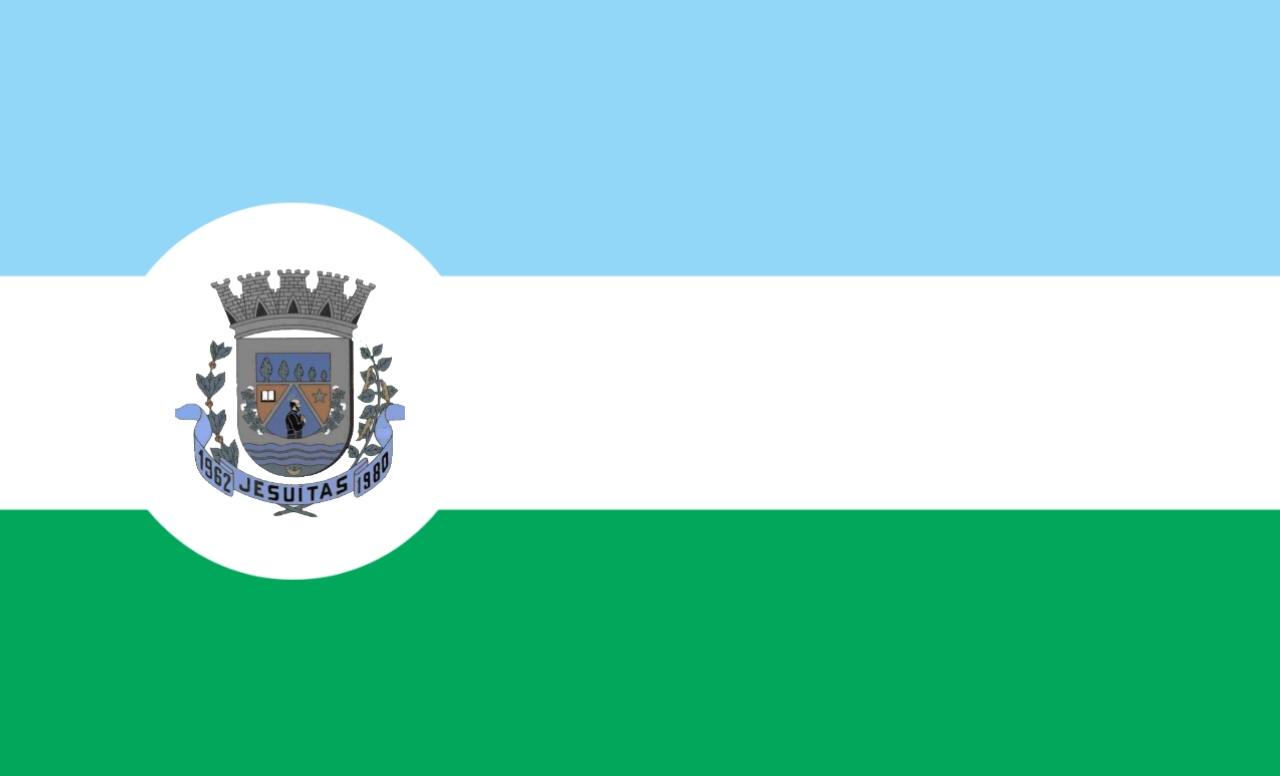
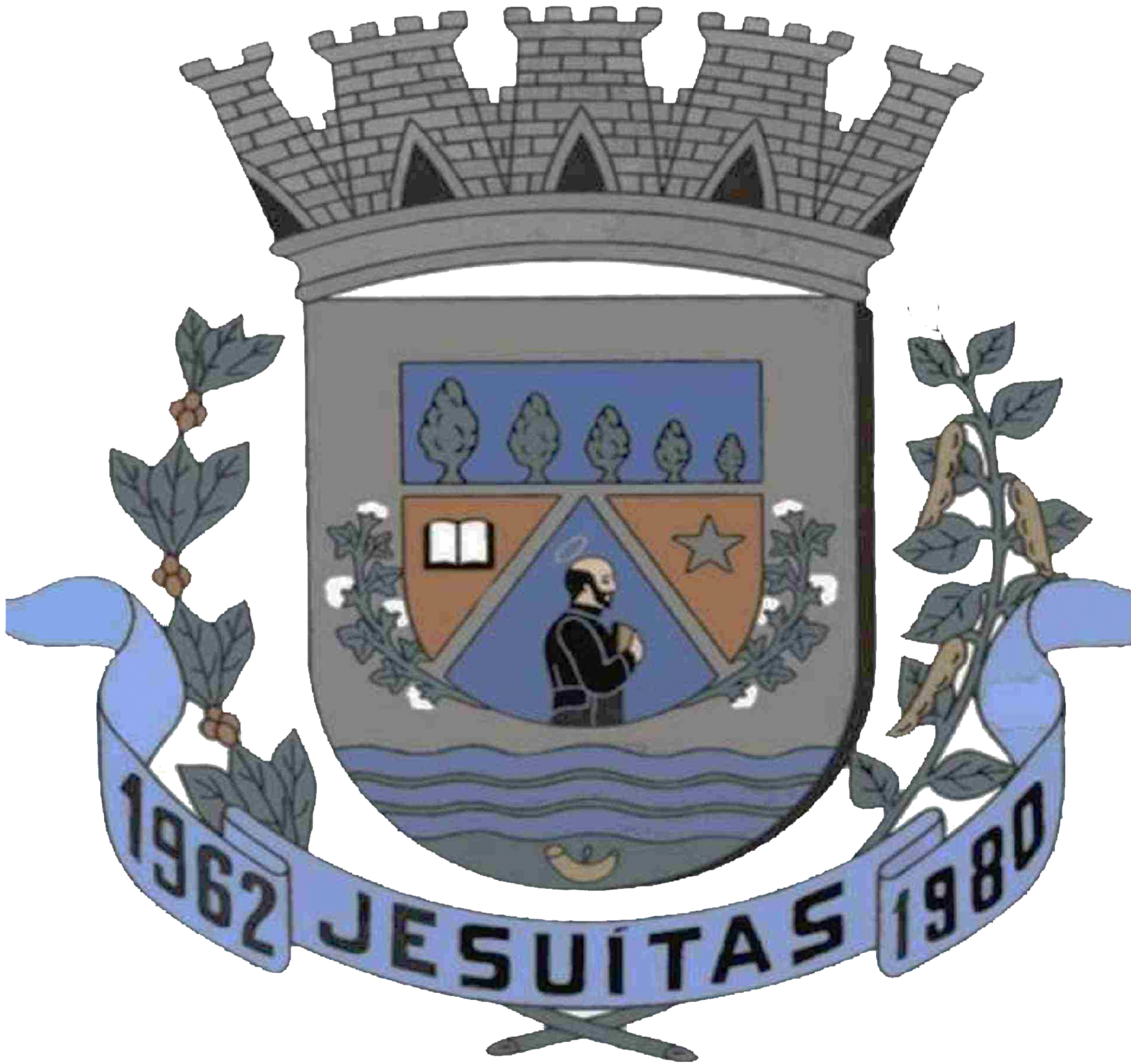
- Flag Coat of arms
- Interactive map of Jesuítas
- Country: Brazil
- Region: Southern
- State: Paraná
- Mesoregion: Oeste Paranaense

Population (2020)
  - Total: 8,330
- Time zone: UTC−3 (BRT)

Jesuítas is a municipality in the state of Paraná in the Southern Region of Brazil.

The name derives from the Society of Jesus for a missionary presence they had.

== See also ==
- List of municipalities in Paraná
