= Iguatu, Paraná =

Iguatu
- Municipality
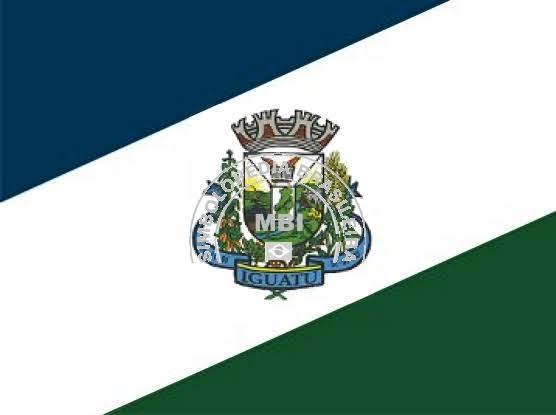
- Flag Coat of arms

- Location in Paraná state

- Location in Brazil
- Coordinates: 24°43′1″S 53°5′2″W
- Country: Brazil
- Region: South
- State: Paraná

Population (2020)
  - Total: 2,253
- Time zone: UTC−3 (BRT)

Iguatu is a municipality in the state of Paraná in the Southern Region of Brazil.

== See also ==
- List of municipalities in Paraná
