= Florestópolis =

Coordinates: 22°52′S 51°24′W

- Municipality
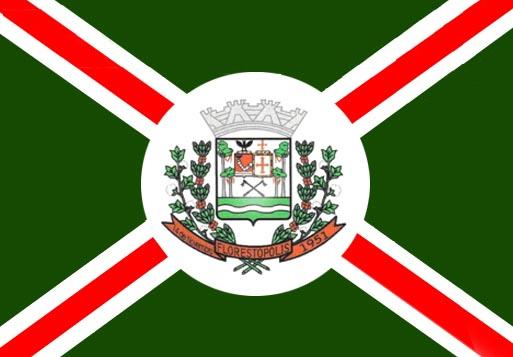
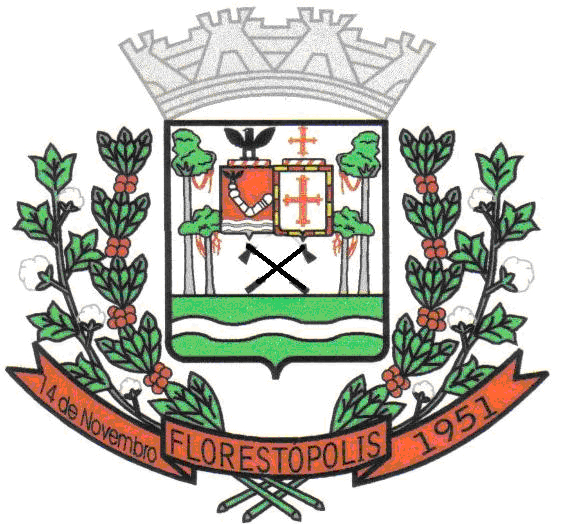
- Flag Coat of arms
- Interactive map of Florestópolis
- Country: Brazil
- Region: Southern
- State: Paraná
- Mesoregion: Norte Central Paranaense

Population (2020)
  - Total: 10,453
- Time zone: UTC−3 (BRT)

Florestópolis is a municipality in the state of Paraná in the Southern Region of Brazil.

== See also ==
- List of municipalities in Paraná
