= Flor da Serra do Sul =

Coordinates: 26.2569°S 53.3069°W

- Municipality
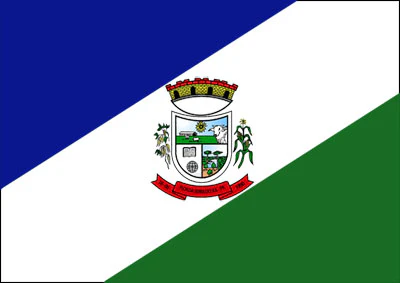
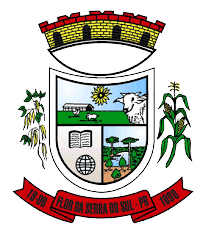
- Flag Coat of arms
- Interactive map of Flor da Serra do Sul
- Country: Brazil
- Region: Southern
- State: Paraná
- Mesoregion: Sudoeste Paranaense

Population (2020)
  - Total: 4,603
- Time zone: UTC−3 (BRT)

Flor da Serra do Sul is a municipality in the state of Paraná in the Southern Region of Brazil.

== See also ==
- List of municipalities in Paraná
