= Cafezal do Sul =

Coordinates: 23.9019°S 53.5128°W

- Municipality
- Interactive map of Cafezal do Sul
- Country: Brazil
- Region: Southern
- State: Paraná
- Mesoregion: Noroeste Paranaense

Population (2020)
  - Total: 4,009
- Time zone: UTC−3 (BRT)

Cafezal do Sul is a municipality in the state of Paraná in the Southern Region of Brazil.

== See also ==
- List of municipalities in Paraná
