= Novo Itacolomi =

Coordinates: 23.7639°S 51.5069°W

- Municipality
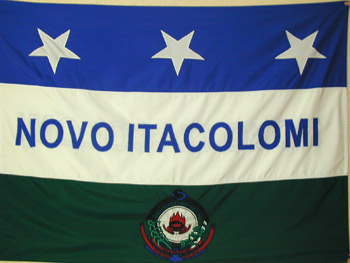
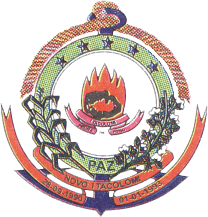
- Flag Coat of arms
- Interactive map of Novo Itacolomi
- Country: Brazil
- Region: Southern
- State: Paraná
- Mesoregion: Noroeste Paranaense

Population (2020)
  - Total: 2,840
- Time zone: UTC−3 (BRT)

Novo Itacolomi is a municipality in the state of Paraná in the Southern Region of Brazil.

== See also ==
- List of municipalities in Paraná
