= Porto Vitória =

Coordinates: 26.1608°S 51.2319°W

- Municipality
- Flag Coat of arms
- Interactive map of Porto Vitória
- Country: Brazil
- Region: Southern
- State: Paraná
- Mesoregion: Sudeste Paranaense

Population (2020)
  - Total: 4,061
- Time zone: UTC−3 (BRT)

Porto Vitória is a municipality in the state of Paraná in the Southern Region of Brazil.

== See also ==
- List of municipalities in Paraná
