= Salto do Itararé =

Coordinates: 23°35′S 49°37′W

- Municipality
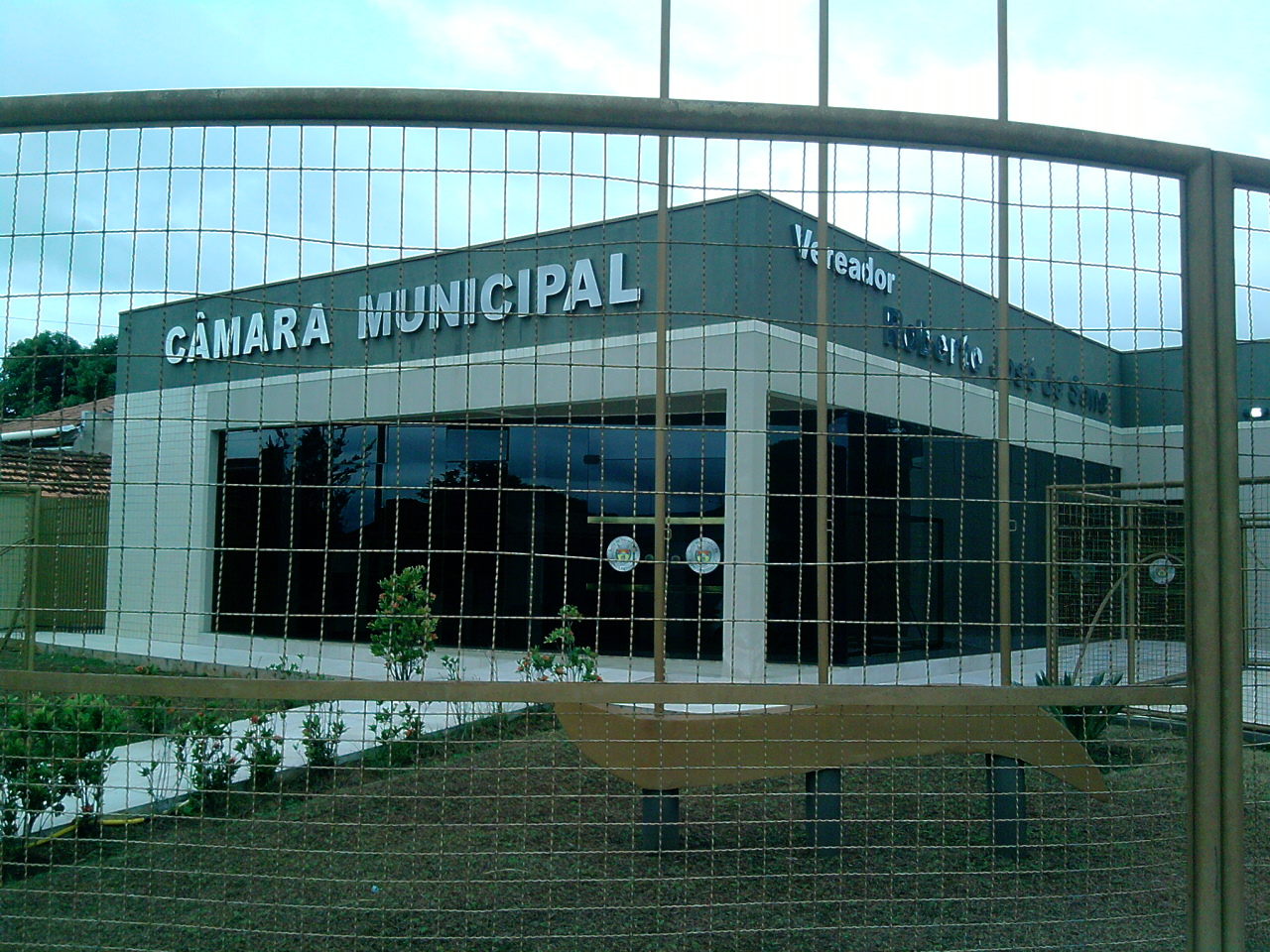

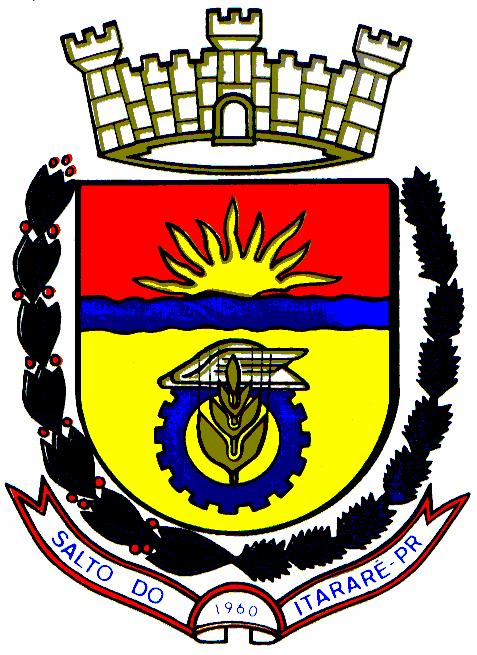
- Coat of arms

- Country: Brazil
- Region: Southern
- State: Paraná
- Mesoregion: Norte Pioneiro Paranaense

Population (2020)
  - Total: 4,898
- Time zone: UTC−3 (BRT)

Salto do Itararé is a municipality in Paraná, Brazil.

== Administration ==
- Mayor: Israel Domingos (2009/2012)
- Vice Mayor: Francisco Antonio Gomes
- President of camara: Antonio Adilson Gomes (2009/2010)

== See also ==
- List of municipalities in Paraná
- States of Brazil
