= Santa Inês, Paraná =

Santa Inês
- Municipality
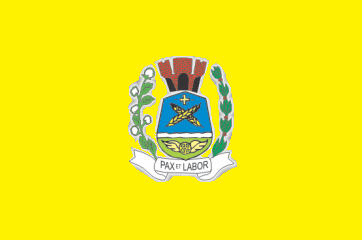
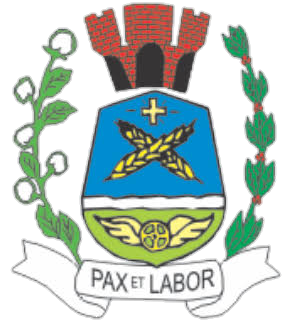
- Flag Coat of arms

- Location in Paraná state

- Location in Brazil
- Coordinates: 22°38′16″S 51°54′10″W
- Country: Brazil
- Region: South
- State: Paraná

Population (2020)
  - Total: 1,594
- Time zone: UTC−3 (BRT)

Santa Inês is a municipality in the state of Paraná in the Southern Region of Brazil.

== See also ==
- List of municipalities in Paraná
