= Nova Fátima, Paraná =

Nova Fátima
- Municipality
- Location in Paraná state

- Location in Brazil
- Coordinates: 23°25′55″S 50°33′50″W
- Country: Brazil
- Region: South
- State: Paraná

Population (2020)
  - Total: 8,136
- Time zone: UTC−3 (BRT)

Nova Fátima is a municipality in the state of Paraná in the Southern Region of Brazil.

== See also ==
- List of municipalities in Paraná
