= São Pedro do Paraná =

Coordinates: 22.8239°S 53.22°W

- Municipality
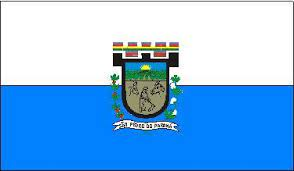
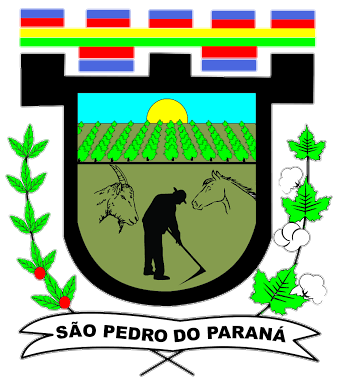
- Flag Coat of arms
- Interactive map of São Pedro do Paraná
- Country: Brazil
- Region: Southern
- State: Paraná
- Mesoregion: Noroeste Paranaense

Population (2020)
  - Total: 2,289
- Time zone: UTC−3 (BRT)

São Pedro do Paraná is a municipality in the state of Paraná in the Southern Region of Brazil.

== See also ==
- List of municipalities in Paraná
