= Vitorino, Paraná =

Coordinates: 26°16′37″S 52°47′02″W

- Municipality
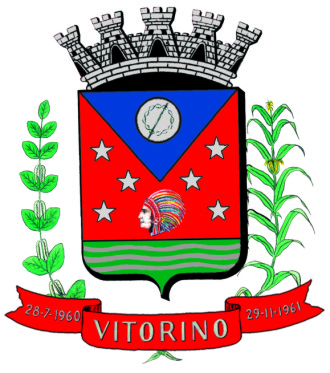
- Flag Coat of arms
- Interactive map of Vitorino, Paraná
- Country: Brazil
- Region: Southern
- State: Paraná
- Mesoregion: Sudoeste Paranaense

Population (2020)
  - Total: 6,859
- Time zone: UTC−3 (BRT)

Vitorino, Paraná is a municipality in the state of Paraná in the Southern Region of Brazil.

== See also ==
- List of municipalities in Paraná
