= Godoy Moreira =

Coordinates: 24.1769°S 51.9239°W

- Municipality
- Interactive map of Godoy Moreira
- Country: Brazil
- Region: Southern
- State: Paraná
- Mesoregion: Norte Central Paranaense

Population (2020)
  - Total: 2,898
- Time zone: UTC−3 (BRT)

Godoy Moreira is a municipality in the state of Paraná in the Southern Region of Brazil.

== See also ==
- List of municipalities in Paraná
