= Pranchita =

Coordinates: 26°01′S 53°44′W

- Municipality
- Flag Coat of arms
- Interactive map of Pranchita
- Country: Brazil
- Region: Southern
- State: Paraná
- Mesoregion: Sudoeste Paranaense

Population (2020)
  - Total: 5,095
- Time zone: UTC−3 (BRT)

Pranchita is a municipality in the state of Paraná in the Southern Region of Brazil.

== See also ==
- List of municipalities in Paraná
