= Campo Bonito =

- Municipality
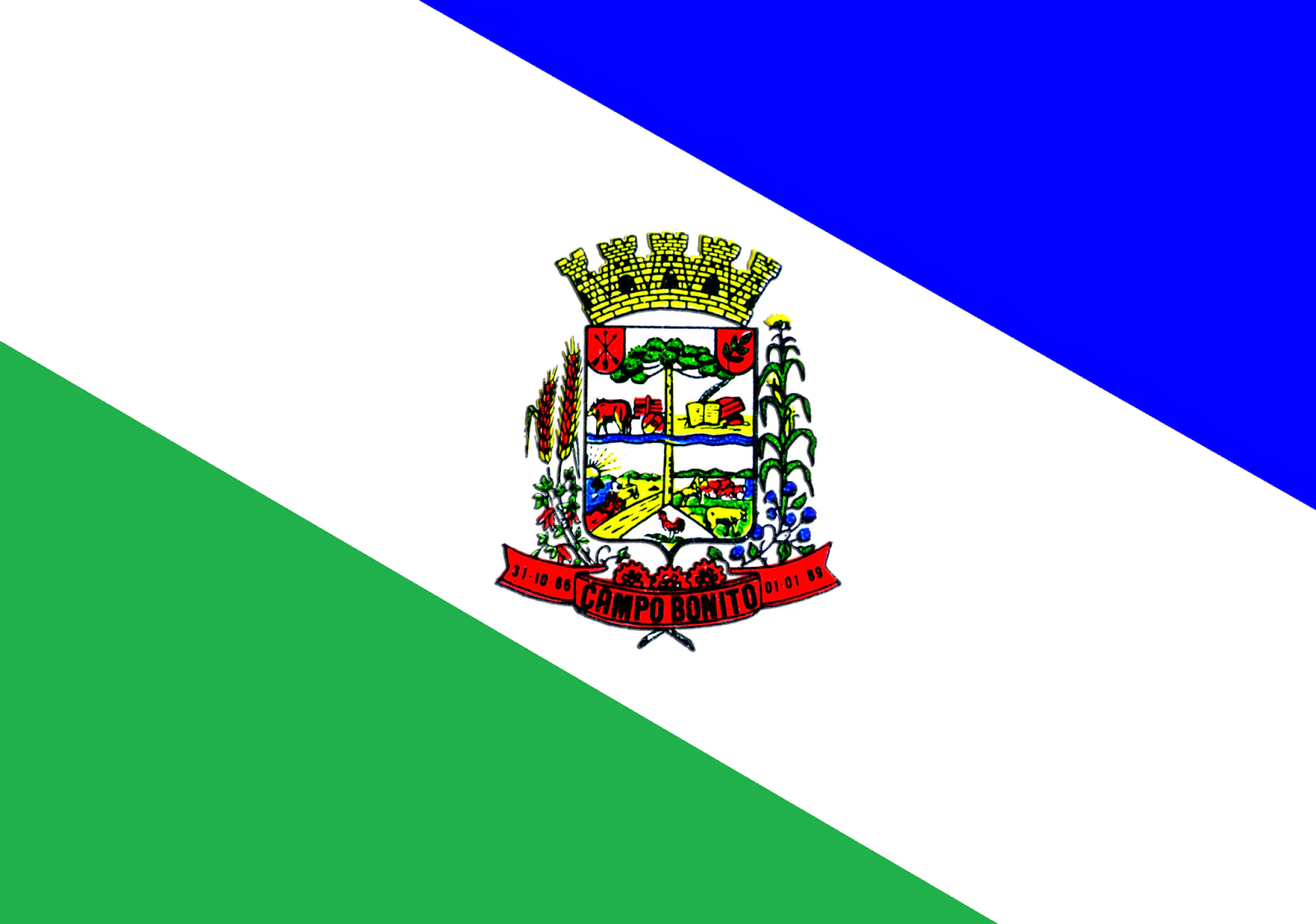
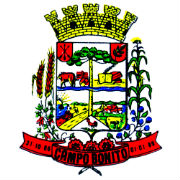
- Flag Coat of arms

- Location in Brazil
- Coordinates: 25°1′51″S 52°59′34″W
- Country: Brazil
- Region: Southern
- State: Paraná
- Mesoregion: Oeste Paranaense

Population (2020)
  - Total: 3,763
- Time zone: UTC−3 (BRT)

Campo Bonito is a municipality in the state of Paraná in the Southern Region of Brazil.

== See also ==
- List of municipalities in Paraná
