= Diamante do Sul =

Coordinates: 25.0428°S 52.68°W

- Municipality
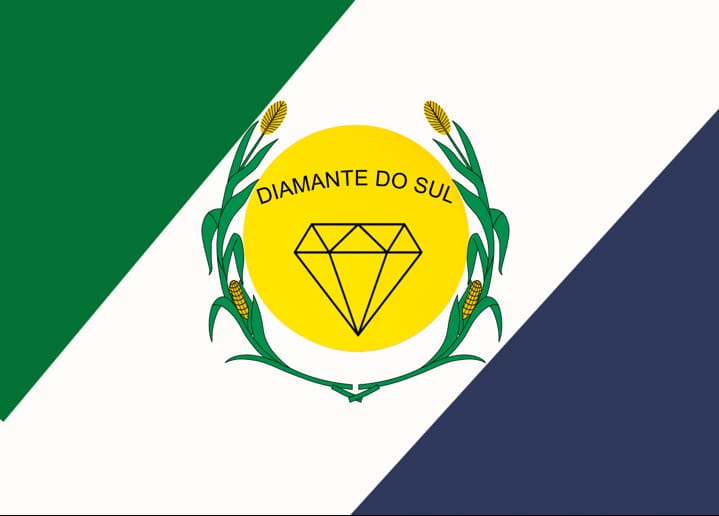
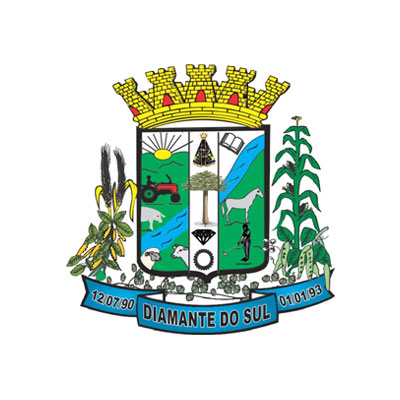
- Flag Coat of arms
- Interactive map of Diamante do Sul
- Country: Brazil
- Region: Southern
- State: Paraná
- Mesoregion: Oeste Paranaense

Population (2020)
  - Total: 3,424
- Time zone: UTC−3 (BRT)

Diamante do Sul is a municipality in the state of Paraná in the Southern Region of Brazil.

== See also ==
- List of municipalities in Paraná
