= Esperança Nova =

Coordinates: 23.7239°S 53.8108°W

- Municipality
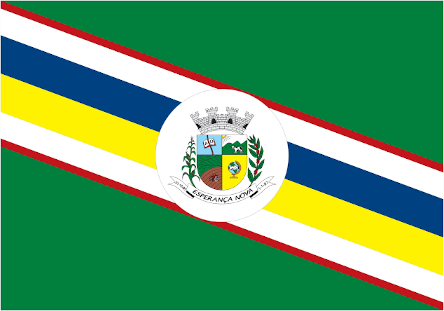
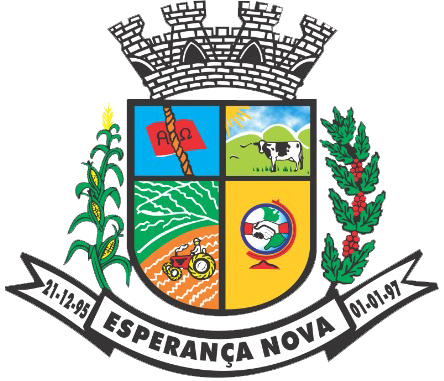
- Flag Coat of arms
- Interactive map of Esperança Nova
- Country: Brazil
- Region: Southern
- State: Paraná
- Mesoregion: Noroeste Paranaense

Population (2020)
  - Total: 1,665
- Time zone: UTC−3 (BRT)

Esperança Nova is a municipality in the state of Paraná in the Southern Region of Brazil.

== See also ==
- List of municipalities in Paraná
