= Salto do Lontra =

Coordinates: 25.7839°S 53.3089°W

- Municipality
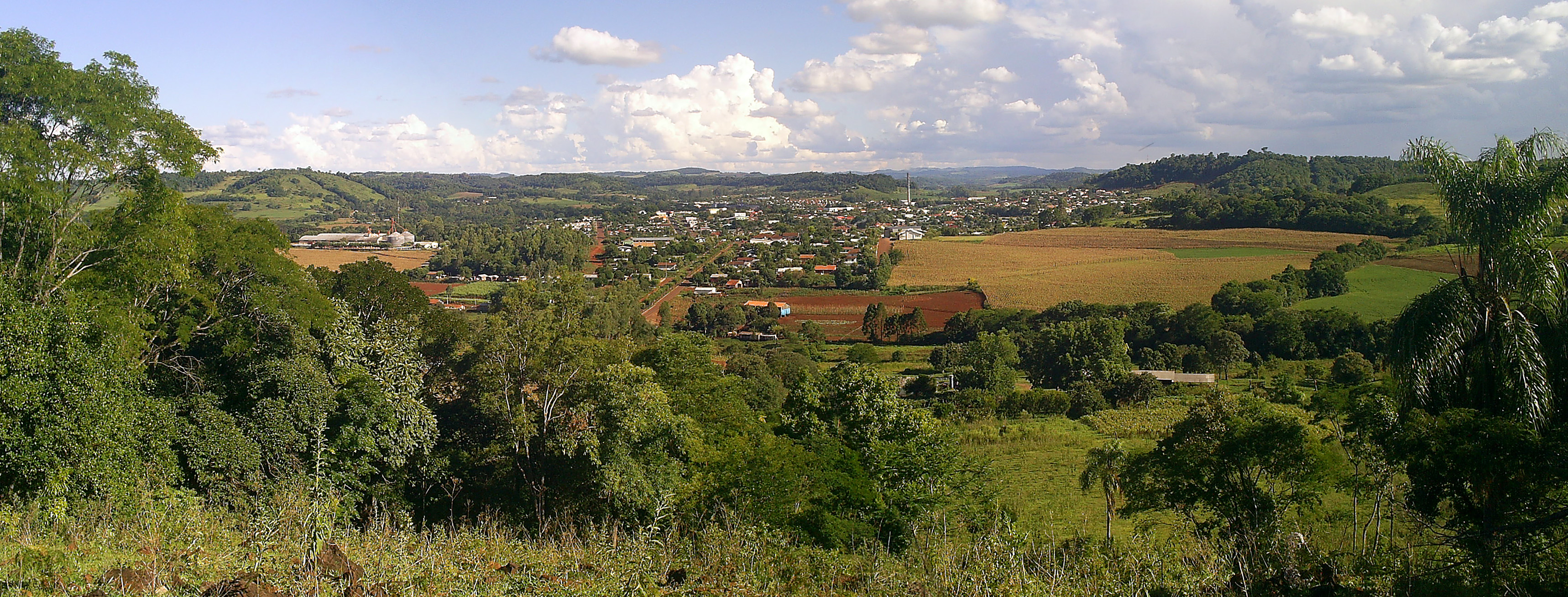

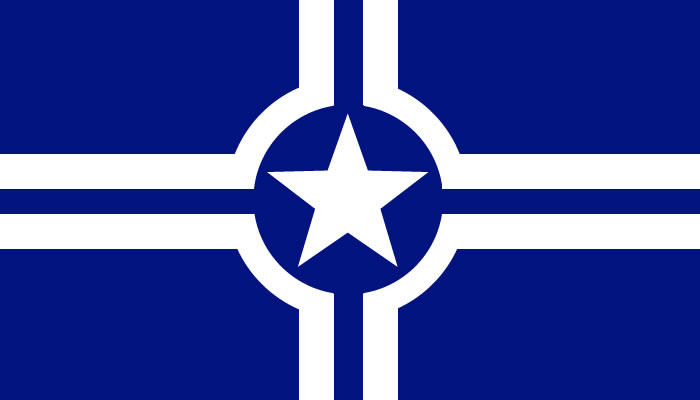
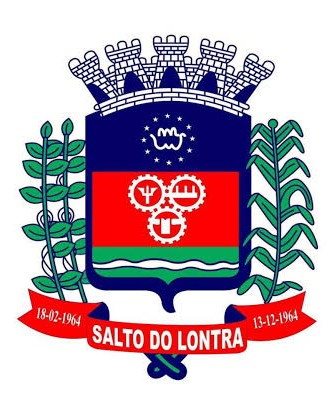
- Flag Coat of arms
- Interactive map of Salto do Lontra
- Country: Brazil
- Region: Southern
- State: Paraná
- Mesoregion: Sudoeste Paranaense

Population (2020)
  - Total: 14,872
- Time zone: UTC−3 (BRT)

Salto do Lontra is a municipality in the state of Paraná in the Southern Region of Brazil.

== See also ==
- List of municipalities in Paraná
