= Corumbataí do Sul =

Coordinates: 24.1008°S 52.12°W

- Municipality
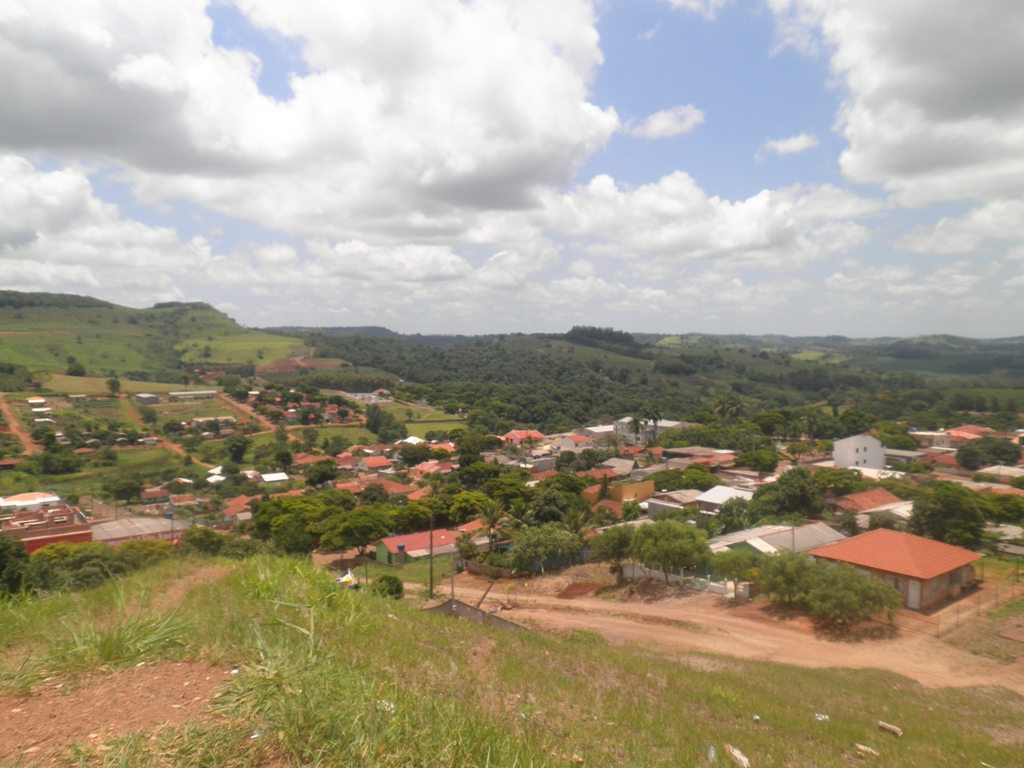

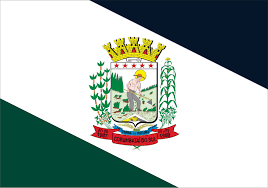
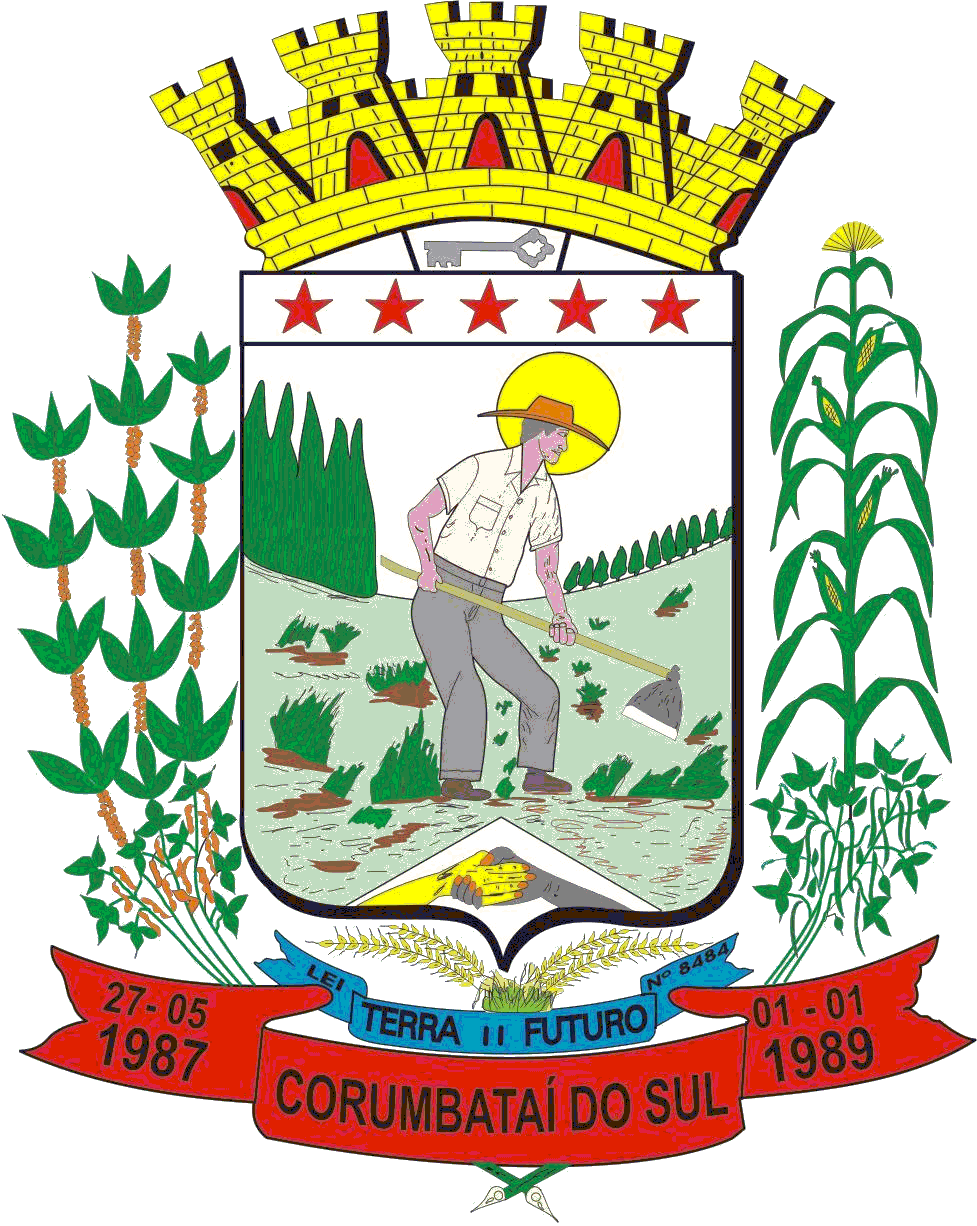
- Flag Seal

- Country: Brazil
- Region: Southern
- State: Paraná
- Mesoregion: Centro Ocidental Paranaense
- Incorporated (city): 1 January 1989

Government
  - Mayor: Alexandre Donato (PSD)

Area
  - Total: 63,452 sq mi (164,341 km^{2})

Population (2020)
  - Total: 3,127
- Time zone: UTC−3 (BRT)
- Postal code: 86970-000
- Area code: +55 44

Corumbataí do Sul is a municipality in the state of Paraná in the Southern Region of Brazil.

== Population ==
Year	Residents
1991	6,642
2000	4,946
2010	4,002
2022	3,760
2025	3,770

== Geography ==
It has an area of 164.341 km², representing 0.0825 percent of the state's territory, 0.0292 percent of the region's territory, and 0.0019 percent of the Brazilian territory.

== See also ==
- List of municipalities in Paraná
