= Japurá, Paraná =

Coordinates: 23°28′12″S 52°33′10″W

- Municipality
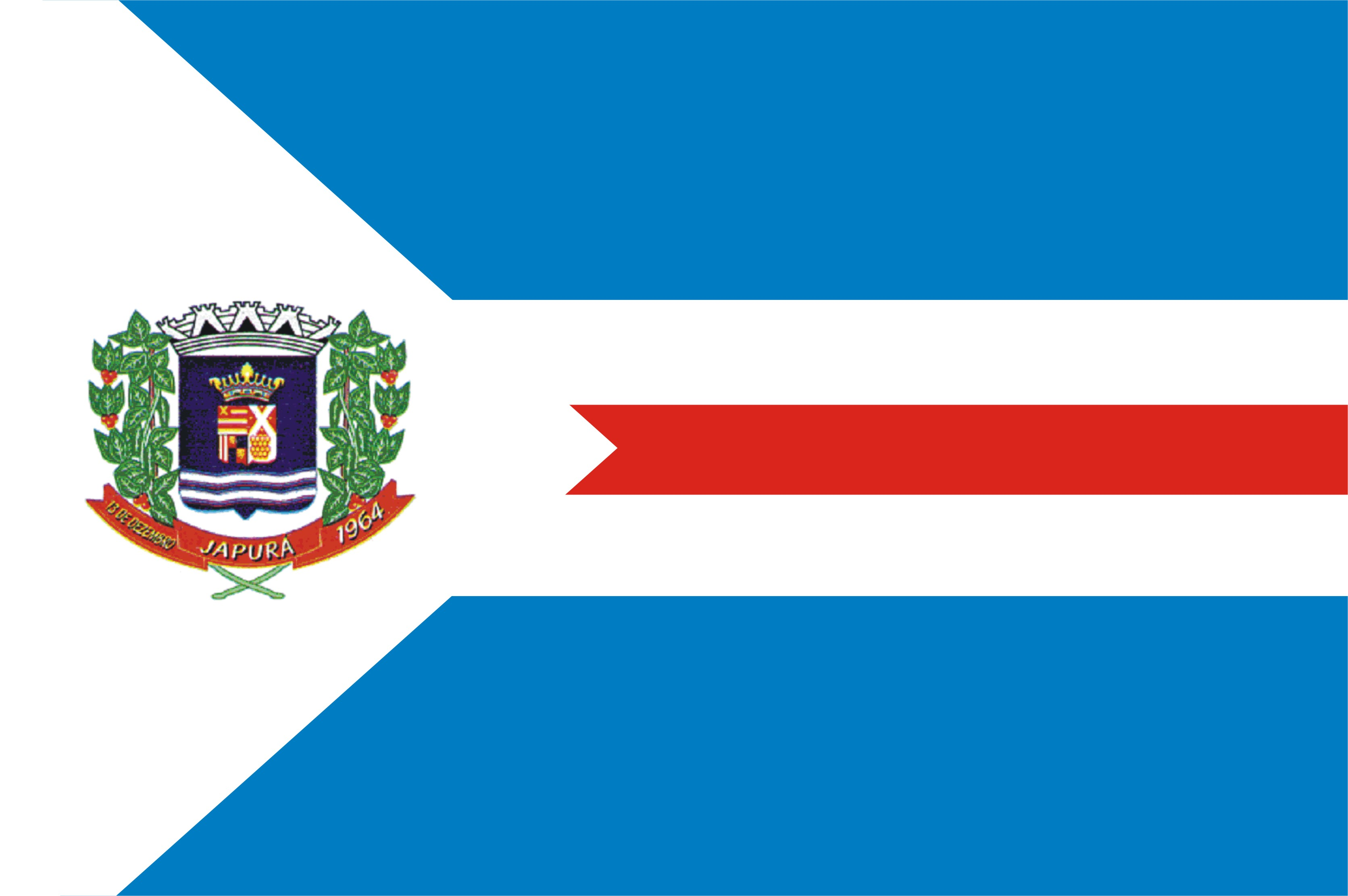
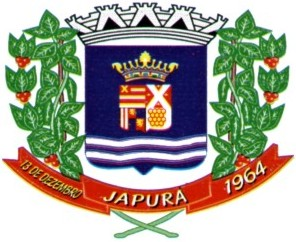
- Flag Coat of arms
- Interactive map of Japurá, Paraná
- Country: Brazil
- Region: Southern
- State: Paraná
- Mesoregion: Noroeste Paranaense

Population (2020)
  - Total: 9,500
- Time zone: UTC−3 (BRT)

Japurá, Paraná is a municipality in the state of Paraná in the Southern Region of Brazil.

== See also ==
- List of municipalities in Paraná
