= Coronel Domingos Soares =

Coordinates: 26.2278°S 52.0319°W

- Municipality
- Flag Coat of arms
- Interactive map of Coronel Domingos Soares
- Country: Brazil
- Region: Southern
- State: Paraná
- Mesoregion: Centro-Sul Paranaense

Population (2020)
  - Total: 7,518
- Time zone: UTC−3 (BRT)

Coronel Domingos Soares is a municipality in the state of Paraná in the Southern Region of Brazil.

== See also ==
- List of municipalities in Paraná
