= Rancho Alegre d'Oeste =

Coordinates: 24.3069°S 52.9539°W

- Municipality
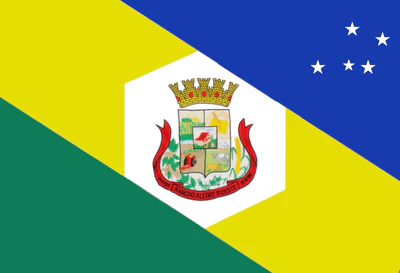
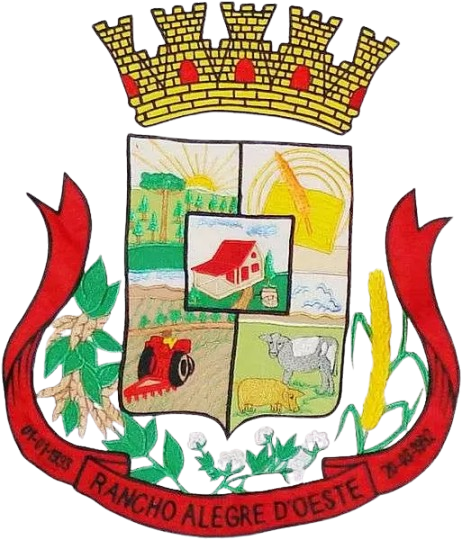
- Flag Seal

- Country: Brazil
- Region: Southern
- State: Paraná
- Mesoregion: Centro Ocidental Paranaense

Government
  - Mayor: Everton Cassio Zanuto (PSD)

Population (2020)
  - Total: 2,628
- Time zone: UTC−3 (BRT)

Rancho Alegre d'Oeste is a municipality in the state of Paraná in the Southern Region of Brazil.

== See also ==
- List of municipalities in Paraná
