= Campina da Lagoa =

Municipality in Paraná, Brazil

Coordinates: 24°33′S 52°43′W

Campina da Lagoa-PR
- Municipality
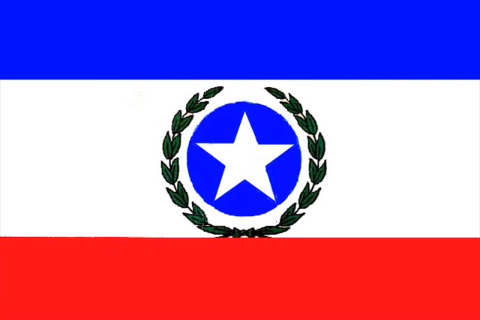
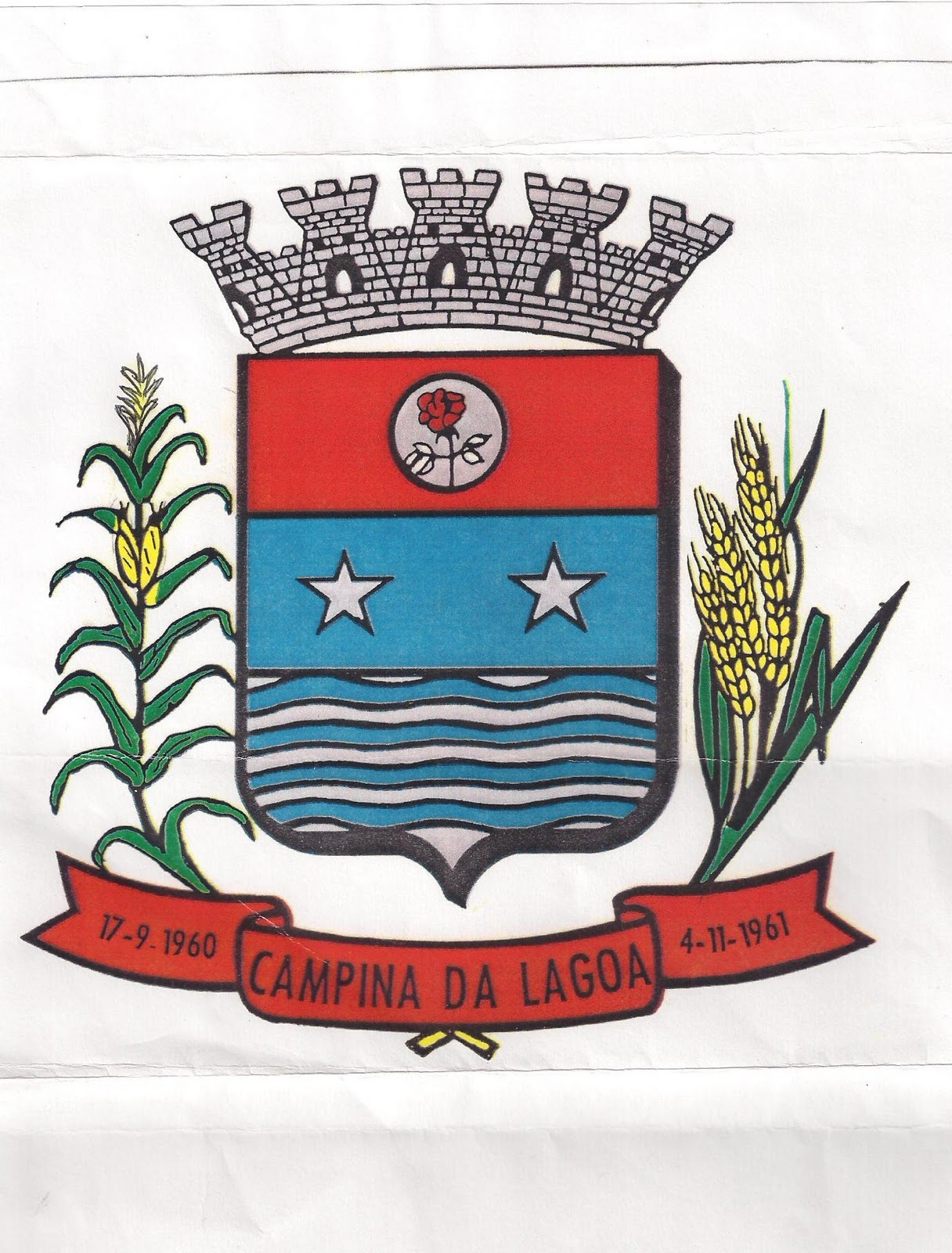
- Flag Coat of arms
- Interactive map of Campina da Lagoa-PR
- Country: Brazil
- Region: Southern
- State: Paraná
- Mesoregion: Centro Ocidental Paranaense

Population (2020)
  - Total: 14,043
- Time zone: UTC−3 (BRT)

Campina da Lagoa is a municipality in the state of Paraná in the Southern Region of Brazil.

== See also ==
- List of municipalities in Paraná
