= Guamiranga =

Coordinates: 25.1908°S 50.805°W

- Municipality
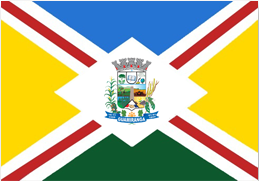
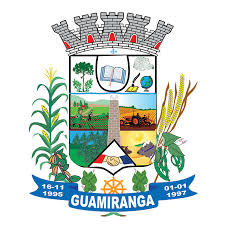
- Flag Coat of arms
- Interactive map of Guamiranga
- Country: Brazil
- Region: Southern
- State: Paraná
- Mesoregion: Sudeste Paranaense

Population (2020)
  - Total: 8,811
- Time zone: UTC−3 (BRT)

Guamiranga is a municipality in the state of Paraná in the Southern Region of Brazil.

== See also ==
- List of municipalities in Paraná
