= Cafeara =

Coordinates: 22°47′S 51°42′W

- Municipality
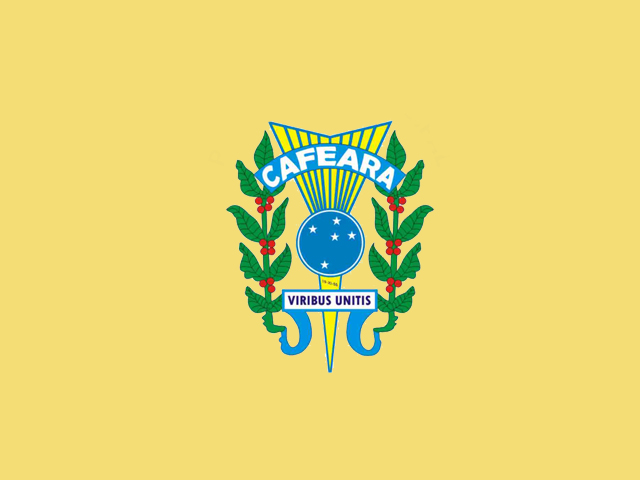
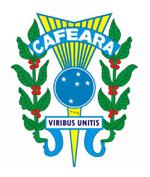
- Flag Coat of arms
- Interactive map of Cafeara
- Country: Brazil
- Region: Southern
- State: Paraná
- Mesoregion: Noroeste Paranaense

Government
  - Mayor: Oscimar Jose Sperandio

Population (2020)
  - Total: 2,954
- Time zone: UTC−3 (BRT)

Cafeara is a municipality in the state of Paraná in the Southern Region of Brazil. It is located approximately 100 km (63 miles) to the north-west of Londrina.

== See also ==
- List of municipalities in Paraná
