= Lindoeste =

Coordinates: 25.26°S 53.5758°W

- Municipality
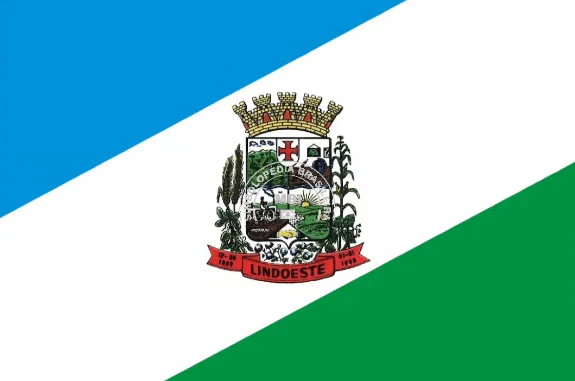
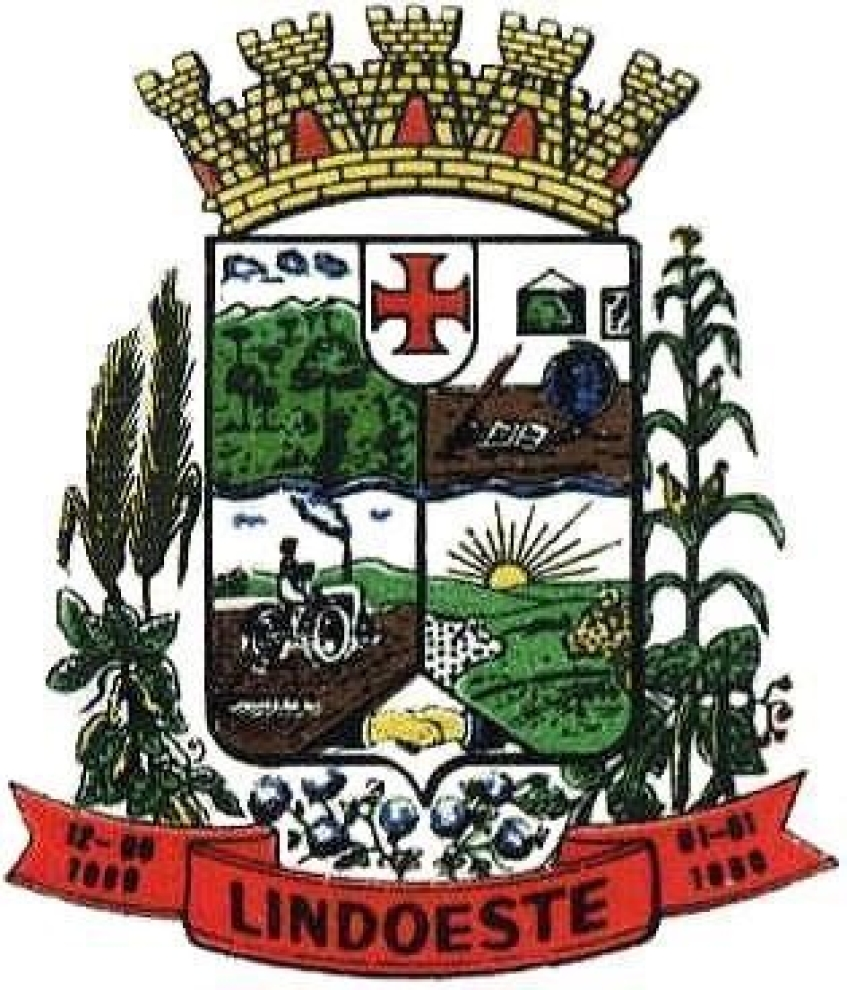
- Flag Coat of arms
- Interactive map of Lindoeste
- Country: Brazil
- Region: Southern
- State: Paraná
- Mesoregion: Oeste Paranaense

Population (2010)
  - Total: 5,361
- Time zone: UTC−3 (BRT)

Lindoeste is a municipality in the state of Paraná in the Southern Region of Brazil.

== See also ==
- List of municipalities in Paraná
