= Ariranha do Ivaí =

Coordinates: 24.3858°S 51.585°W

- Municipality
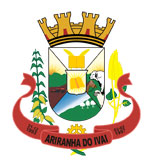
- Flag Coat of arms
- Interactive map of Ariranha do Ivaí
- Country: Brazil
- Region: Southern
- State: Paraná
- Mesoregion: Norte Central Paranaense

Population (2020)
  - Total: 2,066
- Time zone: UTC−3 (BRT)

Ariranha do Ivaí is a municipality in the state of Paraná in the Southern Region of Brazil.

== See also ==
- List of municipalities in Paraná
