= Mamborê =

Coordinates: 24°18′S 52°32′W

Mamborê, PR, Brazil Mamboreence
- Municipality
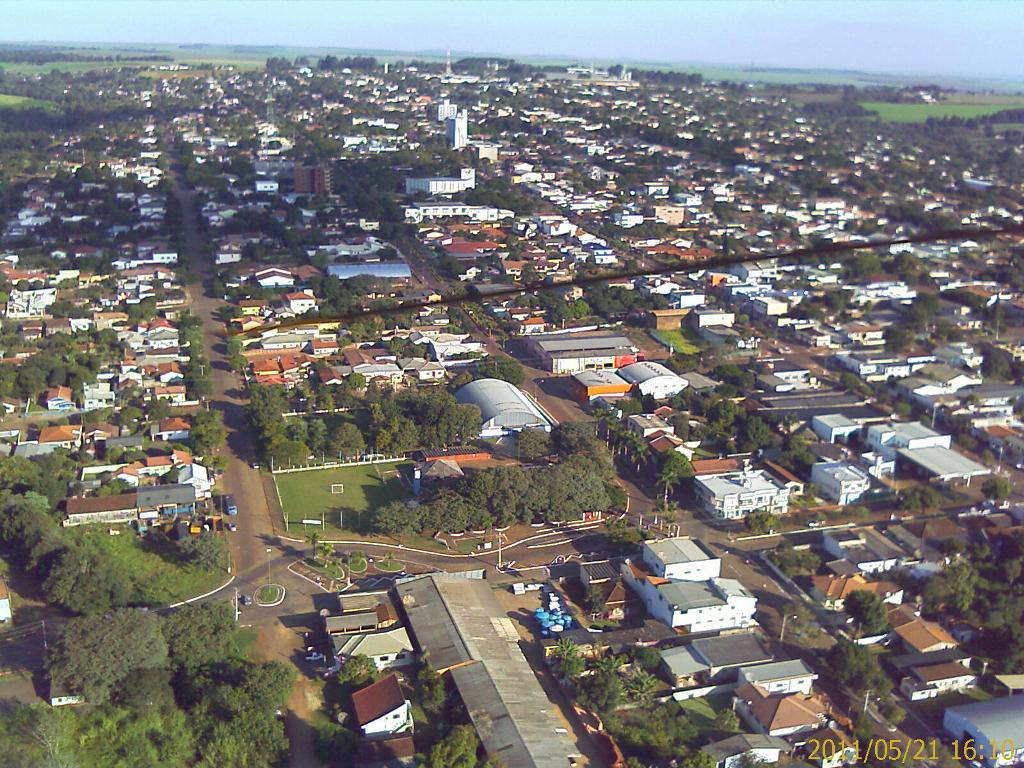

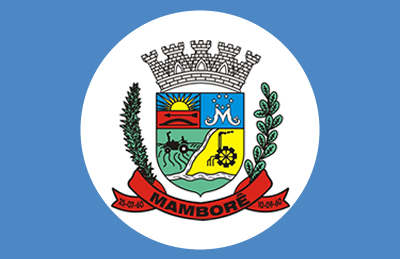
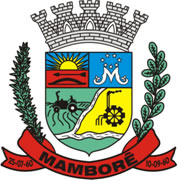
- Flag Coat of arms
- Interactive map of Mamborê, PR, Brazil
- Country: Brazil
- Region: Southern
- State: Paraná
- Mesoregion: Centro Ocidental Paranaense

Population (2020)
  - Total: 13,014
- Time zone: UTC−3 (BRT)

Mamborê is a municipality in the state of Paraná in the Southern Region of Brazil.

== See also ==
- List of municipalities in Paraná
