= Perobal =

Coordinates: 23°54′S 53°24′W

- Municipality
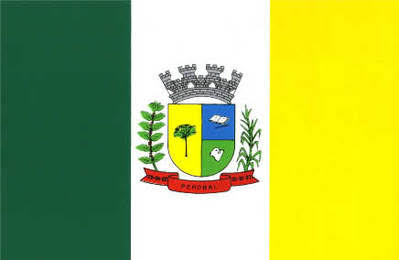
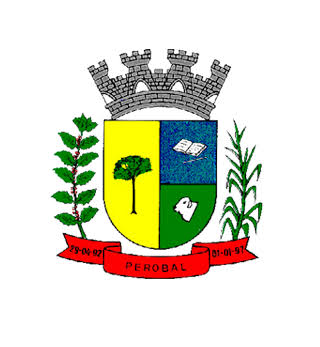
- Flag Coat of arms
- Interactive map of Perobal
- Country: Brazil
- Region: Southern
- State: Paraná
- Mesoregion: Noroeste Paranaense

Population (2020)
  - Total: 6,160
- Time zone: UTC−3 (BRT)

Perobal is a municipality in the state of Paraná in the Southern Region of Brazil.

== See also ==
- List of municipalities in Paraná
