= Mandirituba =

Coordinates: 25°47′S 49°20′W

- Municipality
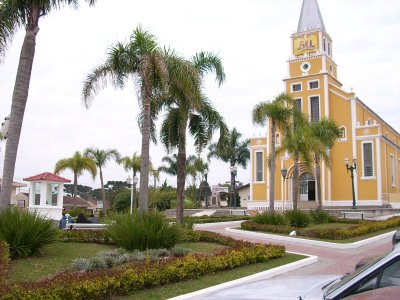

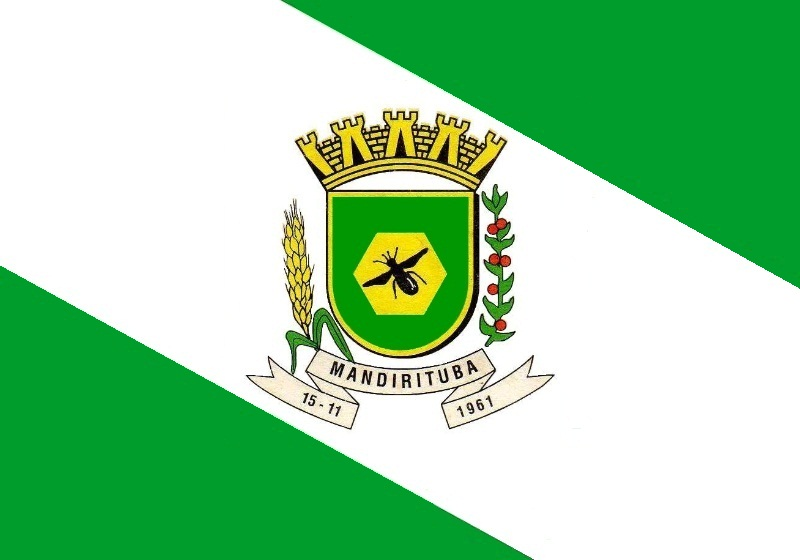
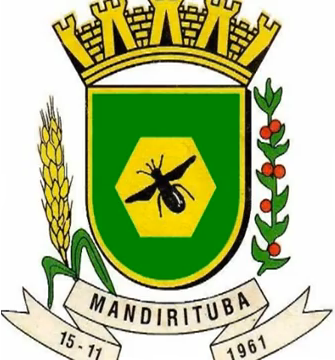
- Flag Coat of arms
- Interactive map of Mandirituba
- Country: Brazil
- Region: Southern
- State: Paraná
- Mesoregion: Metropolitana de Curitiba

Population (2020)
  - Total: 27,315
- Time zone: UTC−3 (BRT)

Mandirituba is a municipality in the state of Paraná in the Southern Region of Brazil.

Total population (2010): 22,235 inhabitants, Portuguese, Polish, Ukrainian, Italian and German descendants.

It is healthy country town of plantation by Curitiba district.

== See also ==
- List of municipalities in Paraná
