= Agudos do Sul =

Coordinates: 25°59′S 49°20′W

- Municipality
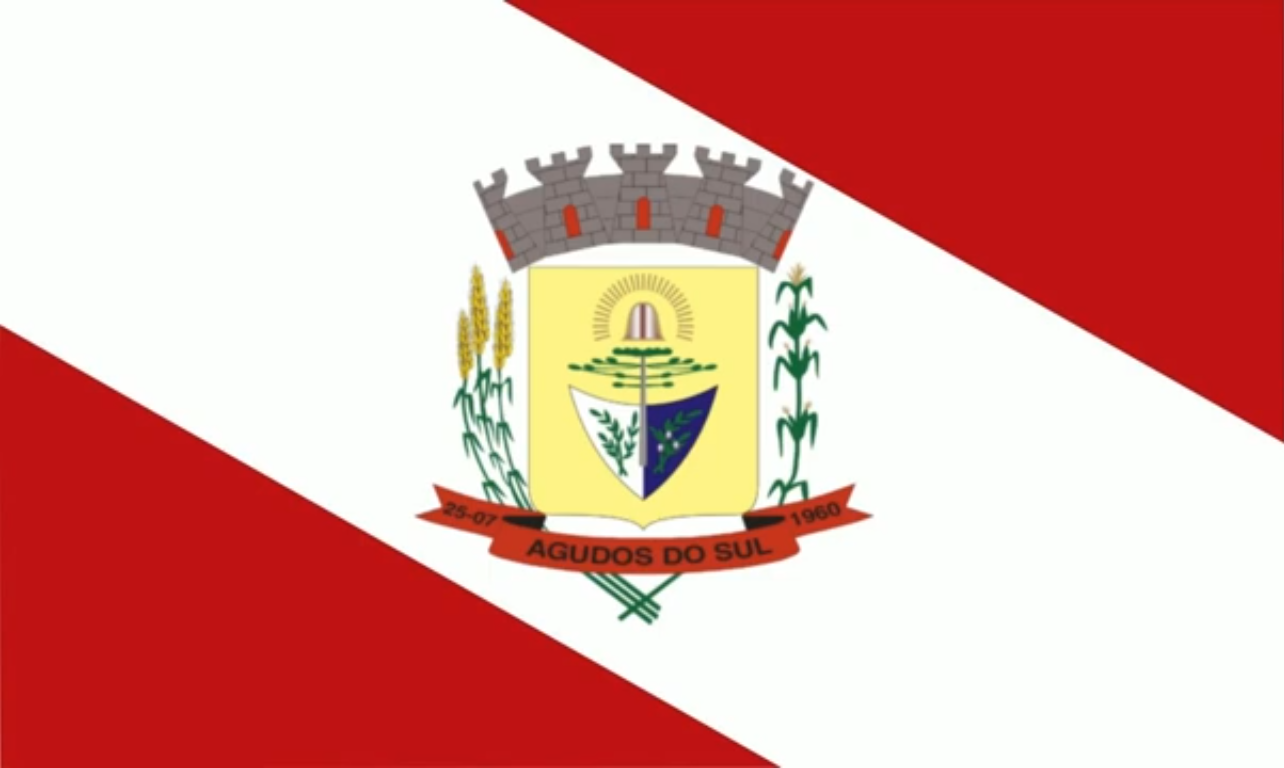
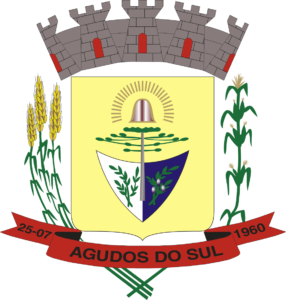
- Flag Coat of arms
- Interactive map of Agudos do Sul
- Country: Brazil
- Region: Southern
- State: Paraná
- Mesoregion: Metropolitana de Curitiba

Population (2020)
  - Total: 9,470
- Time zone: UTC−3 (BRT)

Agudos do Sul is a municipality in the state of Paraná in the Southern Region of Brazil.

As of 2020, IBGE reported Agudos do Sul had a population of 9,470.

== See also ==
- List of municipalities in Paraná
