= Mangueirinha =

- Municipality
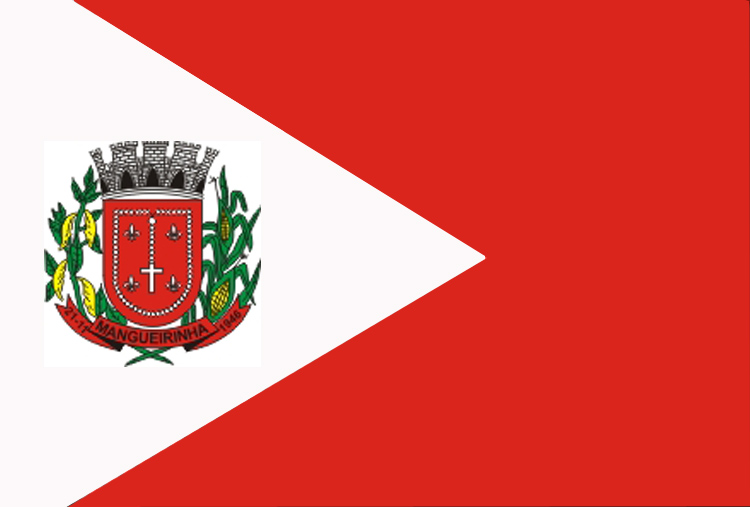
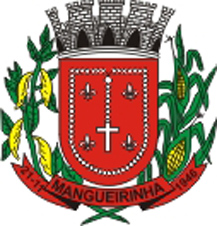
- Flag Coat of arms

- Location in Brazil
- Coordinates: 25°57′S 52°09′W
- Country: Brazil
- Region: Southern
- State: Paraná
- Mesoregion: Centro-Sul Paranaense

Area
  - Total: 414.594 sq mi (1,073.793 km^{2})

Population (2020)
  - Total: 16,642
  - Density: 43/sq mi (16.5/km^{2})
- Time zone: UTC−3 (BRT)

Mangueirinha is a municipality in the state of Paraná in the Southern Region of Brazil.

== See also ==
- List of municipalities in Paraná
