= Bela Vista da Caroba =

Coordinates: 25.8808°S 53.665°W

- Municipality
- Flag Coat of arms
- Interactive map of Bela Vista da Caroba
- Country: Brazil
- Region: Southern
- State: Paraná
- Mesoregion: Sudoeste Paranaense

Population (2020)
  - Total: 3,457
- Time zone: UTC−3 (BRT)

Bela Vista da Caroba is a municipality in the state of Paraná in the Southern Region of Brazil.

== See also ==
- List of municipalities in Paraná
