= Guapirama =

Coordinates: 23°31′S 50°03′W

- Municipality
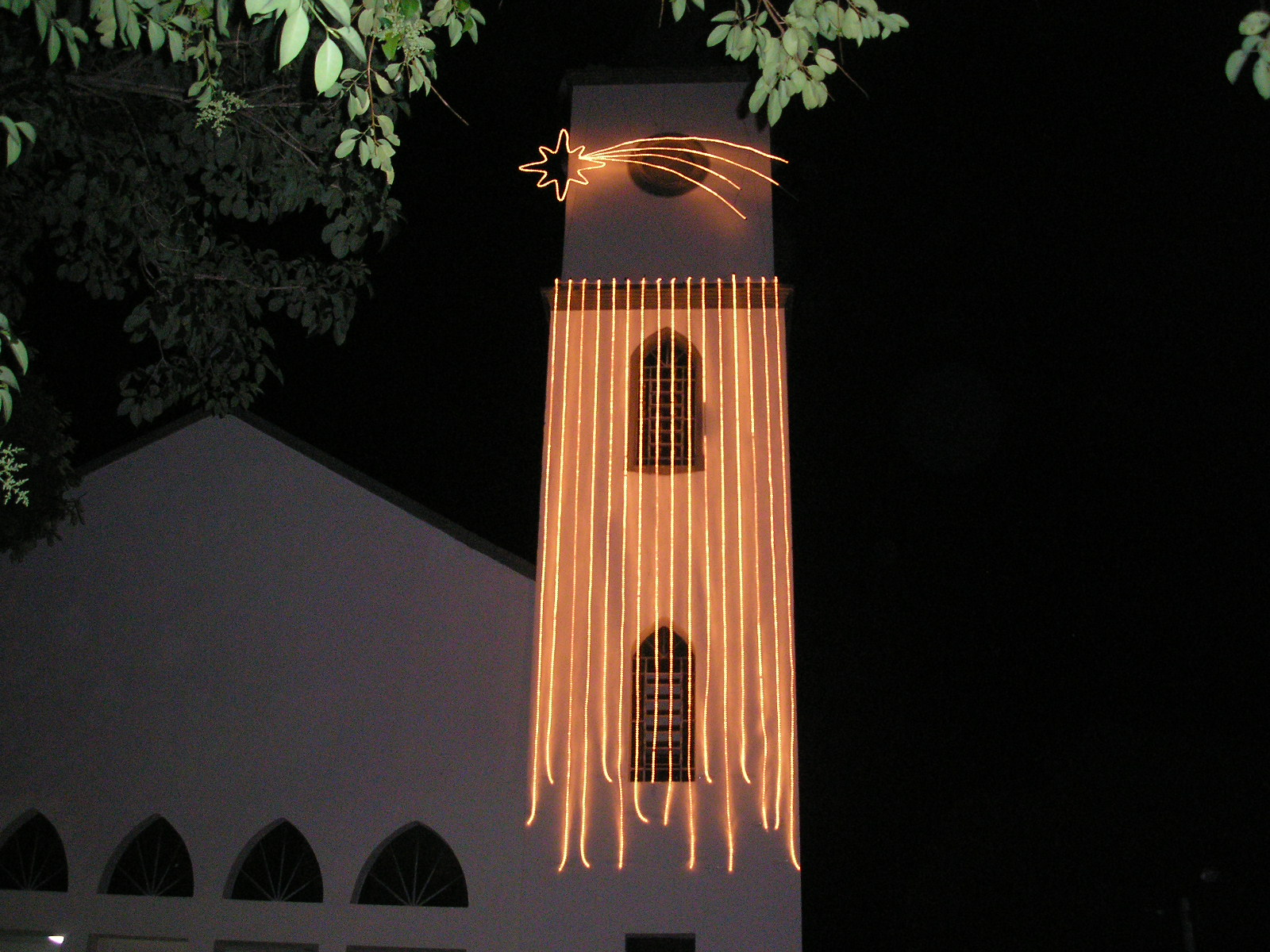
- Interactive map of Guapirama
- Country: Brazil
- Region: Southern
- State: Paraná
- Mesoregion: Norte Pioneiro Paranaense

Population (2020)
  - Total: 3,784
- Time zone: UTC−3 (BRT)

Guapirama is a municipality in the state of Paraná in the Southern Region of Brazil.

== See also ==
- List of municipalities in Paraná
