= Três Barras do Paraná =

Coordinates: 25.4189°S 53.1808°W

- Municipality
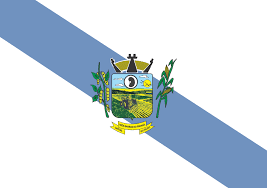
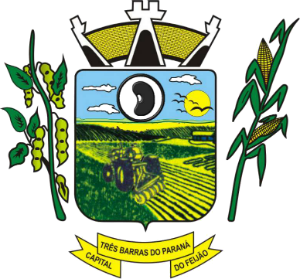
- Flag Coat of arms
- Interactive map of Três Barras do Paraná
- Country: Brazil
- Region: Southern
- State: Paraná
- Mesoregion: Oeste Paranaense

Population (2020)
  - Total: 12,038
- Time zone: UTC−3 (BRT)

Três Barras do Paraná is a municipality in the state of Paraná in the Southern Region of Brazil.

== See also ==
- List of municipalities in Paraná
