= Prado Ferreira =

Coordinates: 23.0389°S 51.4419°W

- Municipality
- Interactive map of Prado Ferreira
- Country: Brazil
- Region: Southern
- State: Paraná
- Mesoregion: Norte Central Paranaense

Population (2020)
  - Total: 3,780
- Time zone: UTC−3 (BRT)

Prado Ferreira is a municipality in the state of Paraná in the Southern Region of Brazil.
