= Mato Rico =

City of Mato Rico
- Location of Mato Rico
- Coordinates: 24°42′18″S 52°08′45″W
- Country: Brazil
- Region: South
- State: Paraná
- Founded: 1993

Government
  - Mayor: Nilson Padilha (PMDB)

Area
  - Total: 394.533 km^{2} (152.330 sq mi)
- Elevation: 700 m (2,300 ft)

Population (2020)
  - Total: 3,206
  - Density: 8.3/km^{2} (21/sq mi)
- Time zone: UTC−3 (BRT)
- HDI (2000): 0.640 – medium

Mato Rico is a Brazilian municipality in the state of Paraná.

== History ==
In 1940, the lands of the region that is now the city of Mato Rico started to be occupied. These were provided by the state government, and acquired by people who migrated to the region looking for low-cost land for subsistence farming.

The settlement grew up and developed from the next year on, when the inhabitants started to settle near the road that served the city. The first school and the first cemetery were built in 1942 and in 1945, respectively. People of Polish, Ukrainian, Italian, Portuguese, Indigenous and African descent also migrated to the city. On January 31, 1991, the city became independent from Pitanga.

== Geography ==
The municipality has an area of 394,533 m^{2}, representing 0.1979% of the state, 0.07% of the region and 0.0046% of all the Brazilian territory. The altitude if of 700 m. According to the Köppen climate classification, the climate is type Cfb. The annual average temperature is 20 °C. The maximum temperature is 22 °C in the summer and the minimum is 18 °C in the winter. Normally, it may rain between 1,700 and 1,900 mm every year.

== Economy ==
The city's economy largely relies on agriculture. There are many small properties, most of them measuring 22.4 ha, and most of them using low or medium technology. The main products are: corn, cattle, bean, rice, cotton, soy. Some emerging activities include beekeeping and sericulture.
