= Metropolitan Region of Maringá =

Metropolitan Region of Maringa on a map

The Metropolitan Region of Maringá, established by Complementary State Law 83/1998, consists of the municipalities of Maringá, Sarandi, Marialva, Mandaguari, Paiçandu, Ângulo, Iguaraçu, Mandaguaçu, Floresta, Doutor Camargo, Itambé, Bahia, Astorga, Ivatuba, Bom Sucesso, Jandaia do Sul, Cambira, Presidente Castelo Branco, Flórida, Santa Fé, Lobato, Munhoz de Mello, Floraí, Atalaia, São Jorge do Ivaí, Ourizona and Nova Esperança. Comprising 26 municipalities, it covers an area of 5,978.592 km² and has an estimated population of around 851,000 inhabitants (IBGE/2022).

The last modification occurred in 2012 through Complementary State Law 145, which added the municipality of Nova Esperança. The region may still expand with the inclusion of 8 more municipalities (Marumbi, Santo Inácio, Colorado, Paranacity, Engenheiro Beltrão, Fênix, Barbosa Ferraz and Quinta do Sol) through an amendment to Complementary Law Project No. 6/2013, expanding to a total of 34 municipalities.

== History ==
=== Complementary State Law 83/1998 ===
Established the Metropolitan Region of Maringá, initially consisting of 8 municipalities: Maringá, Sarandi, Paiçandu, Mandaguaçu, Marialva, Mandaguari, Ângulo and Iguaraçu. The law was signed by the president of the Court of Justice of Paraná and also acting Governor Des. Henrique Chesneau Lenz César.

=== Law No. 13565/2002 ===
Amends Complementary State Law 83/1998. Adds the municipality of Floresta to the Metropolitan Region of Maringá. Signed by the president of ALEP, Hermas Brandão.

=== Complementary State Law 110/2005 ===
Amends Complementary State Law 83/1998. Adds 4 municipalities to the Metropolitan Region of Maringá: Doutor Camargo, Itambé, Astorga and Ivatuba. Signed by the president of ALEP, Hermas Brandão.

=== Complementary State Law 127/2010 ===
Amends Complementary State Law 83/1998. Adds 12 municipalities to the Metropolitan Region of Maringá: Bom Sucesso, Jandaia do Sul, Cambira, Presidente Castelo Branco, Flórida, Santa Fé, Lobato, Munhoz de Mello, Floraí, Atalaia, São Jorge do Ivaí and Ourizona. Signed during the government of Roberto Requião.

=== Complementary State Law 145/2012 ===
Amends Complementary State Law 83/1998. Adds the municipality of Nova Esperança to the Metropolitan Region of Maringá. Signed during the government of Beto Richa.

== Municipalities ==
Municipality	Area (km²)	Population (2018)	GDP in BRL (2021)	Distance to Maringá (km)
Ângulo	106.021	2,927	154,209,068	36.6
Astorga	434.791	26,011	882,969,447	52
Atalaia	137.663	3,902	177,317,135	53.6
Bom Sucesso	322.755	6,995	157,282,948	61.8
Cambira	162.635	7,813	280,229,165	54.2
Doutor Camargo	118.278	5,976	200,380,398	37.7
Floraí	191.133	4,953	239,271,417	47.7
Floresta	158.225	6,695	271,142,618	28.7
Flórida	83.046	2,679	80,584,485	50.4
Iguaraçu	164.983	4,366	212,523,906	30.9
Itambé	243.821	6,107	228,348,997	46.1
Ivatuba	96.786	3,238	143,603,933	43.2
Jandaia do Sul	187.600	21,122	790,200,148	42
Lobato	240.904	4,755	215,578,882	59.7
Mandaguari	335.814	34,281	1,835,781,578	30.1
Mandaguaçu	294.010	21,672	687,776,096	20.8
Marialva	475.467	35,180	2,654,519,884	17.2
Maringá	487.930	417,010	22,656,732,553	-
Munhoz de Melo	137.018	3,958	136,941,311	45.9
Nova Esperança	401.587	27,821	943,234,906	43.5
Ourizona	176.457	3,430	166,706,762	41.1
Paiçandu	171.379	40,777	1,057,772,146	13.8
Presidente Castelo Branco	155.734	5,260	147,412,650	32.2
Santa Fé	276.241	11,885	319,694,397	51.3
Sarandi	103.226	95,543	2,072,896,508	8.3
São Jorge do Ivaí	315.088	5,559	401,331,316	53.9
Total	5,978.592	809.915	37,114,442,654	
