= List of futsal clubs in Brazil =

This is a list of futsal clubs in Brazil.

Club	City	State
Associação Cascavelense de Futsal	Cascavel	Paraná
ADC	Florianópolis	Santa Catarina
AEC - Associação Esportiva de Clevelândia	Clevelândia	Paraná
Álvares Futsal	Vitória	Espírito Santo
Aquarius Futsal	Telêmaco Borba	Paraná
Arapongas	Arapongas	Paraná
Araucária	Araucária	Paraná
Atlântico	Erechim	Rio Grande do Sul
Banespa	São Bernardo do Campo	São Paulo
Campo Mourão Futsal	Campo Mourão	Paraná
Canoas	Canoas	Rio Grande do Sul
Carlos Barbosa	Carlos Barbosa	Rio Grande do Sul
Cascavel	Cascavel	Paraná
Castro Futsal	Castro	Paraná
Colégio Londrinense	Londrina	Paraná
Copagril Futsal	Marechal Cândido Rondon	Paraná
Coritiba (SE)	Itabaiana	Sergipe
Cortiana/UCS	Caxias do Sul	Rio Grande do Sul
Ciagym	Maringá	Paraná
Foz do Iguaçu ADEAFI	Foz do Iguaçu	Paraná
Francisco Beltrão	Francisco Beltrão	Paraná
Guaraniaçu Futsal	Guaraniaçu	Paraná
Guarapuava Futsal	Guarapuava	Paraná
Intelli	Orlândia	São Paulo
Ivaiporã Futsal	Ivaiporã	Paraná
John Deere	Horizontina	Rio Grande do Sul
Joinville/Krona	Joinville	Santa Catarina
Laranjeiras do Sul Futsal	Laranjeiras do Sul	Paraná
Macaé/DalPonte	Macaé	Rio de Janeiro
Malwee/Jaraguá	Jaraguá do Sul	Santa Catarina
Mandaguaçu Futsal	Mandaguaçu	Paraná
Marialva Futsal	Marialva	Paraná
Medianeira Futsal	Medianeira	Paraná
Palotina Futsal	Palotina	Paraná
Paraná Clube	Curitiba	Paraná
Pato Branco	Pato Branco	Paraná
Pé no Chão	Chapada	Rio Grande do Sul
Petrópolis	Petrópolis	Rio de Janeiro
Ponta Grossa	Ponta Grossa	Paraná
Quedas do Iguaçu Futsal	Quedas do Iguaçu	Paraná
RCG/SP	Garça	São Paulo
Renascença Marreco Futsal	Renascença	Paraná
Rio Branco Paranaguá	Paranaguá	Paraná
Santa Fé	Santa Fé do Sul	São Paulo
Santos	Santos	São Paulo
São Caetano	São Caetano do Sul	São Paulo
São Lucas	Paranavaí	Paraná
São Miguel	São Miguel do Iguaçu	Paraná
Sorocaba Futsal	Sorocaba	São Paulo
Sumov	Fortaleza	Ceará
Teixeira Soares Futsal	Teixeira Soares	Paraná
Teresópolis/DalPonte	Teresópolis	Rio de Janeiro
Tio Sam	Niterói	Rio de Janeiro
Umuarama	Umuarama	Paraná
Unisul	Joinville	Santa Catarina
V&M Minas	Belo Horizonte	Minas Gerais

== See also ==
- Futsal in Brazil
