= Viticulture in Paraná =

Economic and agricultural activity for grape and wine production in Paraná

Viticulture in Paraná is an agricultural economic activity that aims at the production of grapes and their destination for the manufacture of wines and beverages in the state of Paraná, Brazil.

Paraná ranks fourth in national grape production followed by Bahia and Santa Catarina, behind only Rio Grande do Sul, São Paulo, and Pernambuco. The state produces mainly varieties of fine grapes, commercial grapes, and, to a lesser extent, rustic grapes. The cultivation of European Vitis vinifera varieties for the production of fine wines is also expanding.

== Introduction ==
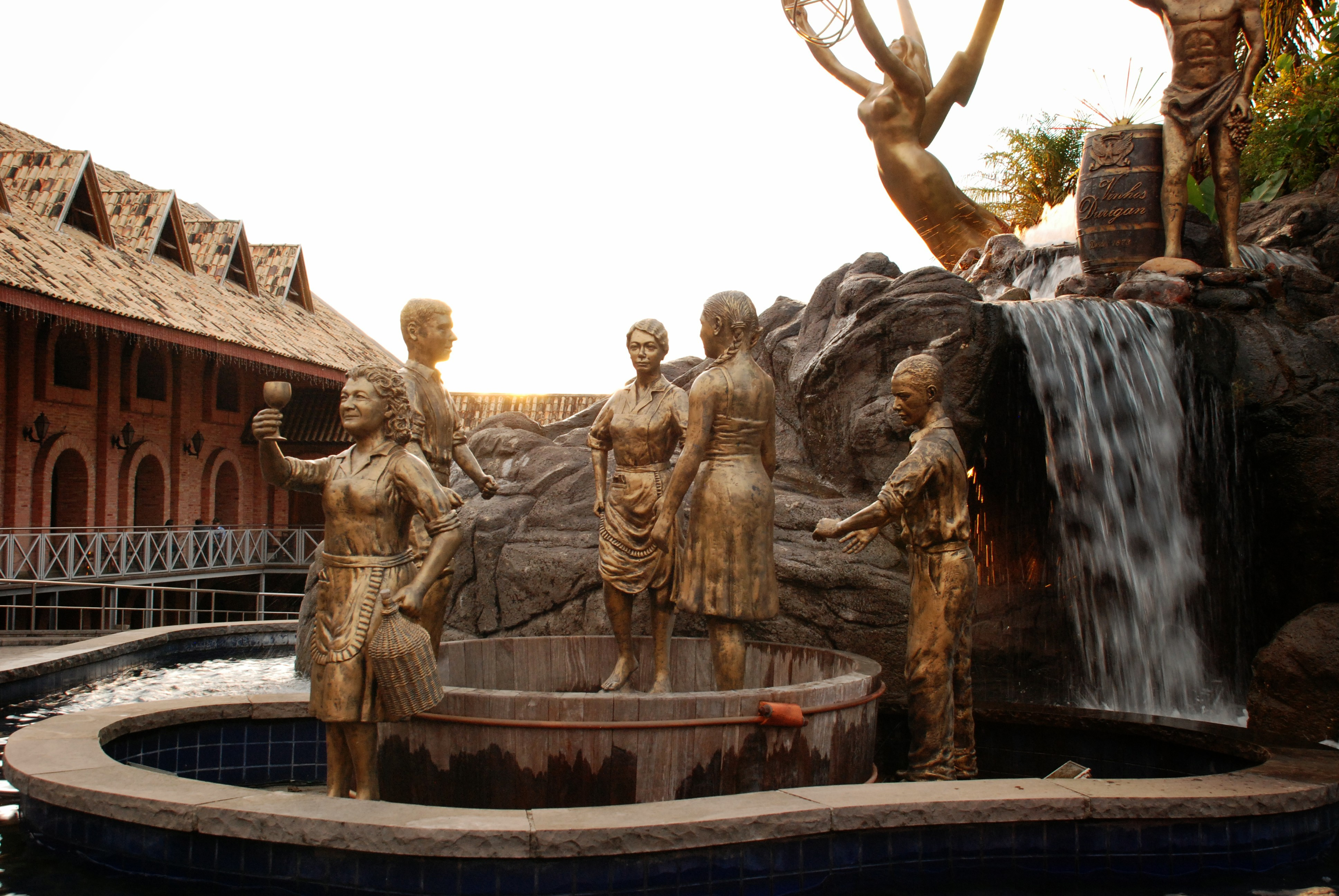
Monument in honor of the wine in Curitiba.

The average productivity of Paraná is 17.5 tons of grapes per hectare, according to the Brazilian Institute of Geography and Statistics (Instituto Brasileiro de Geografia e Estatística - IBGE). In 2010, Paraná had 5.9 thousand hectares, harvesting approximately 100 thousand tons per year. Present in almost the entire state, the regions that stand out in grape production are the northwest and north, especially the city of Marialva, 18 kilometers from Maringá, responsible for just over 22% of state production in 2021.

The west and southwest have great importance, however, in an activity focused more on wine production. The Greater Curitiba (Região Metropolitana de Curitiba - RMC) also has a good production, especially Colombo, Campo Largo, and São José dos Pinhais. Except for the coast, in all the other regions there is viticulture. Among the grapes with greater presence in the state are the varieties Itália, Rubi, Benitaka and Brasil. Among the rustic grapes, the most produced are pink and white Niagara and Tercy (Ives Noir).

== History ==
=== Early times ===
Viticulture in the state of Paraná dates back to early colonisation periods, starting in 1557 with the foundation of Ciudad Real del Guayrá by the Spanish Jesuits, with grapes coming from Buenos Aires. This phase ended with the destruction of the missions by the bandeirantes.

=== 19th century ===
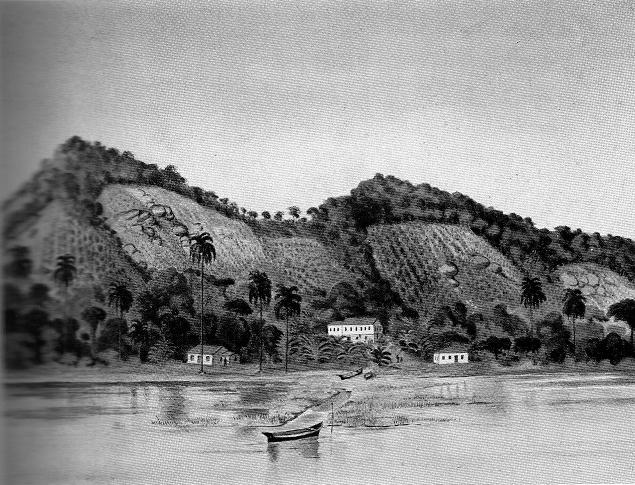
Vineyards on Barbados Hill, Colonia del Superaguy, 19th century.

In 1852 with the creation of the Colony of Superagui, the settlers coming mainly from Switzerland (Vevey) and France (Alsace), but also Germans and Italians, brought grapes and obtained a certain success supplying wine to Curitiba and Santos, being compared at that time, in terms of quality, to the European wine. By the end of the 1870s the Colony had 6 cantinas. In the letters transcribed by Marjolaine Guisan and Françoise Lambert, historians of the historical museum of Vevey, they report about one of its most illustrious residents, the painter William Michaud:

[...] taking special care with grape culture, which gave him good harvests on the slopes of Barbados hill, which made him together with his neighbor Alsatian Sigwalt, dedicate himself to viniculture, arriving to have 1,000 vines, producing the wine called "petit Bordeaux", comparable to the Swiss, as stated in the official report to the Assembly, March 31, 1877: "the wine that is produced in the colony (of Superagui) has had good acceptance in this capital."

From the middle of the 19th century on, new immigrants begin to arrive in Paraná. In Colombo, in the second year in their new homeland, the settlers, by means of a petition, asked the government to provide vineyards for cultivation, because the land was suitable. The request was granted, and the settlers received five crates of vine shoots. In a short time all the Italian settlers in the municipality had their vineyards and were producing wine for their own consumption and traditional festivals. There was also a large and well ventilated cantina built next to the settlers' house, where at the time of wine production they used to process the grapes.

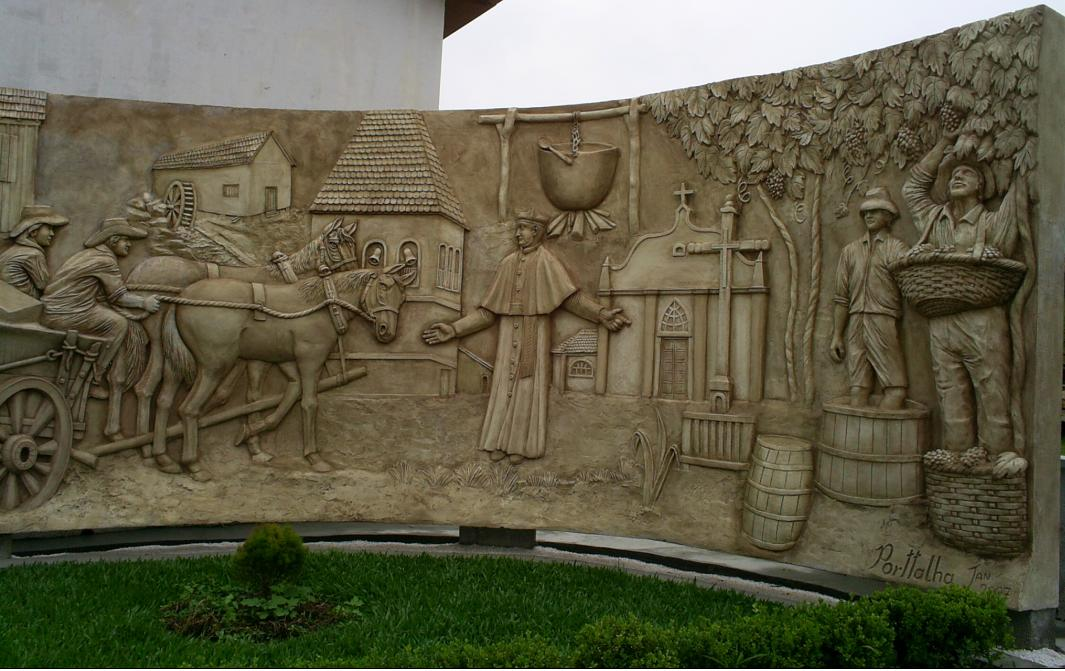
Historical monument commemorating Italian emigration, Antônio Rebouças Colony, Curitiba.

A great attempt to grow grapes in Paraná took place between the years 1868 and 1869, by French settlers, to the outskirts of Curitiba, but the attempt was not successful, because they tried to make French-like viticulture. This phase of implementation had its apogee at the end of this century in Curitiba, when European grapes were produced in a protected environment - glass greenhouses - with emphasis on the cultivars Alphonse Lavallé, Ugni Blanc and Hamburg Muscat.

=== 20th century ===
==== First half ====
The expansion phase of vine culture in the state took place in the mid-nineteenth century with varieties of rustic grapes (American) brought from the state of São Paulo, and fixed in the surroundings of Curitiba, being predominant the cultivars Bordeaux or Terci, the Goethe, Concord, Isabel among others.

However, the great insertion and fixation of the culture occurred with the cultivars Isabel and Terci (or Bordeaux, Ives) by Italian settlers, in the surroundings of Curitiba and in the border municipalities with the state of Santa Catarina. More recently, around 1940, a new area of highly technological viticulture was established in the northern region of Paraná.

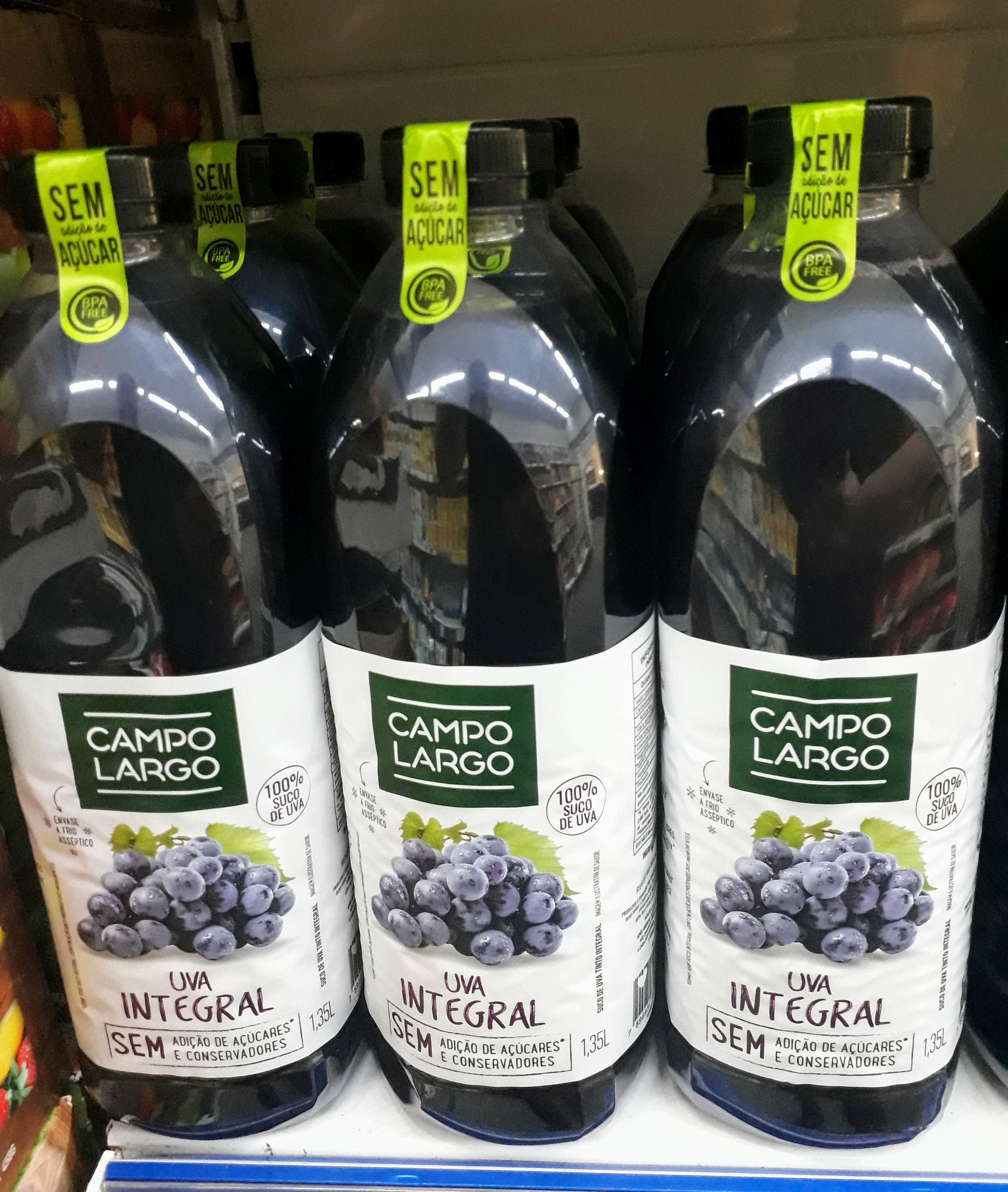
Traditional integral grape juice from Paraná.

The introduction of grape growing in the Norte Pioneiro region came through the hands of Japanese farmers who had settled in the region to grow coffee. The prosperity came from the pioneering of Toshikatsu Wakita who, in the 60's, brought the fine grape to the region, the current base of the economy. Despite the good results obtained by the first settlers, the culture initially had its cultivation almost restricted to the members of the Japanese colony. In 1975, with the advent of the great frost that decimated the coffee plantations in the region, viticulture proved to be a viable option for small producers in the municipality, who expanded its cultivation in the region.

With the occupation of the Southwest region by Italian and German descendants coming from other regions of Paraná, Santa Catarina, and Rio Grande do Sul, there was a great expansion and development of viticulture in the region. Today it has a well organized and structured sector in several cities.

==== Second half ====
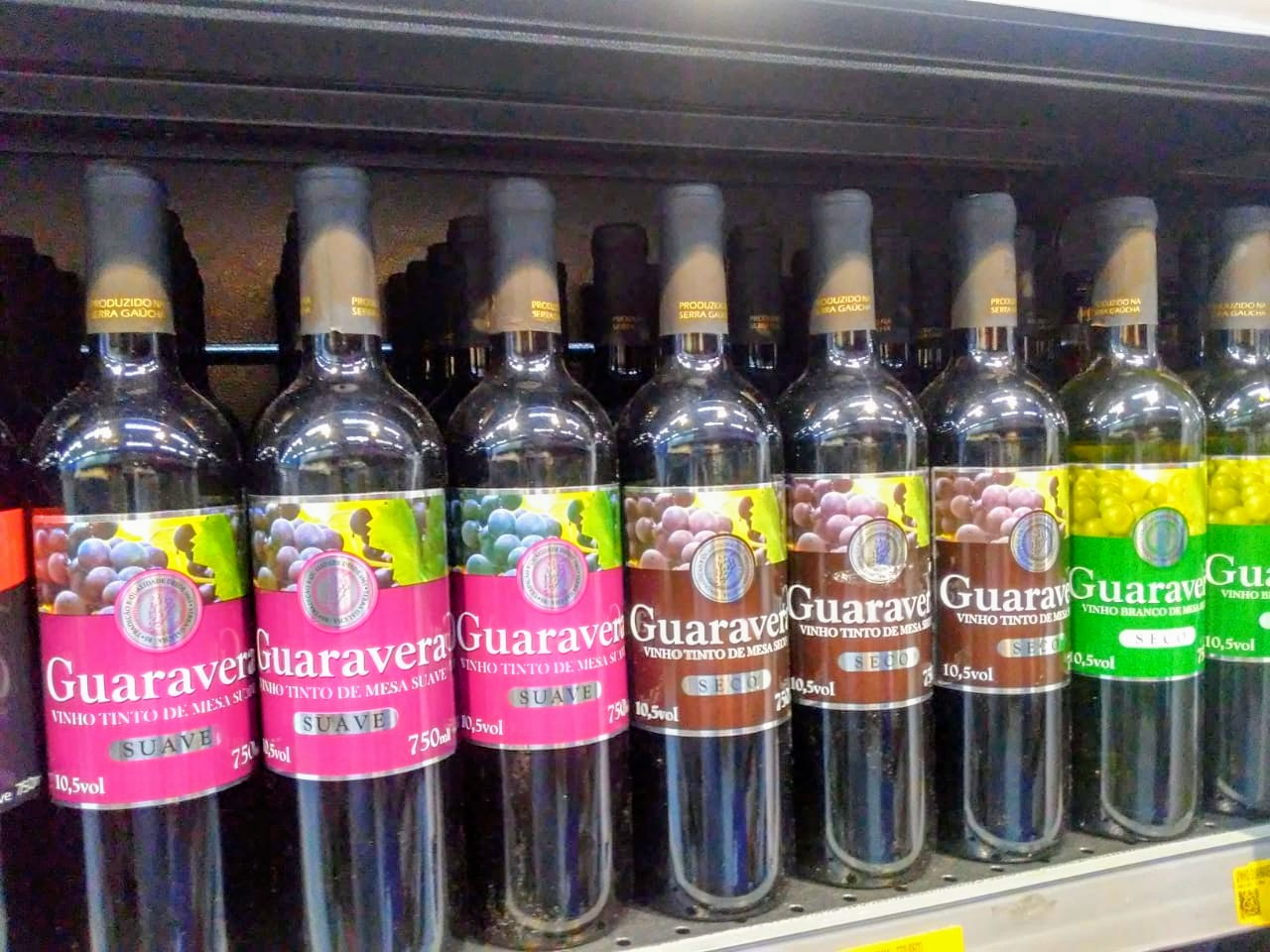
Example of wines produced in Londrina.

Until the 1960s, viticulture was considered an activity of great economic importance throughout the state, also strongly associated with socio-cultural traditions. Besides the cantinas for self consumption, already at the beginning of the century, large wineries were established, such as Vinhos Paraná, Colombo, Guarise, Vinícola Campo Largo, Vinhos Durigan, and Santa Felicidade. This market would remain advantageous until the mid-1960s, when the grape and wine crisis emerges.

The early 1960s were marked by the decline of viticulture. Several factors contributed to the decline of production:

- The valorization of the real estate market in the metropolitan region of Curitiba made land too expensive for viticulture;
- The closing of research institutes such as the Campo Largo Oenology Sub-Station leaving the sector lacking in technology and vulnerable to diseases such as "pérola" (Rizococus brasiliensis);
- Fall in productivity due to this disease when not the total loss of many vineyards;
- The fall in the price of wine, associated with the loss of competitiveness for wine from Rio Grande do Sul;
- The decrease in wine consumption due to the competitiveness of other beverages such as beer;
- The growth in demand for vegetables showing prospects for higher yields, especially with the replacement of grapevines by chayote planting, which allowed the use of existing support structures, and organizational problems in the local cooperative of grape and wine producers.

Together, these factors led to the reduction in grape-growing areas by a large amount. In many cases, this meant the option to specialize in vegetable production. In others it meant a crisis situation.

==== Native varieties ====
Ruby grape.

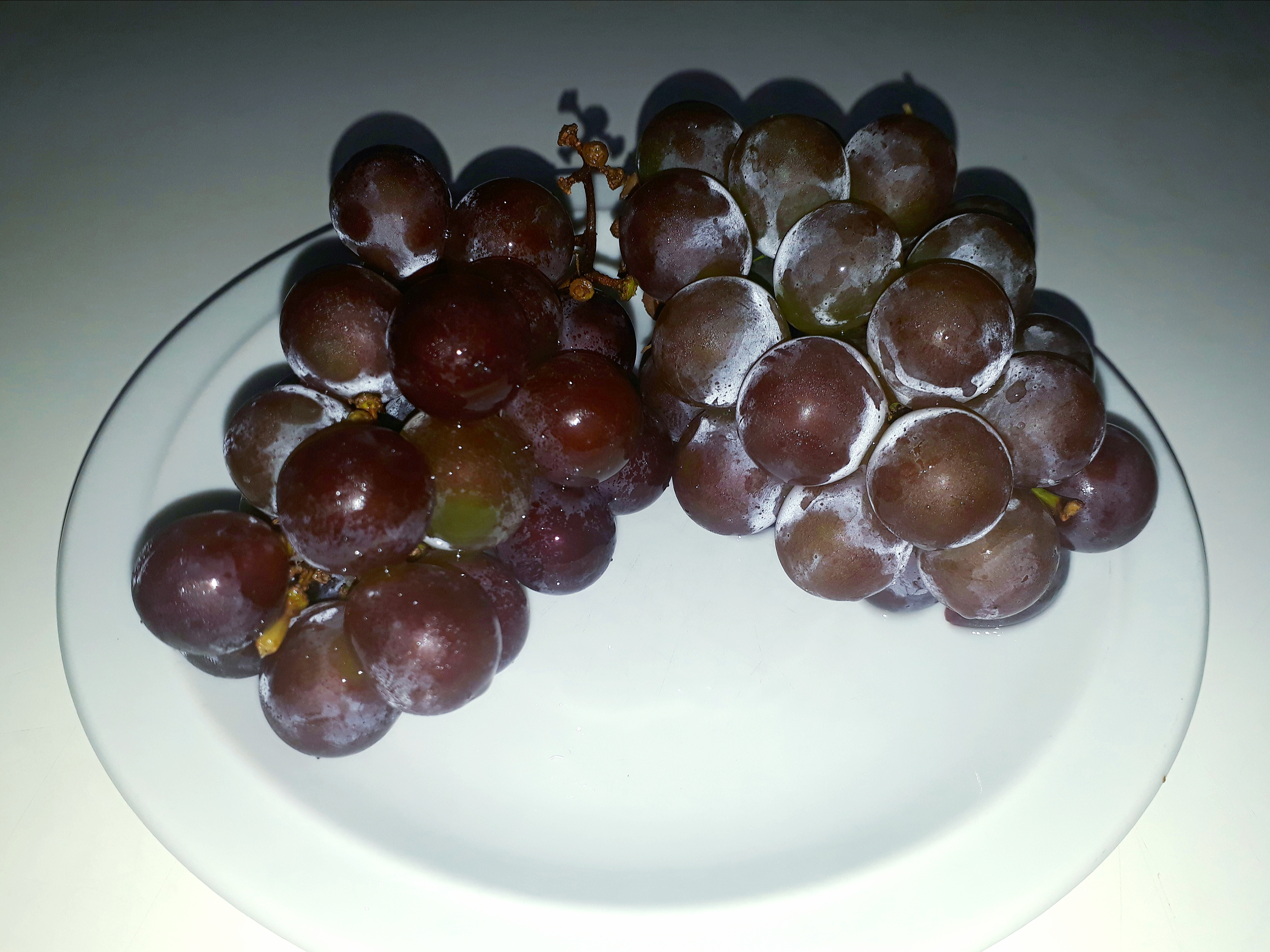
Niagara Rosada grapes, commercialized in Campo Largo.

Rubi, Benitaka, Brasil. These three varieties of grapes are already known throughout the country and even abroad, thanks to the watchful eye and patience of two farmers from northern Paraná. In 1973, the fruit grower Kotaro Okuyama, rural owner in the city of Santa Mariana, during an operation to remove spoiled berries, discovered a cluster with 10 to 12 reddish berries. Mr. Hashima, an agricultural engineer, soon verified that it was a somatic mutation. At the same time, Okuyama observed almost daily what was happening to the cluster. After four years of observation, he took care of multiplication, leaving the original branch, but taking advantage of the branch that kept the same characteristics. Today the ruby grape is planted in almost all the producing regions of the country and even abroad. There are cultivations in Europe and Japan.

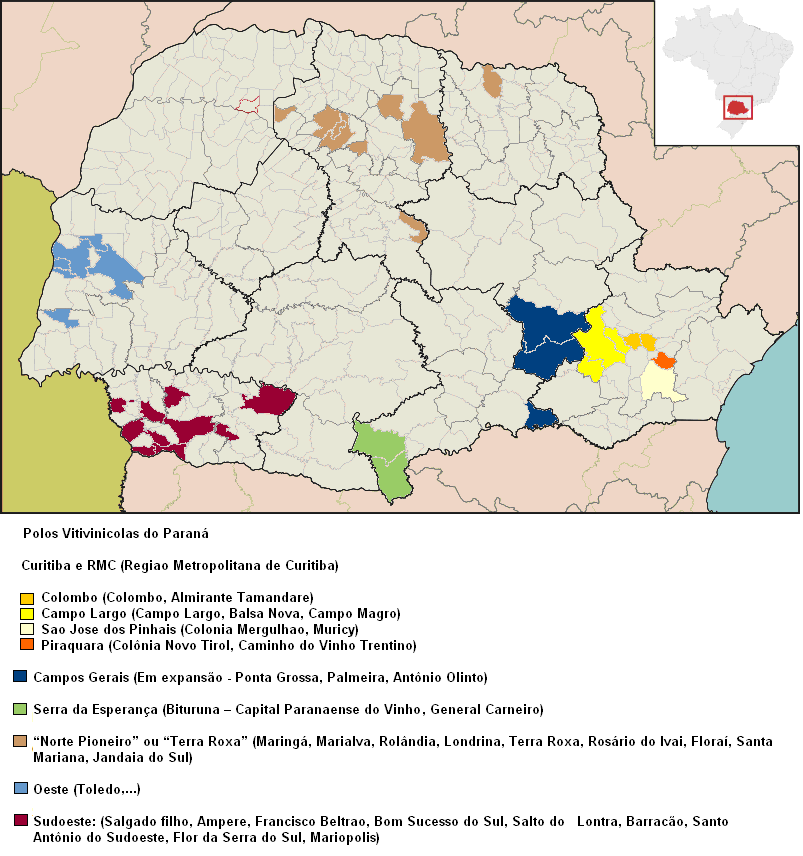
Vitiviniculture poles of the state of Paraná.

In 1989, 200 km from Santa Mariana, in the city of Floraí, a similar case occurred with the producer Mr. Sadao. The new variety was baptized with the name Benitaka, which in Japanese means strong red. Even before Benitaka spread to the four corners of the country, the vines of the new variety gave Mr. Sadao another surprise. Three years after the Benitaka, a new genetic mutation appeared on the property, which gave rise to a very dark colored grape that he named Brasil grape.

==== Main producing regions ====
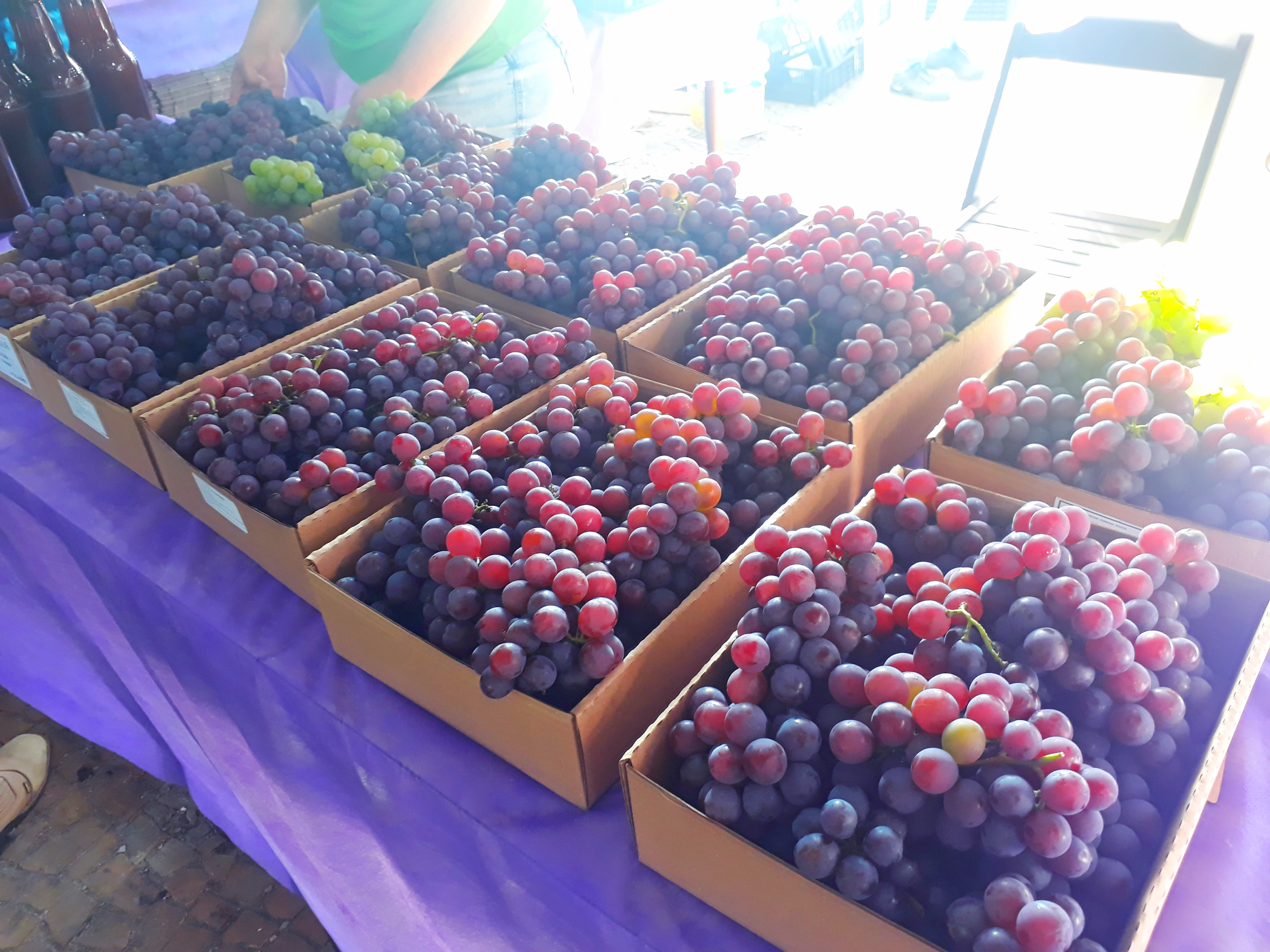
Examples of grape varieties on display in Ponta Grossa.

Paraná is a state marked by the pulverized production of grapes and wine. In the northwest and north of the state, the municipalities of Marialva (responsible for a little over 22% of the state production of fine grapes), and also Rolandia, Maringá, and Londrina stand out. The main varieties grown in this region are Italia, Rubi, Benitaka and Brasil. Further south in this region the town of Rosário do Ivaí stands out, capital of Paraná of the Niagara grape, with about 150 ha of grapes.

In the First Plateau of Paraná, or "Curitiba's Fields" as it is better known, it is traditional for the production of table wines, especially wines based on Terci (Bordeaux) grapes. These wines are commercialized in wineries located in good structures and well frequented, thanks to the existence of tourist routes, such as the Italian Rural Tourism Circuit (Circuito Italiano de Turismo Rural) and the Wine Paths (Caminhos do Vinho), in the cities of Colombo and São José dos Pinhais. In Curitiba, in the neighborhood of Santa Felicidade, and in Campo Largo, some of the largest wineries in the country are concentrated. At the same latitude, west of Curitiba, the Campos Gerais municipalities stand out, such as Ponta Grossa, Palmeira, Antônio Olinto, Rebouças, and currently, Guarapuava. Besides these, the southwestern and western regions stand out, especially Toledo, and the Norte Pioneiro region. Further south, the grapevine cultivation occurs in mosaics in the cities of Rio Negro, Mallet, União da Vitória, Bituruna, and General Carneiro.

==== Current times and future perspectives ====
Recently the state has had a prosperous phase mainly with the improvement of rootstocks resistant to "pérola-da-terra", Eurhizococcus brasiliensis (Hempel) soil cochineal, and the development of new varieties by Paraná Rural Development Institute (Instituto de Desenvolvimento Rural do Paraná - IAPAR) that have improved the resistance of the grapevine. The exemption of the Tax on Goods and Services Circulation (Imposto sobre Circulação de Mercadorias e Serviços - ICMS) in 2007 in the state encouraged companies, producers, government entities, research, and municipalities to reorganize. One of the most important steps was also the creation of the Grape and Wine School (Escola da Uva e do Vinho) together with Embrapa Florestas in Colombo, giving technical training for wine, juice and other grape derivatives such as vinegar and grappa productions. In 2020, Paraná produced 60,000 tons of grapes, which represented 3.6% of the national production and 1% of the wine made in Brazil. The state has 28 major wineries.

== See also ==
- Brazilian wine
- Embrapa
- Viticulture
- IBGE

== Bibliography ==
- Botton, Marcos et al.. (2011). Pérola-da-terra - Eurhizococcus brasiliensis (Hempel) (Hemiptera: Margarodidae) na cultura da videira (in Portuguese). Embrapa.
- Carvalho, S.L.C. et al.. (2007) Viticultura tropical: o sistema de produção no Paraná (in Portuguese) Londrina: IAPAR.
- Hidalgo Fernández, Luis (2002). Tratado de viticultura general (in Spanish). Barcelona: Mundi Prensa.
- Scherer, Emílio; Michaud (1979). O pintor de Superaguí (in Portuguese). Fundação Cultural de Curitiba.
- Monteiro, Senador Tobias de (1903). Do Rio ao Paraná (in Portuguese). Rio de Janeiro.
