= Furka, North Macedonia =

Furka Фурка
- Village
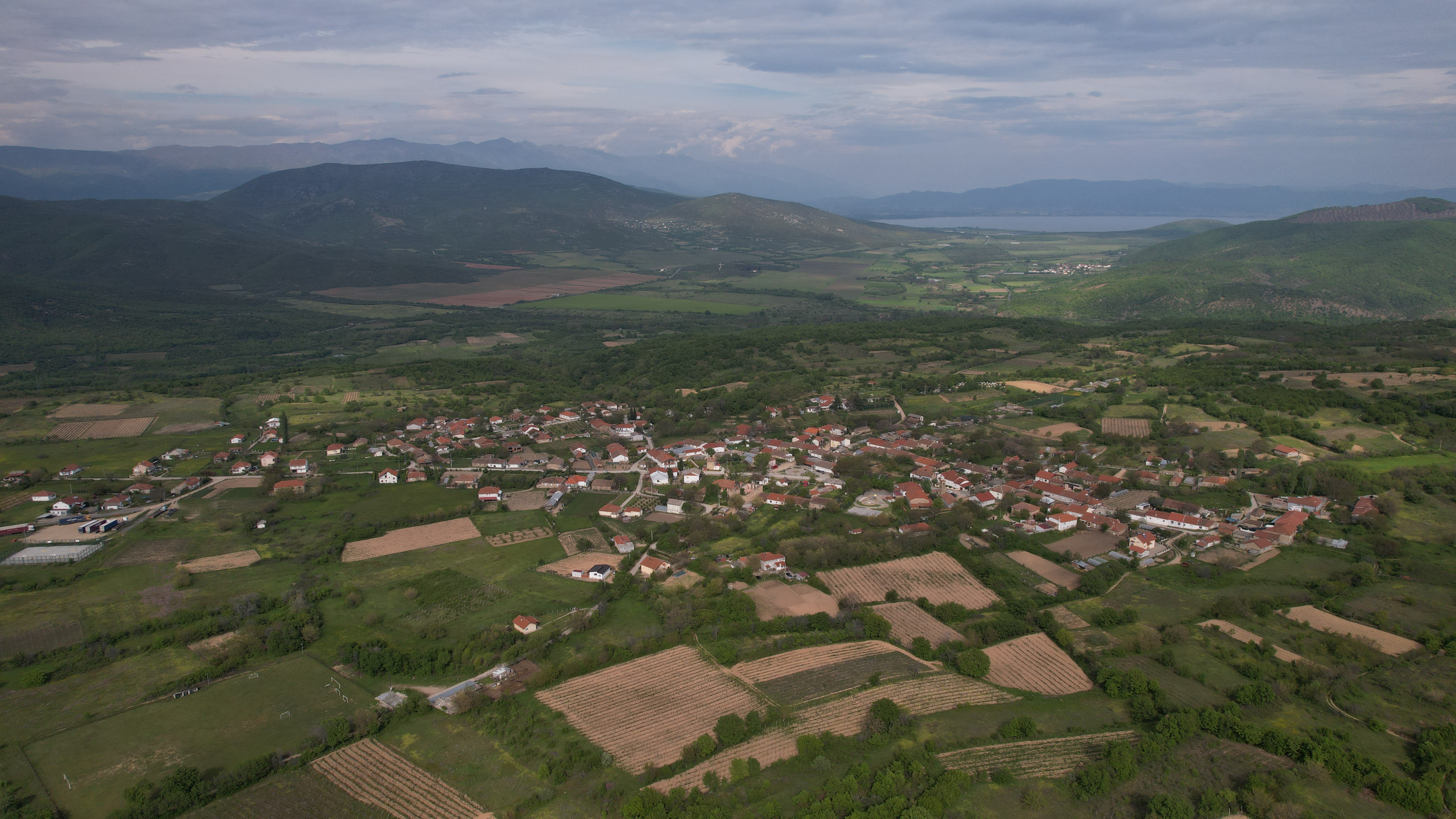
- Air view of the village Furka

- Location within North Macedonia
- Country: North Macedonia
- Region: Southeastern
- Municipality: Dojran
- Elevation: 350 m (1,150 ft)

Population (2021)
  - Total: 459
- Time zone: UTC+1 (CET)
  - Summer (DST): UTC+2 (CEST)
- Website: .

Furka (Macedonian: Фурка) is a village in the south-eastern part of North Macedonia. It is situated in the center of the triangle between Bogdanci, Dojran and Valandovo, and is 10 km (6.2 mi) from Dojran. It lies east of the Vardar, Pugana and Gabroska rivers, and west of the Dojran Basin, at an altitude of 350 m (1,150 ft) above sea level, although the highest peak is 456 m (1,496 ft). All around the village there are little hills, composed of sandy soil and granite. The economy is mostly based around viticulture and agriculture. The population is about 500 people, most of whom are Macedonians and Orthodox Christians.

Furka is part of the Dojran Municipality, which is one of the most popular tourist places in North Macedonia.

== Etymology ==
Stjepan Antoljak suggests that Furka was the place where the Byzantine king Basil II blinded the soldiers of Samuil of Bulgaria, and that the village's name comes the Greek word Φουρκα, furka, which means "place of execution". This theory is considered as incorrect. Aleksandar Stojanovski suggests that origin of the name is from Turkish word "fursat" (bad people), because villagers had never allowed Turkish people to come to live in Furka. The true origin of the name of Furka is still unknown.

== History ==
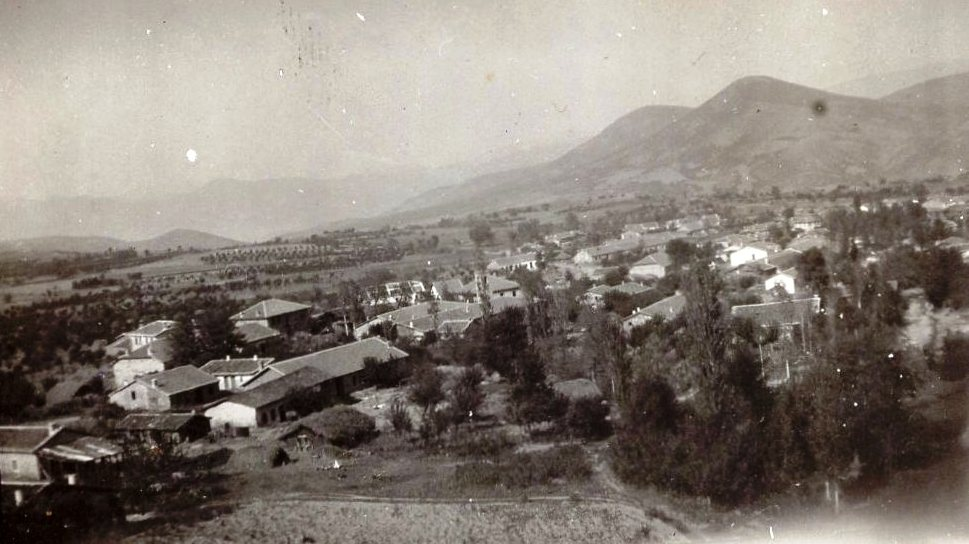
Furka, 1931

According to historical sources, Furka existed for at least 1000 years.

During the period of the Turkish occupation of the country, Furka was settled 2.5 km (1.6 mi) north from the village of today. The village had a few hostelries and 50 households, and was located on the road between Üsküb (Skopje) and Selânik (Thessaloniki) and the road between Istanbul and Albania.

In 1530, Furka is mentioned as a derbendci village, one which guarded an important area in exchange for tax exemptions, and some other benefits. Except for agriculture, people were thus mainly occupied with their duties as derbendci. They were responsible for keeping the road between Valandovo and Dojran, on which Furka was settled, safe from Turkish rebels. One male of every household stood guard every day. Therefore, some historians believe that, for a few decades, the name "Derven" was added to the name "Furka".

By 1573, Furka had grown to 100 households and 50 single people. In the second half of the eighteenth century, people started to move from old Furka and settled the village of today, 2.5 km (1.6 mi) south of the old village. Legend says that three monks who passed through Furka stopped to spend the night in one of the hostelries, but they were brutally killed by Turkish brigands. People were scared of the frequent attacks and started to move. The location of old Furka today is called Аниште, Anishte, meaning "hostelries".

They continued with agriculture and, in 1878, they built a new church dedicated to Sveti Ilija (Saint Eliyah).

== Demographics ==
According to the 2002 census, the village had a total of 570 inhabitants. The ethnic composition of the village was:

- Macedonian: 563
- Serb: 6
- Other: 1

According to the 2021 census, the village of Furka had 459 inhabitants and the ethnic composition was:

- Macedonian: 445
- Serb: 1
- Other: 3
- Unknown: 10
