= Floresta =

Floresta may refer to:

== Geography ==
- Floresta, Paraná, a city in the state of Paraná, Brazil
- Floresta, Pernambuco, a city in the state of Pernambuco, Brazil
- Floresta, Rio Grande do Sul, a neighbourhood in Porto Alegre, Brazil
- Floresta, Boyacá, a municipality in Boyacá Department, Colombia
- Floresta, Buenos Aires, a neighborhood in Buenos Aires, Argentina
- Floresta, Sicily, a municipality in the province of Messina, Sicily
- La Floresta, Uruguay, a small city in Canelones Department, Uruguay
- La Floresta, Guayaquil, a neighborhood in Guayaquil, Ecuador

== Geology ==
- Floresta Formation, a fossiliferous geological formation of the Altiplano Cundiboyacense, named after Floresta, Boyacá

== Sports ==
- Floresta Esporte Clube, a association football club in the state of Ceará, Brazil

== See also ==
- La Floresta (disambiguation)
