= Luiz Carlos da Silva =

Brazilian marathon runner

Personal information
- Born: Luiz Carlos da Silva; 23 January 1969 (age 57) Floraí, Paraná, Brazil

Sport
- Country: Brazil
- Sport: Athletics
- Event: Marathon running
Medal record
Pan American Games
Bronze medal – third place	1995 Mar del Plata	Marathon

Luiz Carlos da Silva (born 23 January 1969) is a Brazilian former athlete who specialised in the marathon.

Born in Floraí, Paraná, da Silva is also known by his nickname of "Atalaia", which is the name of the city in which he was raised. He set the fastest time for the Porto Alegre marathon when he won the race in 1994. He was a bronze medalist in the marathon at the 1995 Pan American Games in Mar del Plata, behind Benjamín Paredes and Mark Coogan respectively. His personal best time of 2:11:01 came at the 1997 Berlin Marathon, where he placed 13th.
