= La Floresta =

La Floresta can refer to:

- La Floresta, Quito, electoral parish in Quito, Ecuador
- La Floresta, Córdoba, town in Capital Department, Córdoba Province, Argentina
- La Floresta, Lleida, municipality in the province of Lleida, Catalonia, Spain
- La Floresta, Uruguay, beach resort in Canelones Department, Uruguay
- La Floresta (Barcelona–Vallès Line), a train station in Sant Cugat del Vallès, Catalonia, Spain
- La Floresta railway station, a train station in La Floresta, Catalonia, Spain

== See also ==
- Floresta (disambiguation)
