= Esporte Clube Teresópolis =

Teresópolis/DalPonte
- Full name: Esporte Clube Teresópolis
- Founded: July 17, 2003
- Ground: Ginásio Pedro Rage Jahara, Teresópolis, Brazil
- Capacity: 5,100
- Chairman: José Carlos Pedra dos Santos
- Manager: Paulo Mussalém
- League: Liga Futsal
- 2007: Liga Futsal, 9th
| Home colours | Away colours |

Esporte Clube Teresópolis, usually known as Teresópolis, and since 2008 as Teresópolis/DalPonte, is a Brazilian futsal club from Teresópolis, Rio de Janeiro state. Founded on July 17, 2003, it is, as of 2008, competing in Brazilian top division futsal league, which is the Liga Futsal, and competed in the same league in the previous year.

== History ==
On July 17, 2003, Esporte Clube Teresópolis was founded.

Four years after being founded, the club won the state championship for the first time, beating Petrópolis Esporte Clube, of the neighbor city of Petrópolis in the final. In the same year the club competed in the Liga Futsal, finishing in the ninth position.

In 2008, the club is again competing in the Liga Futsal. Due to a partnership with sports manufacturer DalPonte, Teresópolis is competing as Teresópolis/DalPonte.

== Achievements ==
- Campeonato Carioca de Futsal:
  - Winners (1): 2007
- Campeonato Carioca de Futsal Sub-20:
  - Winners (1): 2005
