= Brazilian wine =

Wine making in Brazil

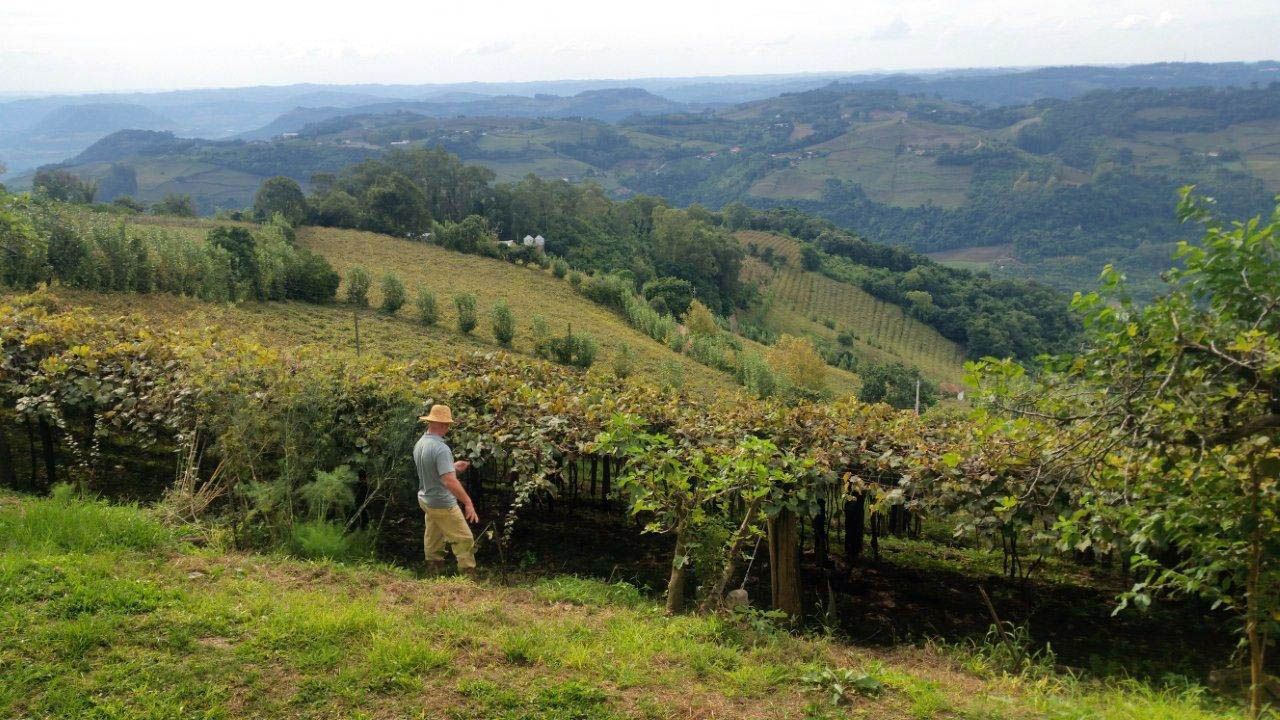
Vineyards in the Vale dos Vinhedos, in the state of Rio Grande do Sul

Brazil is the third-largest producer of wine in Latin America, behind Argentina and Chile; production in 2018 was 3.1 million hectolitres (82,000,000 US gal), slightly more than New Zealand. In 2019, Brazil was the 15th largest wine producer in the world. A substantial area is devoted to viticulture: 82,000 hectares (200,000 acres) in 2018, though much of it produces table grapes rather than wine grapes.

Better quality wines (Brazilian Portuguese: vinho fino) are produced from the European grapevine Vitis vinifera, and in 2003 only some 5,000 ha (12,000 acres) were planted with such vines. The rest are American vines or hybrid vines, many of which are easier to cultivate under Brazilian growing conditions.

== Climate and geography ==
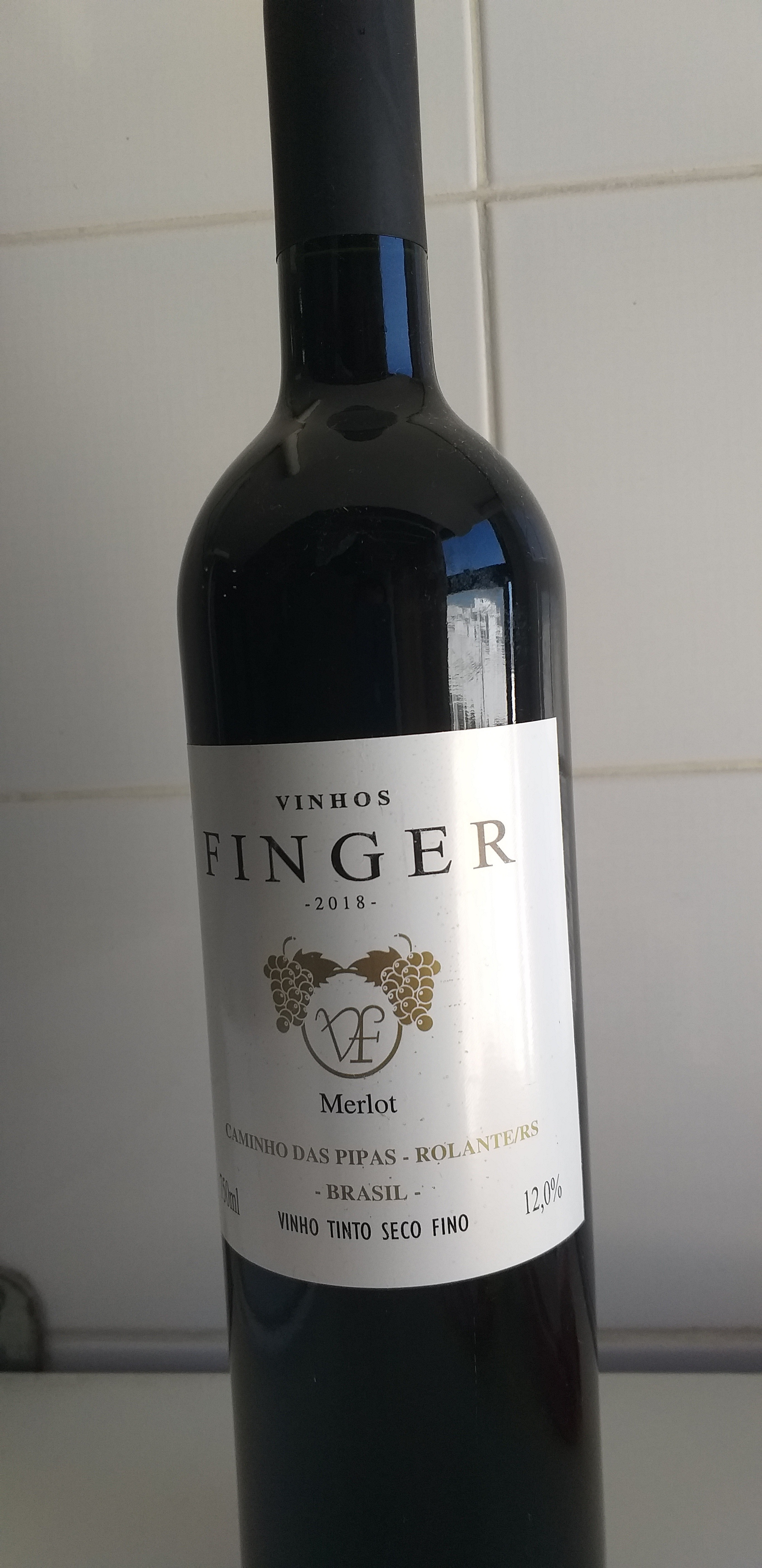
Wine from Rio Grande do Sul, Brazil

Brazil stretches from the equator to the subtropics, and its enormous size and topographic variation mean that climate varies widely.

Most of the wine production of Brazil is concentrated in the temperate south of the country, 90% of which is produced in the state of Rio Grande do Sul alone. The state boasts 4 different wine regions, which span between the 28th and 34th parallel south, similar to other wine-producing regions in Argentina, Chile, South Africa and Australia. The oldest and most important wine-producing region is Serra Gaúcha ("Gaucho Highlands"), especially celebrated for its sparkling wine. The others are Campanha, in the pampas region bordering Uruguay and Argentina, Serra do Sudeste and Campos de Cima da Serra. Smaller-scale viticulture also takes place in the neighbouring state of Santa Catarina.

While wine grapes are traditionally thought of as unsuitable for hot climates, winemaking has been successful in São Francisco Valley in Pernambuco, which has a hot semi-arid climate. It is notable for being able to produce two crops of grapes each year.

== History ==
The 29th parallel south also runs through South Africa and Australia (interactive map)

Several less successful attempts at introducing European vines into Brazil were made during the centuries. The first vines were brought to Brazil by the Portuguese in 1532, who planted them in the state São Paulo. Jesuits brought Spanish vines to Rio Grande do Sul in 1626, and 18th century settlers from the Azores brought vine cuttings from Madeira and the Azores. In 1840, plantations of Isabella (a cultivar of the species Vitis labrusca) on the south coast of Rio Grande are considered the first successful vine plantations in Brazil. By the late 1870s, winemaking was more definitely established and had taken hold in Serra Gaúcha, where Italian immigrants did much of the vine-growing, and mostly American vines were produced. Some Italian varieties and Tannat were later added.

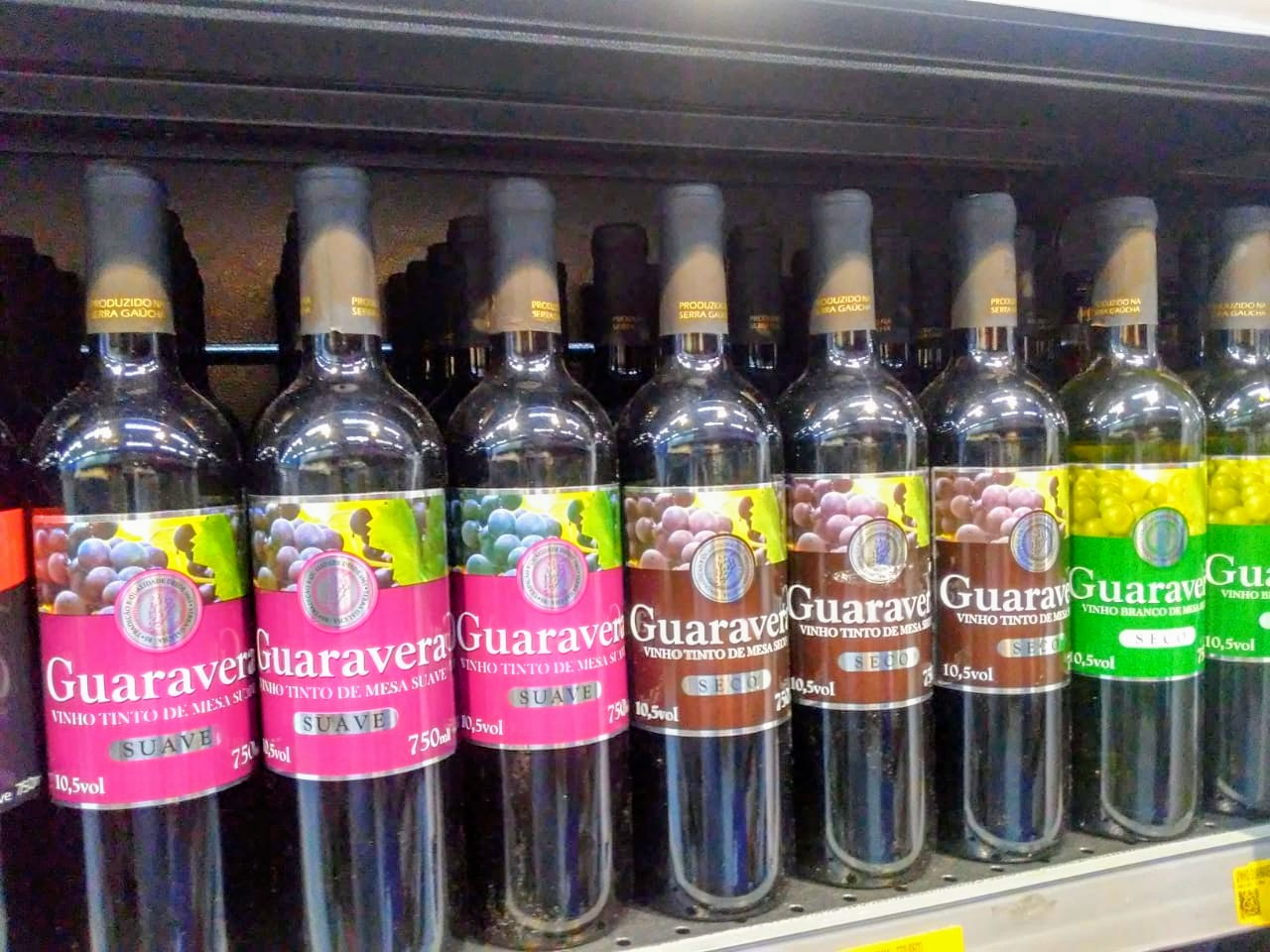
Brazilian wine for sale in a supermarket in Paraná

Wine production with higher quality ambitions started in the 1970s, when several international wine companies such as Moet & Chandon invested in Brazil in the 1970s and brought in know-how and modern equipment.

== See also ==
- Uruguay wine
- Argentina wine
- Winemaking
- Agriculture in Brazil
- Vitiviniculture in Paraná
