= La Floresta, Quito =

Coordinates: 0.2086°S 78.4862°W

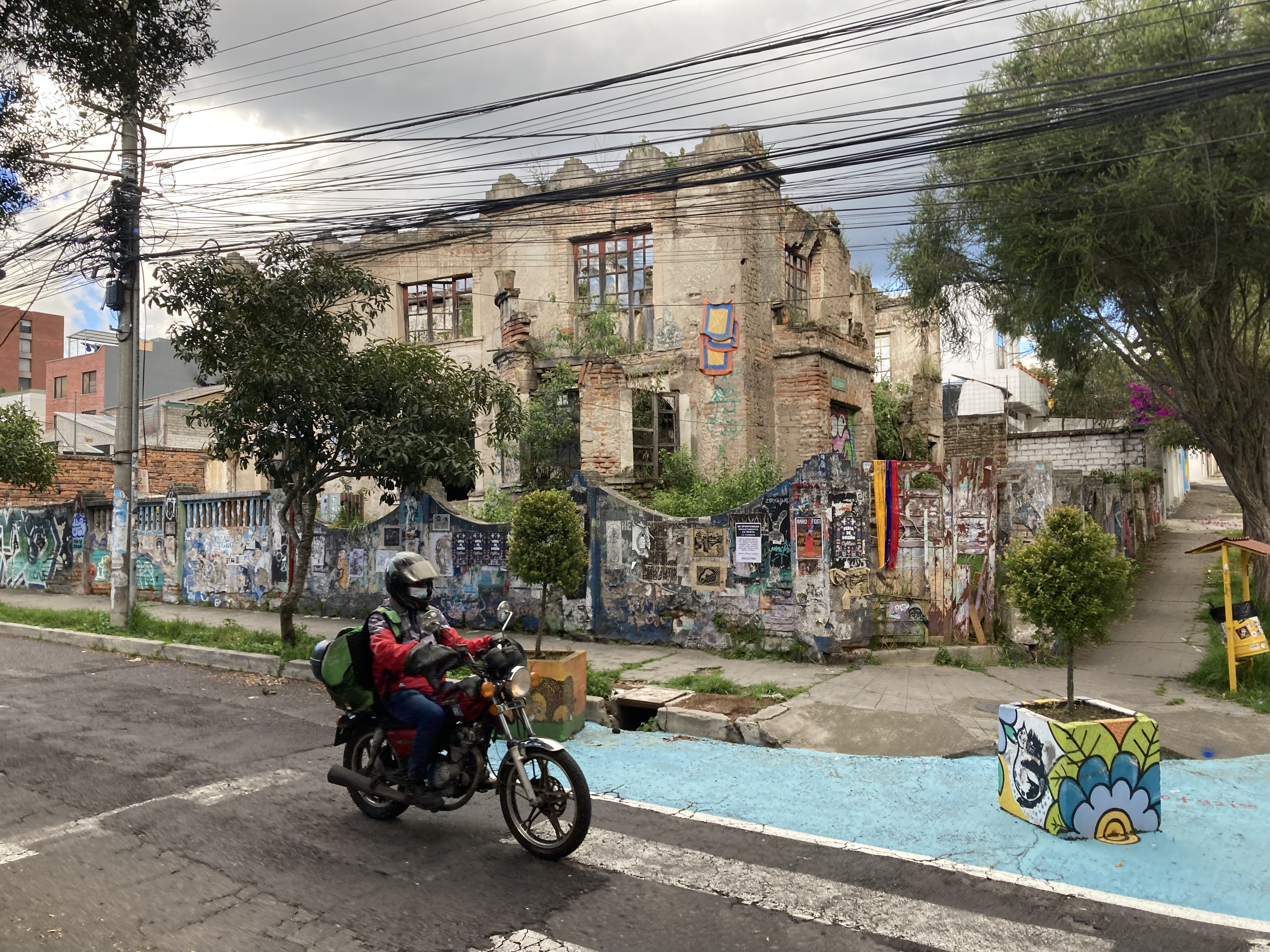
A motorcyclist on Valladolid Street in La Floresta

La Floresta is an electoral parish (Spanish: parroquia electoral urbana) or district of Quito, the capital city of Ecuador. The parish was established as a result of the October 2006 political elections when the city was divided into 19 urban electoral parishes.

La Floresta is also an emblematic and cultural neighborhood of Quito, funded in 1917 as a "Garden City". It has over 100 houses classified as National Heritage. It is now part of Administración Zonal La Mariscal.
