= São Jorge do Ivaí =

Coordinates: 23°24′S 52°17′W

- Municipality
- Flag
- Interactive map of São Jorge do Ivaí
- Country: Brazil
- Region: Southern
- State: Paraná
- Mesoregion: Norte Central Paranaense

Population (2020)
  - Total: 5,543
- Time zone: UTC−3 (BRT)

São Jorge do Ivaí is a municipality in the state of Paraná in the Southern Region of Brazil.

== See also ==
- List of municipalities in Paraná
