= Sarandi, Paraná =

City in Paraná, Brazil

Sarandi
- City
- City of Sarandi
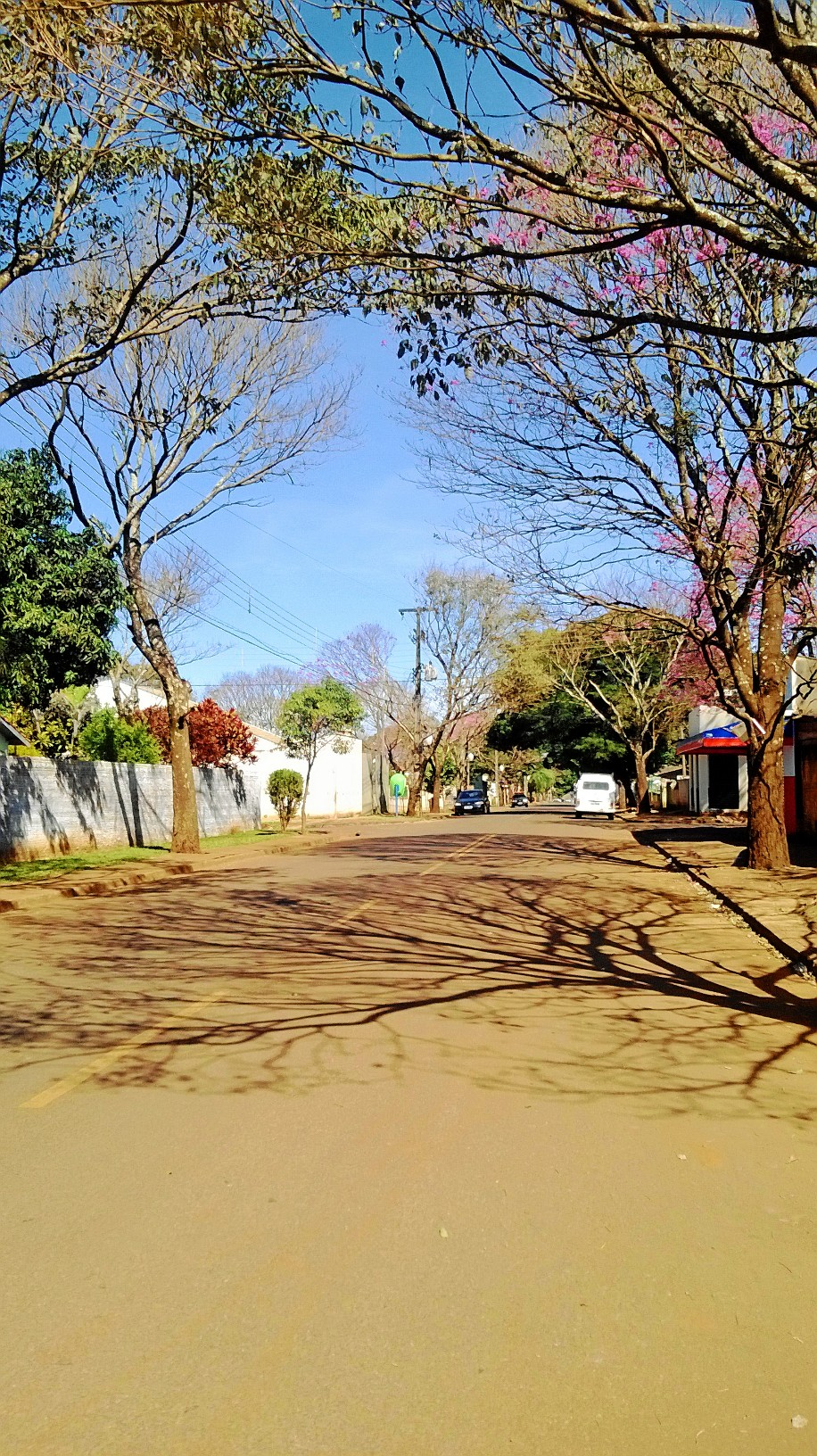

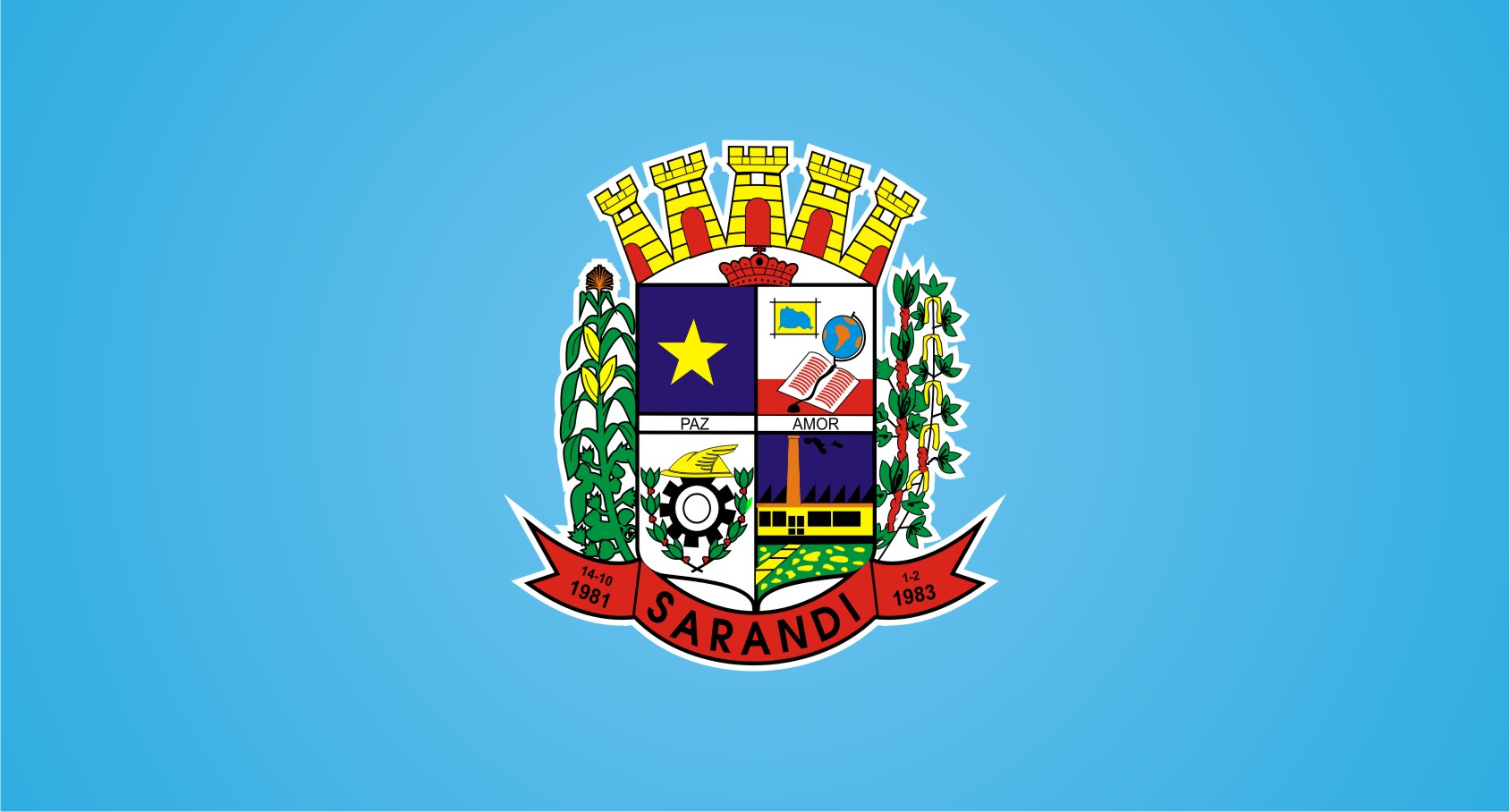
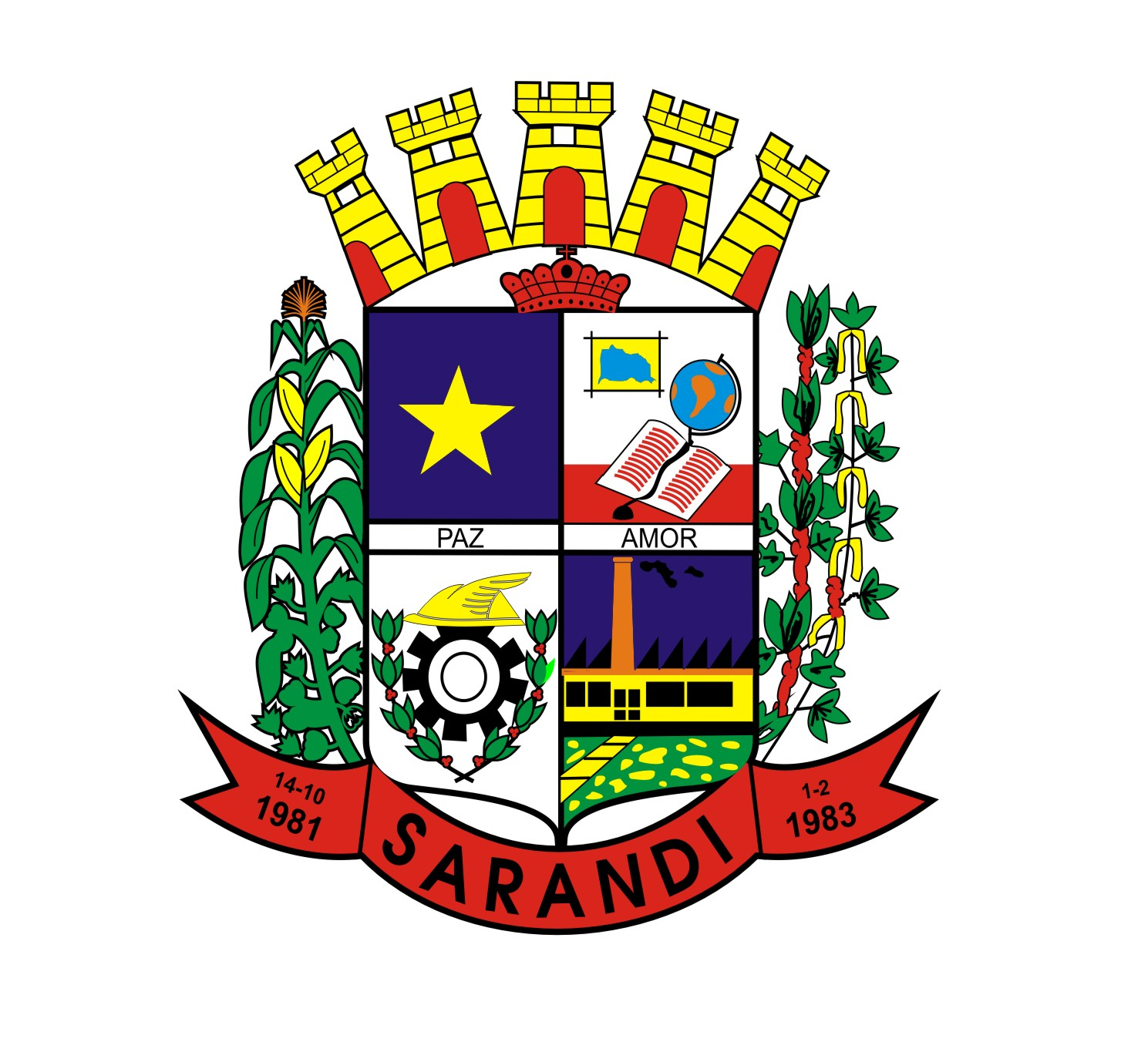
- Flag Coat of arms

- Location in Brazil
- Coordinates: 23°26′38″S 51°52′26″W
- Country: Brazil
- Region: South
- State: Paraná
- Founded: October 14, 1981

Government
  - Mayor: Walter Volpato (PSDB)

Area
  - Total: 103.226 km^{2} (39.856 sq mi)
- Elevation: 592 m (1,942 ft)

Population (2022 Census)
  - Total: 118,455
  - Estimate (2025): 128,106
  - Density: 800.74/km^{2} (2,073.9/sq mi)
- Time zone: UTC−3 (BRT)

Sarandi is a Brazilian municipality in the state of Paraná, situated in the mesoregion North Central Paranaense. The population according to the 2022 Census is 118,455 inhabitants.

== History ==
Sarandi was outlined in the Company's maps Improvements of Northern Paraná in 1947. It was the beginning of the sale of lots in urban region, which would constitute the locality and would only serve to "supply center" of the Railroad Rede Viação Parana/Santa Catarina.

However, documents and statements related to possession of land reveal the presence of families in the rural area since the 1930s, coming to increase considerably in the next decade.

The first families misfits careen their way toward the ground, opened clearings and formed the first coffee plantations. Many of these pioneers, years later, were the first residents also in urban area, contributing to the development of the locality.

The first inhabitants were, in their majority, immigrants coming from the state of São Paulo and the Brazilian Northeastern region, dreaming with the riches of Northern Paraná. They have acquired their lands, by opening the mata and forming large rural lots. Thus began the planting of coffee.

In the urban area, in 1974, the loteadoras began the sale of land. But the real estate boom occurred in 1976. On occasion, a large number of families left the field by virtue of frost which decimated the coffee plantations.

The success in selling urban land made possible the opening of new subdivisions. The strong economic growth, the expansion of the urban area and the increase in the collection of taxes are driving the emergence of a popular movement calling for the political emancipation of the locality, which at that time belonged to Marialva. A popular plebiscite in 1981 approved the creation of the municipality of Sarandi, according to the Law in 7052/1982.

== Metropolitan Region ==
Today, Sarandi search solve several problems that come from your appearance, such as the lack of planning and urban development, education, culture, health, education, and violence, which, to the few, result in improvements in the quality of life of its population.

By Positioning the municipality in relation to the metropolitan region with law project in proceedings in the Legislative Assembly of the State, it should be a reading of material published in September 2005, by Official of UEM - Universidade Estadual de Maringa, sheet 3/ Urbanism, under title "Radiography of the metropolitan region".

Researchers from the State University of Maringa and other institutions connected to the Network Center of the Metropolises pointing the problems and the solutions to the cities. Thus, the Core Metropolitan Region of Maringa/UEM, the Observatory network of the Metropolises, headquartered in the Federal University of Rio de Janeiro, developed the project "As goes the metropolitan region of Maringa".

== Demographics ==
Sarandi is a city with growing population and economy. According to estimates from the Brazilian Institute of Geography and Statistics (IBGE), the city had 128,106 inhabitants in 2025. The city shows developments in urban structure and environmental sustainability, with outstanding performance in education, basic sanitation, urban mobility, and public safety.

== Economy ==
Sarandi's economy is driven by construction and commerce. Dozens of subdivisions, condominiums, and apartments have expanded the city's geographic boundaries. The city has a diversified industrial sector with small, medium, and large companies that generate jobs for the entire region. Notable among them are NOMA do Brasil, one of the largest trucking companies in Latin America, and CPA Trading, an ethanol storage company. Sarandi's commerce, though disadvantaged by its proximity to the main city of Maringá, is strong and constantly growing.

== Tourism ==
Sarandi offers attractions for visitors interested in learning about the city's history and urban development. The city is characterized by planned growth and offers well-structured public spaces. Proximity to the Maringá metropolis facilitates access to various tourist attractions in the metropolitan region.
