= Hermas Brandão =

Brazilian politician

Justice of the Supreme Court of Accounts of Paraná
- In office 5 March 2007 – 12 June 2013
- Succeeded by: Fabio Camargo

Governor of Paraná (interim)
- In office 4 September 2006 – 31 December 2006
- Preceded by: Roberto Requião
- Succeeded by: Roberto Requião

Secretary of Agriculture and Supplies of Paraná
- In office 1995–1998

State deputy of Paraná
- In office 1983 – 31 January 2007

Mayor of Andirá
- In office 1 February 1977 – 31 January 1982
- Preceded by: Mauro Cardoso Oliveira
- Succeeded by: Alarico Abib

Personal details
- Born: Hermas Eurides Brandão; 5 May 1943 (age 83) Campinas, São Paulo, Brazil
- Party: PSDB
- Education: Brazilian University of Juridical Sciences of Rio de Janeiro

Hermas Eurides Brandão (born 5 May 1943) is a Brazilian lawyer, notary, businessman and politician.

He briefly served as the interim governor of the state of Paraná, from 4 September to 31 December 2006, when the then-governor, Roberto Requião, briefly stepped down. Prior to the position, he was also a state secretary, state deputy, and the mayor of the town of Andirá.

== Biography ==
Born on 5 May 1945 in Campinas, Brandão is the son of Eurides Fioravante Brandão and Ercília Fioravante Brandão. His father was also a notary and was a councilman in Andirá. Hermas married Ana Maria Martins, and together they had three children: Ana Cristina, Carla, and Hermas Eurides Brandão Júnior, who also became a state deputy. He is also the grandfather of former state deputy Evandro Junior.

Having graduated with a law degree from the Brazilian University of Juridical Sciences of Rio de Janeiro, he is active in the agricultural industry. He was a local clerk as a notary with the Real Estate Registry of the District of Andirá. He resigned from both the position and the political party he was a member of for some years when he, in 2007, became an advisor to the Court of Accounts of the state of Paraná (TCE).

Brandão began his political career in the 1970s, when he became the mayor of Andirá in 1977, a position he would remain in until 1982. In 1983, he became a state deputy in the Legislative Assembly of Paraná (ALEP). He was in that position until 2002.

He was the state Secretary of Agriculture and Supplies from 1995 to 1998. He also was the vice-president of the legislative assembly from 1993 to 1994, and in 2000 was elected president of the Legislative Assembly, a position he held until 2006. In September 2006, governor Roberto Requião and his vice-governor, Orlando Pessuti, briefly stepped back from state government, with Brandão stepping in due to him being the president of the state assembly. At that time, Brandão was a member of the Brazilian Social Democracy Party (PSDB). In his place, Pedro Ivo Ilkiv, of the Workers' Party (PT), became state assembly president.

In March 2007, Brandão became a justice on the Court of Accounts of the State of Paraná. He retired in June 2013 after reaching the maximum age for the seat, at 70 years old.

Brandão has received various awards, including as an honorary citizen of both Maringá and Curitiba.
