= Paiçandu =

- Municipality
- Flag Coat of arms

- Location in Brazil
- Coordinates: 23°27′20″S 52°2′30″W
- Country: Brazil
- Region: South
- State: Paraná

Area
  - Total: 171.4 km^{2} (66.2 sq mi)

Population (2020)
  - Total: 41,773
  - Density: 243.7/km^{2} (631.2/sq mi)
- Time zone: UTC−3 (BRT)

Paiçandu is a city in the state of Paraná in southern Brazil. Paiçandu was founded in 1948, and emancipated on 19 November 1960. Its population was 41,773 (2020) and its area is 171.4 km^{2}.

== Geography ==
- Altitude: 550 m
- Distance from Curitiba, the state capital: 449 km
- Distance from Paranaguá, Paraná's primary seaport: 540 km
- Distance from Maringá, site of the nearest major airport: 7 km

== Climate ==
Paiçandu's subtropical climate offers hot summers and concentrated wet seasons; Paiçandu has no dry season. The average high temperature is 22 °C. Frost rarely accompanies the winter weather (the average low temperature is 18 °C).

== Economy ==
=== Participation in the Municipal GIP ===
- Farming: 8.72%
- Industry: 38.92%
- Services: 52.35%

Number of inhabitants who are actively employed: 14,597

=== Primary crops ===
- Soy
- Maize
- Sugar cane

=== Primary industries ===
- Health and nutrition
- Leather
- Brewing

== See also ==
- List of cities in Brazil
