= Ourizona =

Coordinates: 23°23′S 52°11′W

- Municipality
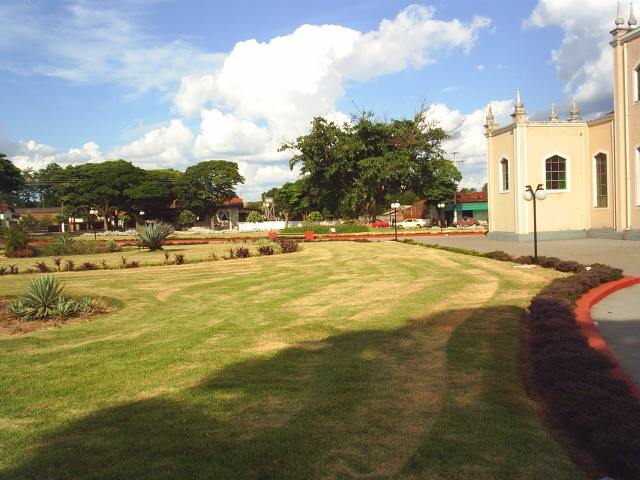

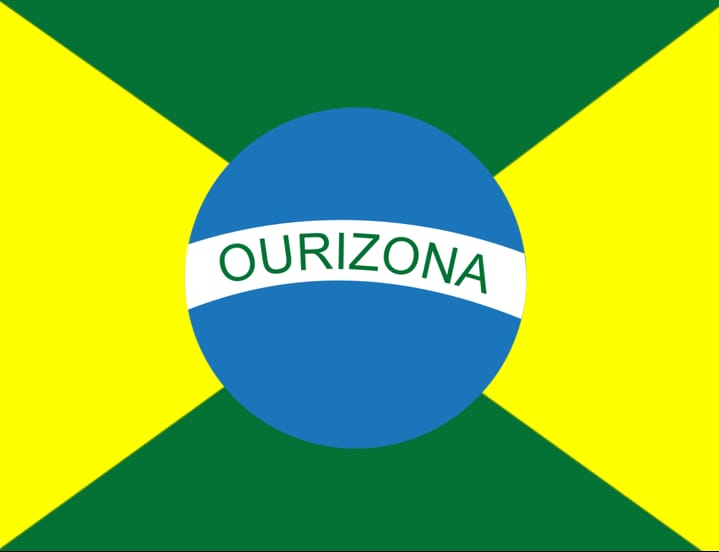
- Flag
- Interactive map of Ourizona
- Country: Brazil
- Region: Southern
- State: Paraná
- Mesoregion: Norte Central Paranaense

Population (2020)
  - Total: 3,425
- Time zone: UTC−3 (BRT)

Ourizona is a municipality in the state of Paraná in the Southern Region of Brazil.

== See also ==
- List of municipalities in Paraná
