= Rosário do Ivaí =

Coordinates: 24.2778°S 51.275°W

- Municipality
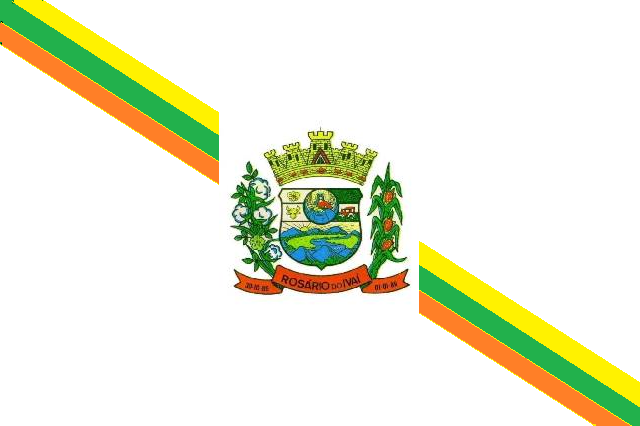
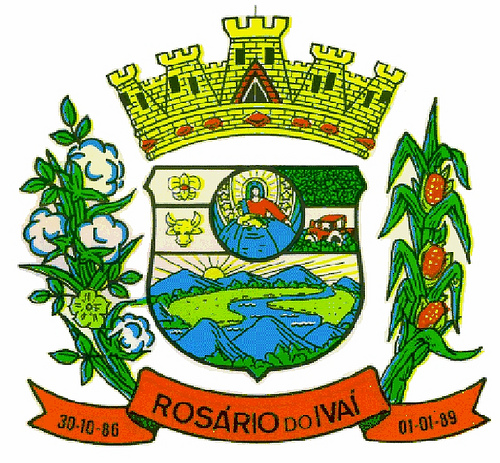
- Flag Coat of arms
- Interactive map of Rosário do Ivaí
- Country: Brazil
- Region: Southern
- State: Paraná
- Mesoregion: Norte Central Paranaense

Area
  - Total: 143.4 sq mi (371.3 km^{2})

Population (2020)
  - Total: 4,786
  - Density: 33/sq mi (12.9/km^{2})
- Time zone: UTC -3

Rosário do Ivaí is a municipality in the state of Paraná in the Southern Region of Brazil. The inhabitants are called Rosarienses. The municipality extends over 371.3 km² and had 4,786 inhabitants in the last census. The demographic density is 12.9 inhabitants per km² in the municipality’s territory.

Neighboring the municipalities of Rio Branco do Ivaí, Grandes Rios and Ortigueira, Rosário do Ivaí is located 35 km south-west of Ortigueira, the closest city in the surrounding area.

== See also ==
- List of municipalities in Paraná
