= Presidente Castelo Branco, Paraná =

Coordinates: 23°16′40″S 52°9′7″W

Presidente Castelo Branco
- Municipality
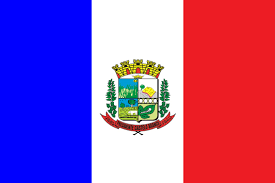
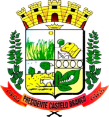
- Flag Coat of arms

- Localization of Presidente Castelo Branco in Paraná
- Country: Brazil
- Region: Southern
- State: Paraná
- Mesoregion: Noroeste Paranaense
- Established: 1964

Government
  - Mayor: João Pericles Martinati (2025-2028) re-elected (Social Democratic Party (Brazil, 2011))
  - City Council (speaker): Genivaldo Roberto Antonio (2026-2028)

Population (2020)
  - Total: 4,336
  - Density: 72.1/sq mi (27.84/km^{2})
- Time zone: UTC−3 (BRT)
- Area code: +55 44
- HDI (2022): 0,742 idh – high
- Website: presidentecastelobranco.pr.gov.br (Prefecture)

Presidente Castelo Branco is a municipality in the state of Paraná in the Southern Region of Brazil.

== See also ==
- List of municipalities in Paraná
