= Ângulo, Paraná =

Ângulo
- Municipality
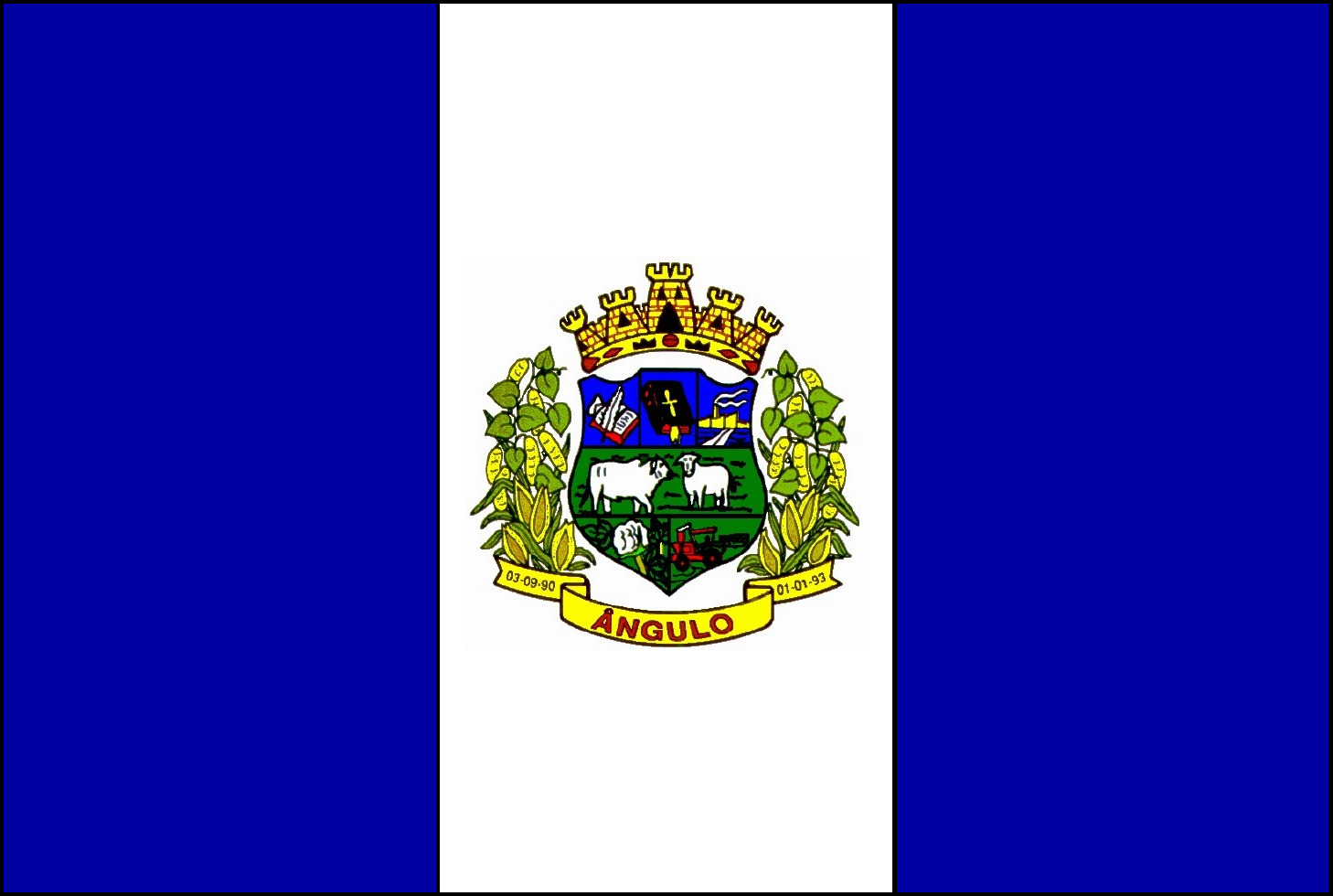
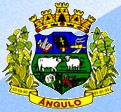
- Flag Coat of arms

- Location in Brazil
- Coordinates: 23°11′42″S 51°54′54″W
- Country: Brazil
- Region: Southern
- State: Paraná
- Mesoregion: Nortoeste Central

Population (2020)
  - Total: 2,930
- Time zone: UTC−3 (BRT)

Ângulo is a municipality in the state of Paraná in the Southern Region of Brazil.

== Geography ==
It has an area of 106.0 square kilometers and is located at a latitude of 23°11'42" south and a longitude of 51°54'54" west, at an altitude of 300 meters. Its population, according to the IBGE estimate of 2019, was 2,928 inhabitants.

== See also ==
- List of municipalities in Paraná
