= Ivatuba =

Coordinates: 23°37′S 52°13′W

- Municipality
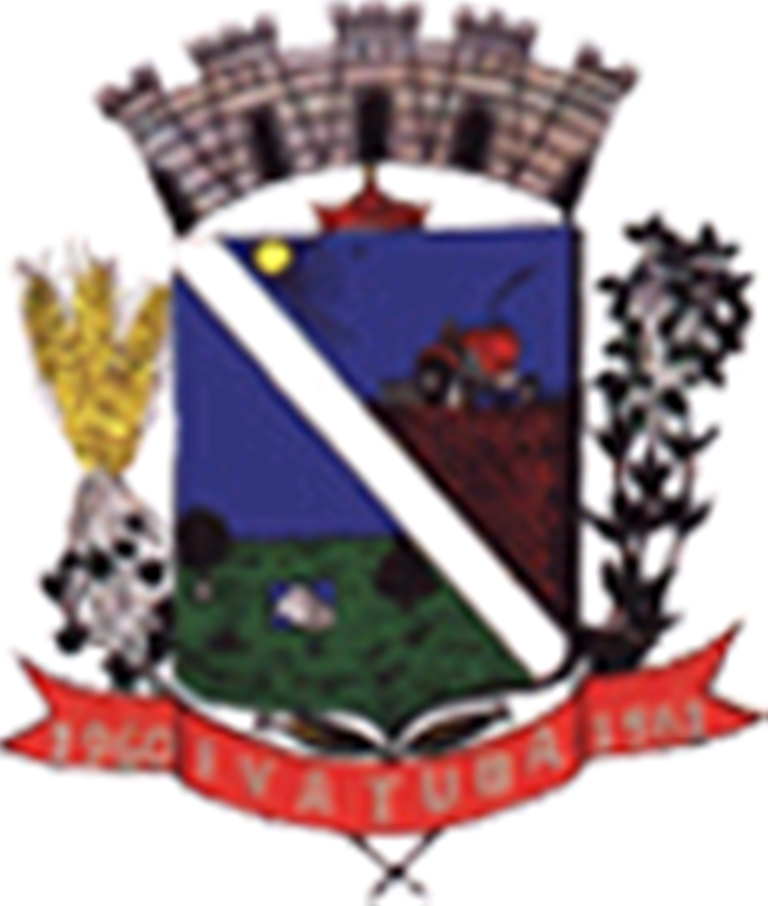
- Coat of arms
- Interactive map of Ivatuba
- Country: Brazil
- Region: Southern
- State: Paraná
- Mesoregion: Norte Central Paranaense

Population (2020)
  - Total: 3,279
- Time zone: UTC−3 (BRT)

Ivatuba is a municipality in the state of Paraná in the Southern Region of Brazil.

== See also ==
- List of municipalities in Paraná
