= Mandaguari =

Coordinates: 23.5478°S 51.6708°W

- Municipality
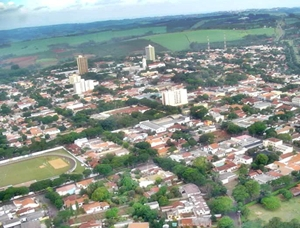

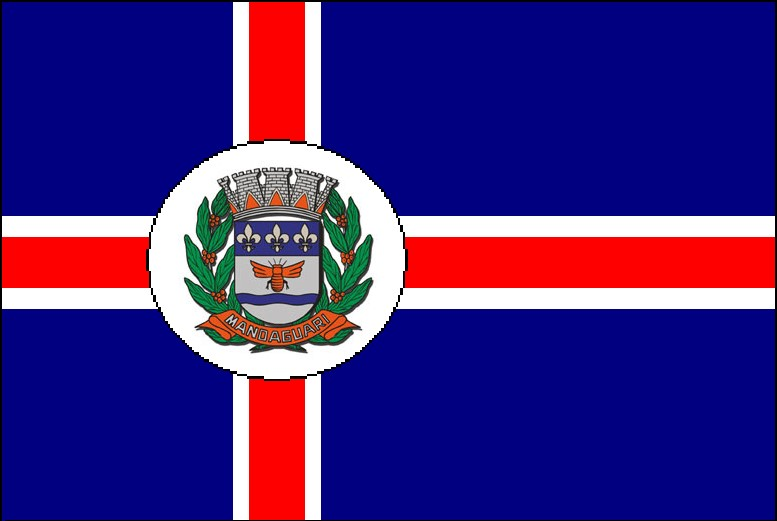
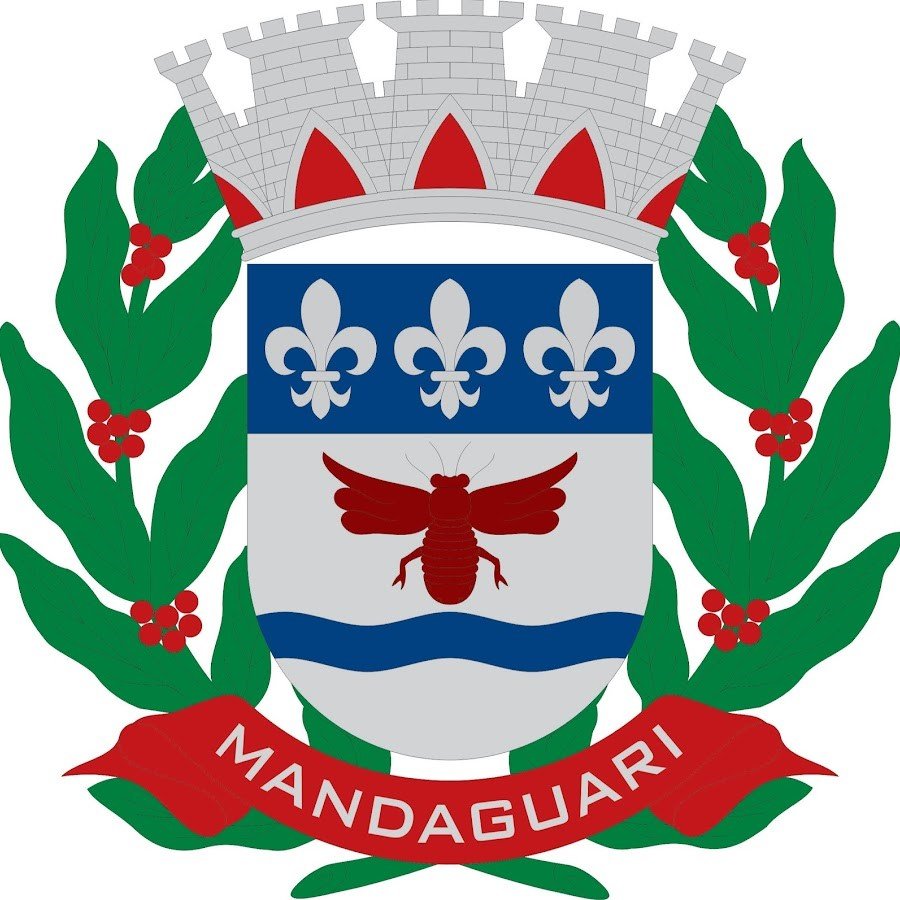
- Flag Coat of arms
- Interactive map of Mandaguari
- Country: Brazil
- Region: Southern
- State: Paraná
- Mesoregion: Norte Central Paranaense

Population (2020)
  - Total: 34,515
- Time zone: UTC−3 (BRT)

Mandaguari is a municipality in the state of Paraná in the Southern Region of Brazil. Before World War II "Mandaguari" was called "Lovat".

== See also ==
- List of municipalities in Paraná
