= Doutor Camargo =

Coordinates: 23°33′S 52°14′W

- Municipality
- Flag
- Interactive map of Doutor Camargo
- Country: Brazil
- Region: Southern
- State: Paraná
- Mesoregion: Norte Central Paranaense

Population (2020)
  - Total: 5,983
- Time zone: UTC−3 (BRT)

Doutor Camargo is a municipality in the state of Paraná in the Southern Region of Brazil. The name means Doctor Camarago.

== See also ==
- List of municipalities in Paraná
