= Nova Esperança, Paraná =

Coordinates: 23°11′02″S 52°12′18″W

- Municipality
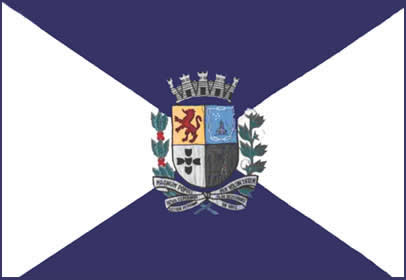
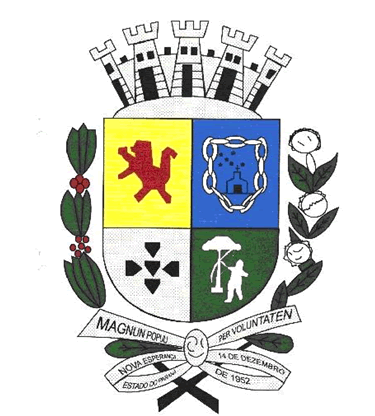
- Flag Coat of arms
- Interactive map of Nova Esperança, Paraná
- Country: Brazil
- Region: Southern
- State: Paraná
- Mesoregion: Noroeste Paranaense

Government
  - Mayor: Eduardo Pasquini (2025-2028) (Liberal Party (Brazil, 2006))

Population (2022)
  - Total: 26.585
- Time zone: UTC−3 (BRT)
- Area code: +55 44
- HDI (2022): 0,748 idh – high
- Website: https://www.novaesperanca.pr.gov.br/

Nova Esperança, Paraná is a municipality in the state of Paraná in the Southern Region of Brazil.

== See also ==
- List of municipalities in Paraná
