= Teixeira Soares =

- Municipality
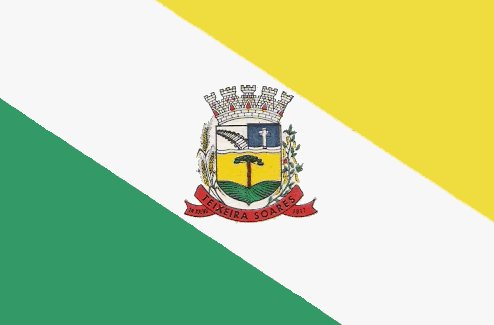
- Flag

- Location in Brazil
- Coordinates: 25°22′4″S 50°27′39″W
- Country: Brazil
- Region: Southern
- State: Paraná
- Mesoregion: Sudeste Paranaense

Population (2020)
  - Total: 12,567
- Time zone: UTC−3 (BRT)

Teixeira Soares is a municipality in the state of Paraná in the Southern Region of Brazil. Its population estimated by the IBGE is 12,567 inhabitants (2020).

== See also ==
- List of municipalities in Paraná
