= Atalaia, Paraná =

Coordinates: 23°09′03″S 52°03′14″W

- Municipality
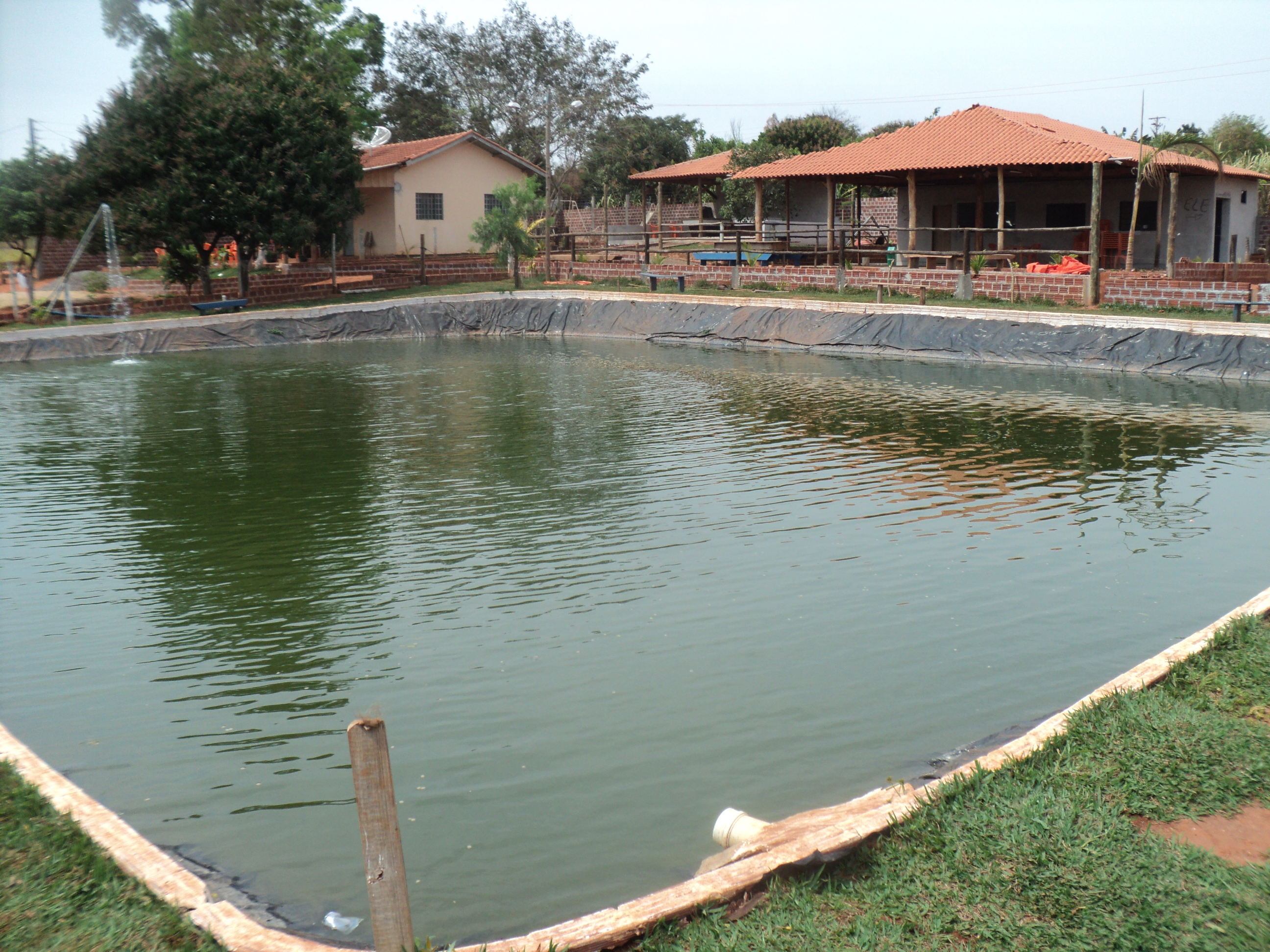

- Coat of arms
- Interactive map of Atalaia, Paraná
- Country: Brazil
- Region: Southern
- State: Paraná
- Mesoregion: Noroeste Paranaense

Population (2020)
  - Total: 3,881
- Time zone: UTC−3 (BRT)

Atalaia, Paraná is a municipality in the state of Paraná in the Southern Region of Brazil.

== See also ==
- List of municipalities in Paraná
