= Bom Sucesso, Paraná =

Bom Sucesso
- Municipality
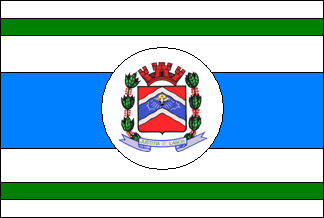
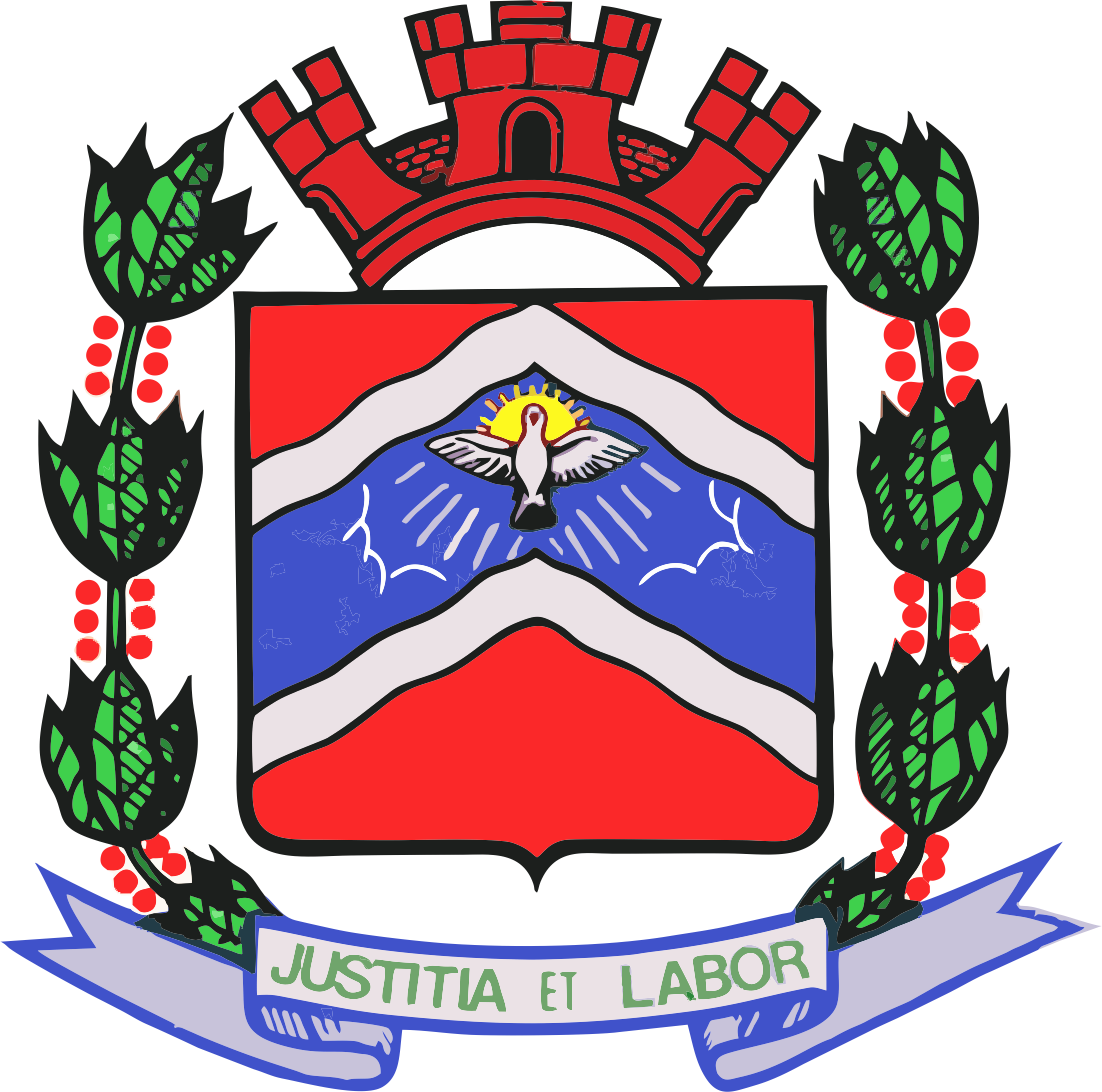
- Flag Coat of arms

- Location in Brazil
- Coordinates: 23°42′36″S 51°45′50″W
- Country: Brazil
- Region: Southern
- State: Paraná
- Mesoregion: Nortoeste Central

Population (2020)
  - Total: 7,068
- Time zone: UTC−3 (BRT)

Bom Sucesso is a municipality in the state of Paraná in the Southern Region of Brazil.

== See also ==
- List of municipalities in Paraná
