= Flórida =

Coordinates: 23°05′13″S 51°57′14″W

Flórida, Paraná
- Municipality
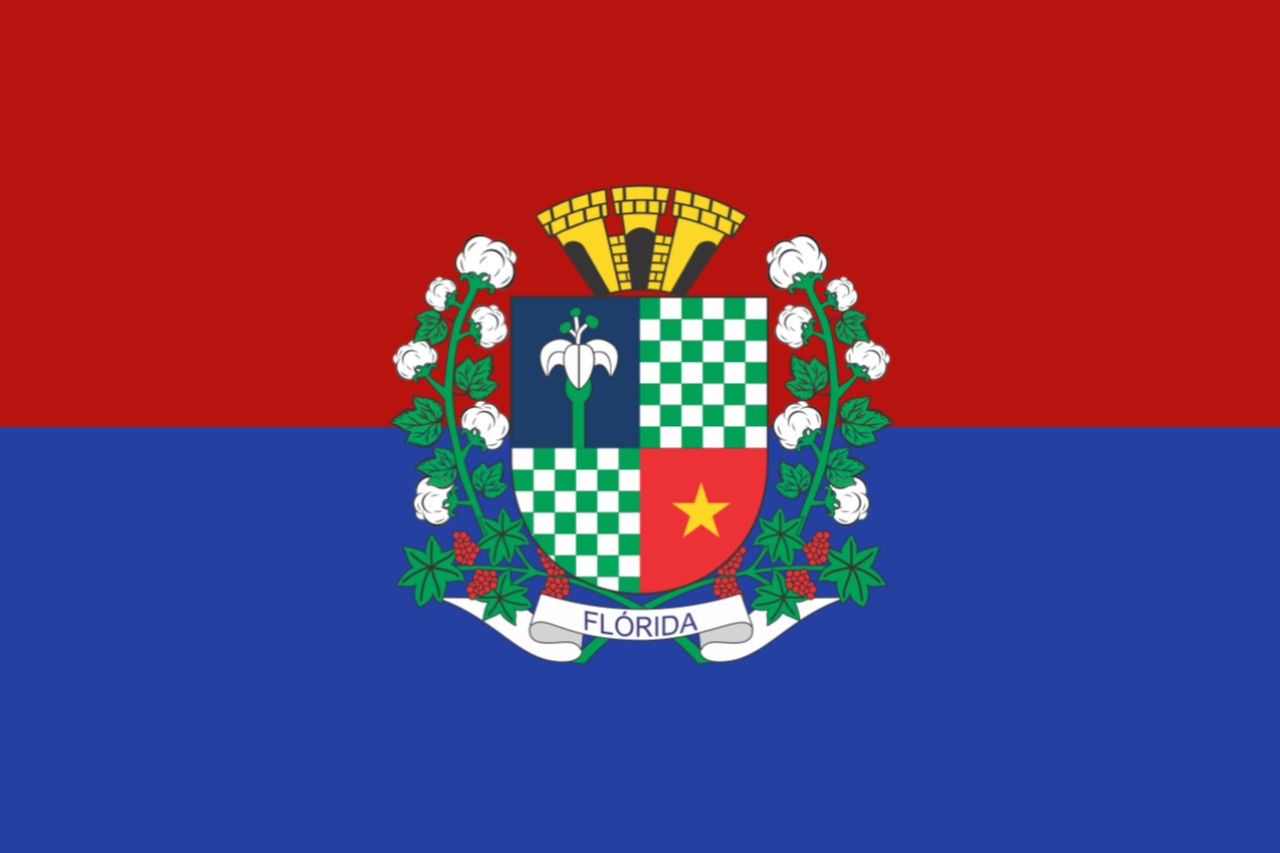
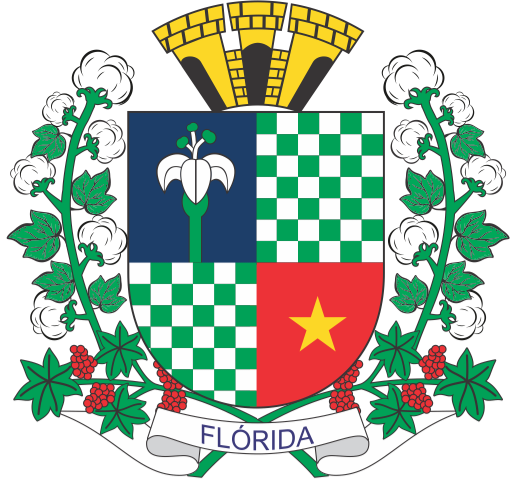
- Flag Coat of arms
- Interactive map of Flórida, Paraná
- Country: Brazil
- Region: Southern
- State: Paraná
- Mesoregion: Noroeste Paranaense

Population (2020)
  - Total: 2,699
- Time zone: UTC−3 (BRT)

Flórida is a municipality in the state of Paraná in the Southern Region of Brazil.

== See also ==
- List of municipalities in Paraná
