= Marumbi =

Coordinates: 23.7058°S 51.6389°W

- Municipality
- Interactive map of Marumbi
- Country: Brazil
- Region: Southern
- State: Paraná
- Mesoregion: Norte Central Paranaense

Population (2020)
  - Total: 4,677
- Time zone: UTC−3 (BRT)

Marumbi is a municipality in the state of Paraná in the Southern Region of Brazil.

== See also ==
- List of municipalities in Paraná
- Parque Nacional Marumbi or Parque Estadual do Pico do Marumbi
