= Iguaraçu =

Coordinates: 23.1969°S 51.8278°W

- Municipality
- Interactive map of Iguaraçu
- Country: Brazil
- Region: Southern
- State: Paraná
- Mesoregion: Noroeste Paranaense

Population (2020)
  - Total: 4,440
- Time zone: UTC−3 (BRT)

Iguaraçu is a municipality in the state of Paraná in the Southern Region of Brazil.

== See also ==
- List of municipalities in Paraná
