= Munhoz de Melo =

Coordinates: 23°08′S 51°46′W

- Municipality
- Interactive map of Munhoz de Melo
- Country: Brazil
- Region: Southern
- State: Paraná
- Mesoregion: Noroeste Paranaense

Population (2020)
  - Total: 4,009
- Time zone: UTC−3 (BRT)

Munhoz de Melo is a municipality in the state of Paraná in the Southern Region of Brazil.

== See also ==
- List of municipalities in Paraná
