= Santa Fé, Paraná =

Coordinates: 23.0378°S 51.805°W

- Municipality
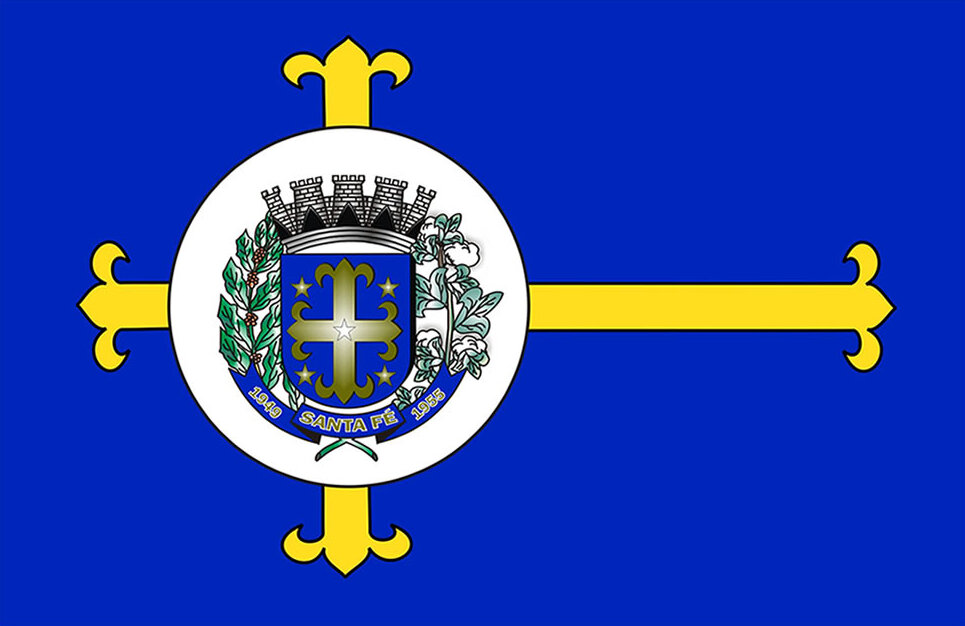
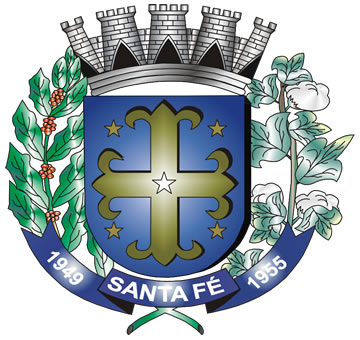
- Flag Coat of arms
- Interactive map of Santa Fé, Paraná
- Country: Brazil
- Region: Southern
- State: Paraná
- Mesoregion: Noroeste Paranaense

Population (2020)
  - Total: 12,186
- Time zone: UTC−3 (BRT)

Santa Fé, Paraná is a municipality in the state of Paraná in the Southern Region of Brazil.

== See also ==
- List of municipalities in Paraná
