= Mandaguaçu =

Coordinates: 23°20′S 52°05′W

- Municipality
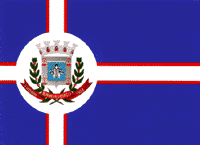
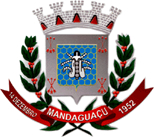
- Flag Coat of arms
- Interactive map of Mandaguaçu
- Country: Brazil
- Region: Southern
- State: Paraná
- Mesoregion: Noroeste Paranaense
- Established: 1952

Government
  - Mayor: José Roberto Mendes (Social Democratic Party (Brazil, 2011))

Area
  - Total: 113,521 sq mi (294,019 km^{2})

Population (2022)
  - Total: 31.457
- Time zone: UTC−3 (BRT)
- Area code: +55 44
- Website: https://www.mandaguacu.pr.gov.br/
- Municipal Council (Website): https://www.camaramandaguari.pr.gov.br/

Mandaguaçu is a municipality in the state of Paraná in the Southern Region of Brazil.

== See also ==
- List of municipalities in Paraná
