= Floresta, Paraná =

Coordinates: 23°35′56″S 52°04′51″W

- Municipality
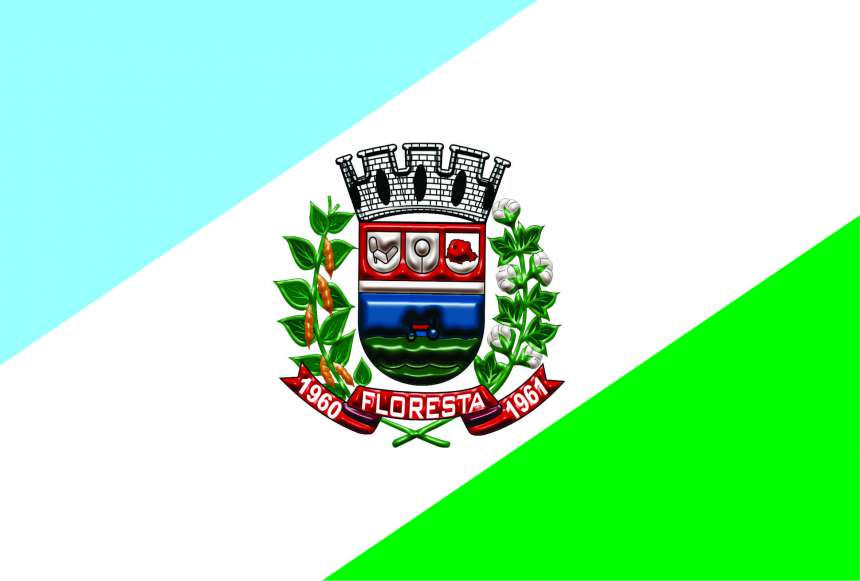
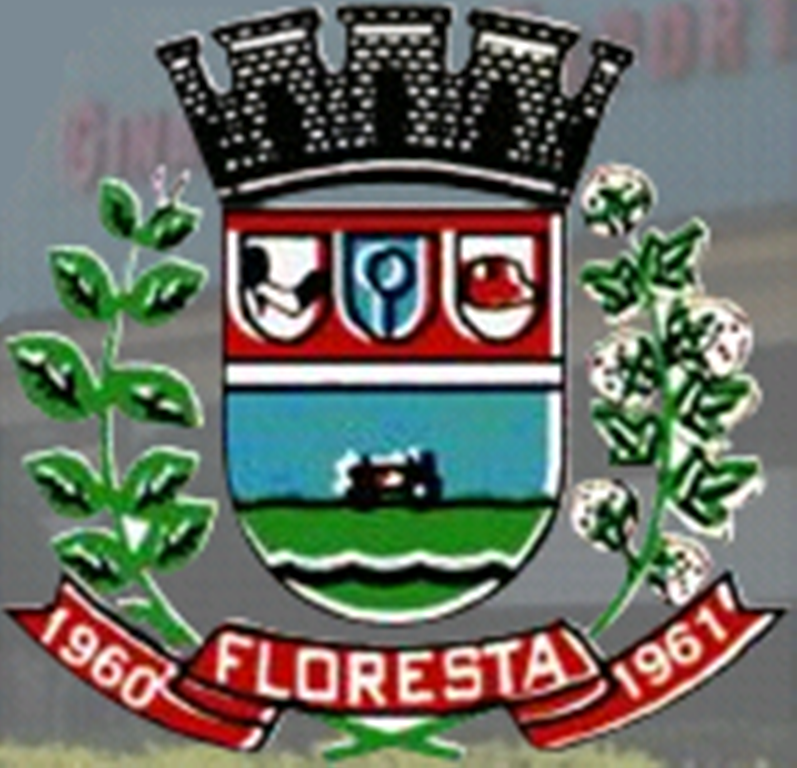
- Flag Coat of arms
- Interactive map of Floresta, Paraná
- Country: Brazil
- Region: Southern
- State: Paraná
- Mesoregion: Norte Central Paranaense

Population (2020)
  - Total: 6,851
- Time zone: UTC−3 (BRT)

Floresta, Paraná is a municipality in the state of Paraná in the Southern Region of Brazil.

== See also ==
- List of municipalities in Paraná
