= Marialva =

Coordinates: 23°28′S 51°42′W

- Municipality
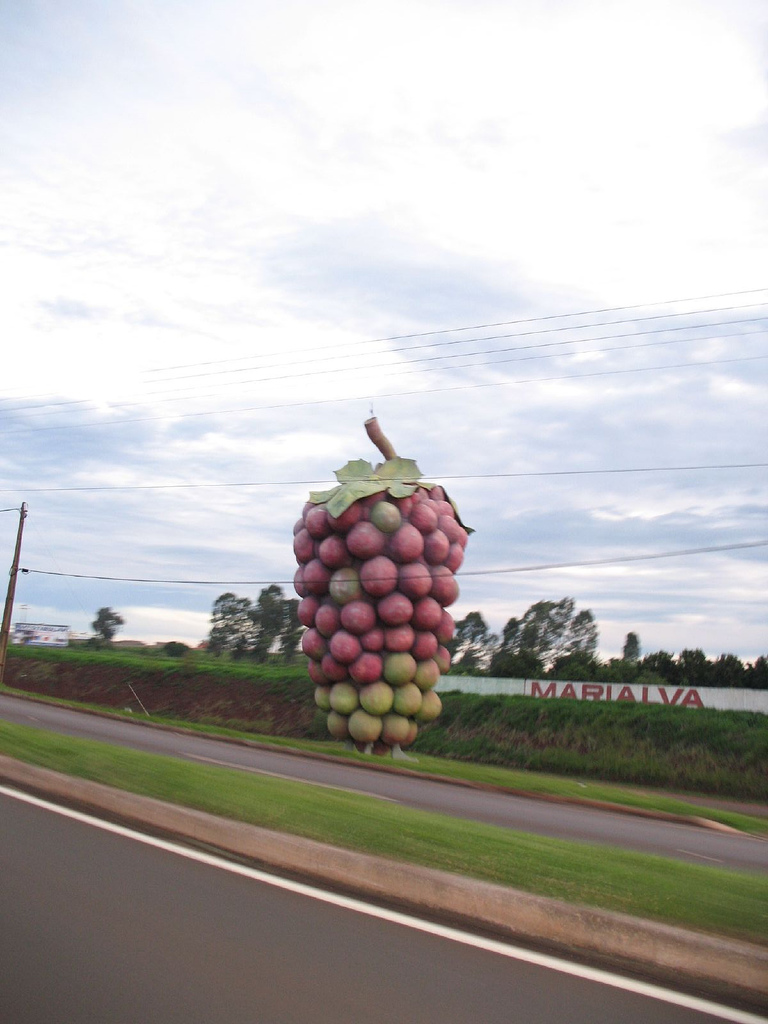

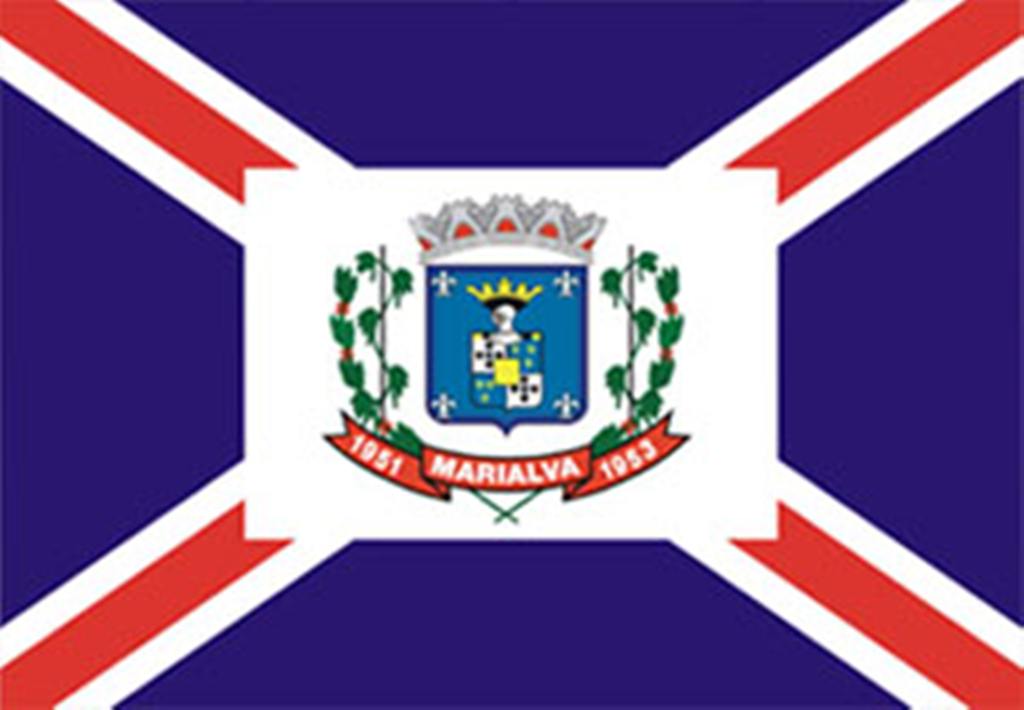
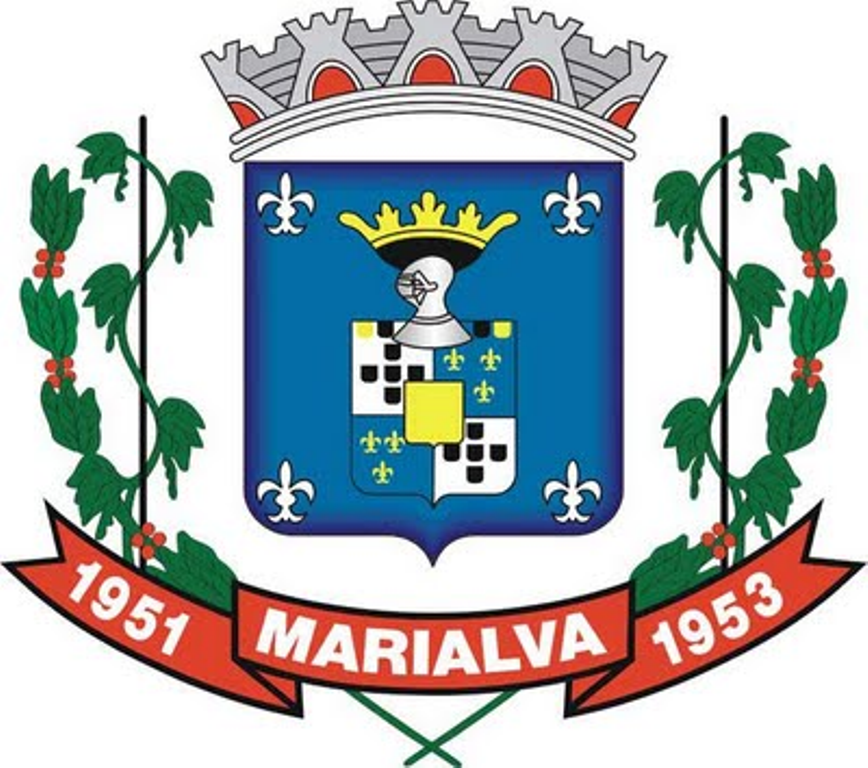
- Flag Coat of arms
- Interactive map of Marialva
- Country: Brazil
- Region: Southern
- State: Paraná
- Mesoregion: Norte Central Paranaense

Population (2020)
  - Total: 35,804
- Time zone: UTC−3 (BRT)

Marialva is a municipality in the state of Paraná in the Southern Region of Brazil.

== See also ==
- List of municipalities in Paraná
