= Culture of Paraná =

The culture of Paraná includes a range of artistic and cultural expressions developed by its residents, manifested through handicraft, customs, traditions, cuisine, religion, and folklore, reflecting the diverse identities within the state.

During the colonial period, the cultural practices of indigenous peoples integrated with influences from Europe, particularly Portugal and Spain. Indigenous traditions, such as the use of herbaceous plants, yerba mate, pine nut, honey, maize, cassava, and tobacco, were adopted by settlers. The tropeiros (muleteers) introduced practices such as drinking chimarrão, coffee, and eating feijão tropeiro. The African population contributed elements such as feijoada, cachaça, and distinct dances and rituals.

During the imperial period, European immigrants, particularly in the southern and eastern regions, introduced their cultural practices, which merged with existing indigenous, African, Portuguese, and Spanish influences, enhancing Paraná's cultural diversity through contributions from Poland, Germany, Ukraine, Lebanon, and Japan.

Paraná's culture reflects a blend of influences from various groups, evident in its architecture, literature, music, and performing and visual arts.

== Ethnic composition and notable figures from Paraná ==
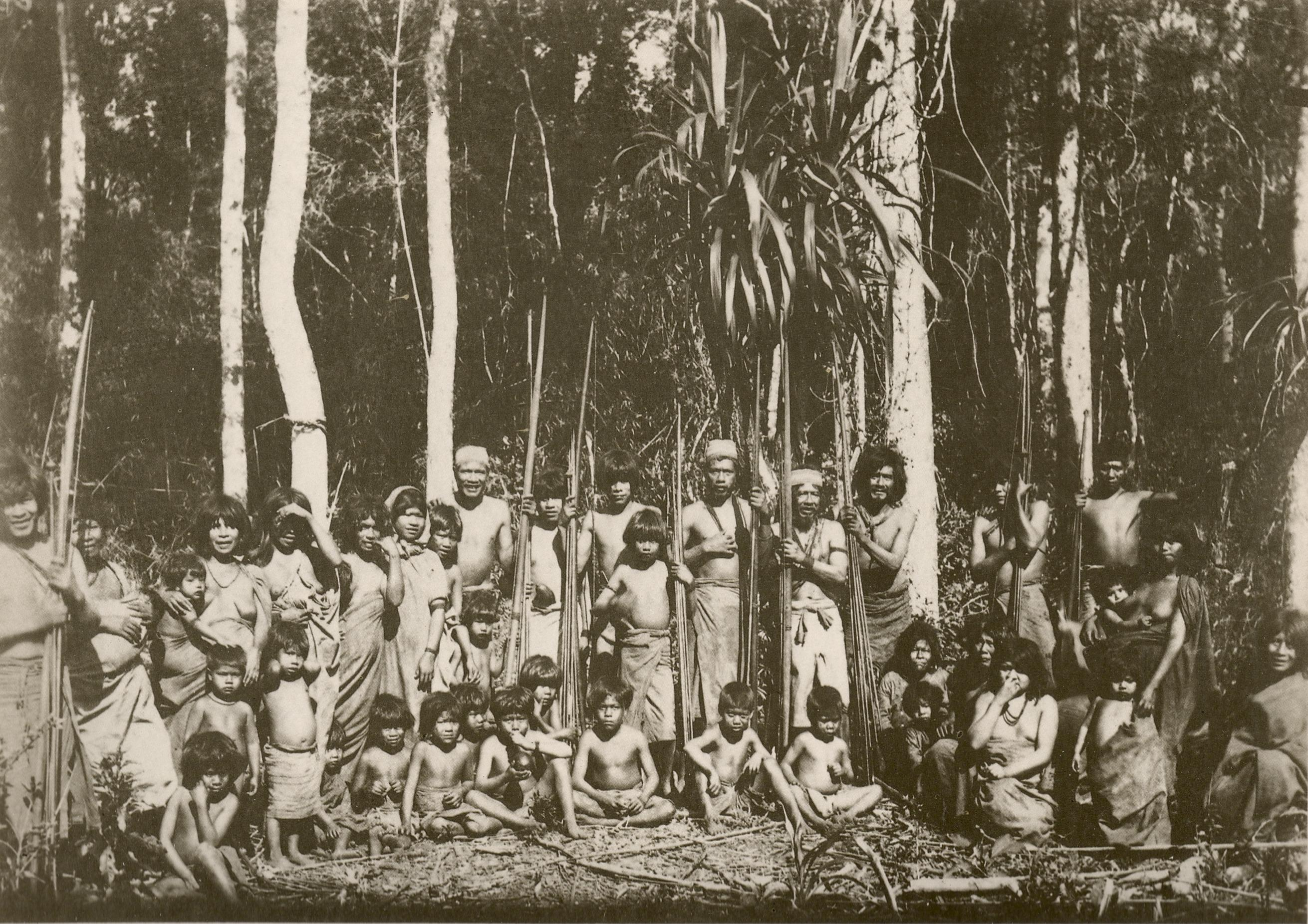
Kaiowá Indians in 1860, in Paraná. Indigenous peoples contributed to the naming of the state and its cities.

Paraná's cultural identity is shaped by a diverse array of ethnic groups, including Portuguese, Spaniards, Italians, Germans, Dutch, Slavs, Poles, Ukrainians, Arabs, Koreans, Japanese, indigenous groups, and Africans, alongside contributions from people of Rio Grande do Sul, Santa Catarina, São Paulo, Minas Gerais, and Northeast Brazil.

Notable figures from Paraná include historian David Carneiro; writers Dalton Trevisan, Laurentino Gomes; Helena Kolody, and Paulo Leminski; scientists César Lattes, Metry Bacila, João José Bigarella, Riad Salamuni, and Newton Freire-Maia; doctors Moysés Paciornik, Erasto Gaertner, César Pernetta, and Atlândido Borba Côrtes; educators Anízio Alves da Silva, Sebastião Paraná, and Júlia Wanderley; philosophers Mario Sergio Cortella, Oswaldo Giacóia, and Roberto Romano; journalists Fábio Campana, Teresa Urban, and Aramis Millarch; politicians and former governors Roberto Requião de Mello e Silva, Moisés Lupion, and Jaime Lerner; athletes Vanderlei Cordeiro de Lima, Gilberto Amauri Godoy Filho, Natália Falavigna, footballers Deivid Willian da Silva, and Dirceu José Guimarães; singers Michel Teló; duos Nhô Belarmino and Nhá Gabriela; Chitãozinho and Xororó; and Jads and Jadson; actresses Sônia Braga, Lala Schneider, Grazi Massafera, Maria Fernanda Cândido; and actors Tony Ramos, Ary Fontoura, and Mário Schoemberger.

== Paranist movement and the search for cultural identity ==
The political emancipation of Paraná in 1853 established the Province of Paraná. At that time, the region was predominantly rural, with agriculture and livestock as the economic foundation, and few cultural representations were distinctly associated with Paraná due to its sparse population. Prominent symbols included biological elements such as araucaria trees and pine nuts, and biogeographical features such as the Campos Gerais,, plateaus, sandstones, rivers, and Iguazu Falls. Stories often centered on settlers, tropeiros, and indigenous peoples.

After the establishment of the Republic in 1889, a national movement aimed to define Brazilian identity. In Paraná, this was driven by the economic growth from yerba mate and prospects of fertile land for modernization. In 1900, the Historical and Geographical Institute of Paraná was founded to create a regional history incorporating all ethnic groups.

In 1906, poet Domingos Nascimento referred to Paulistas in northern Paraná as “Paranistas.” In 1927, the term “Paranismo” was formalized in a manifesto by Romário Martins, marking the start of the Paranist Movement, which aimed to foster a sense of belonging among residents during a period of significant immigration. The magazine Ilustração Paranaense, directed by João Batista Grofft, was created in 1927 to promote the movement and economic development, circulating until 1930.

Paranist is anyone who holds a sincere affection for Paraná and notably demonstrates it in any dignified activity that benefits the Paraná community. [...] Paranist is one who, on Paraná's lands, tilled a field, cleared a forest, built a bridge, constructed a machine, managed a factory, composed a verse, painted a picture, sculpted a statue, drafted a liberal law, practiced kindness, enlightened a mind, prevented an injustice, educated a sentiment, reformed a wrongdoer, wrote a book, planted a tree

— Romário Martins in: Paranística. In: A Divulgação. Curitiba 1946, p. 91.

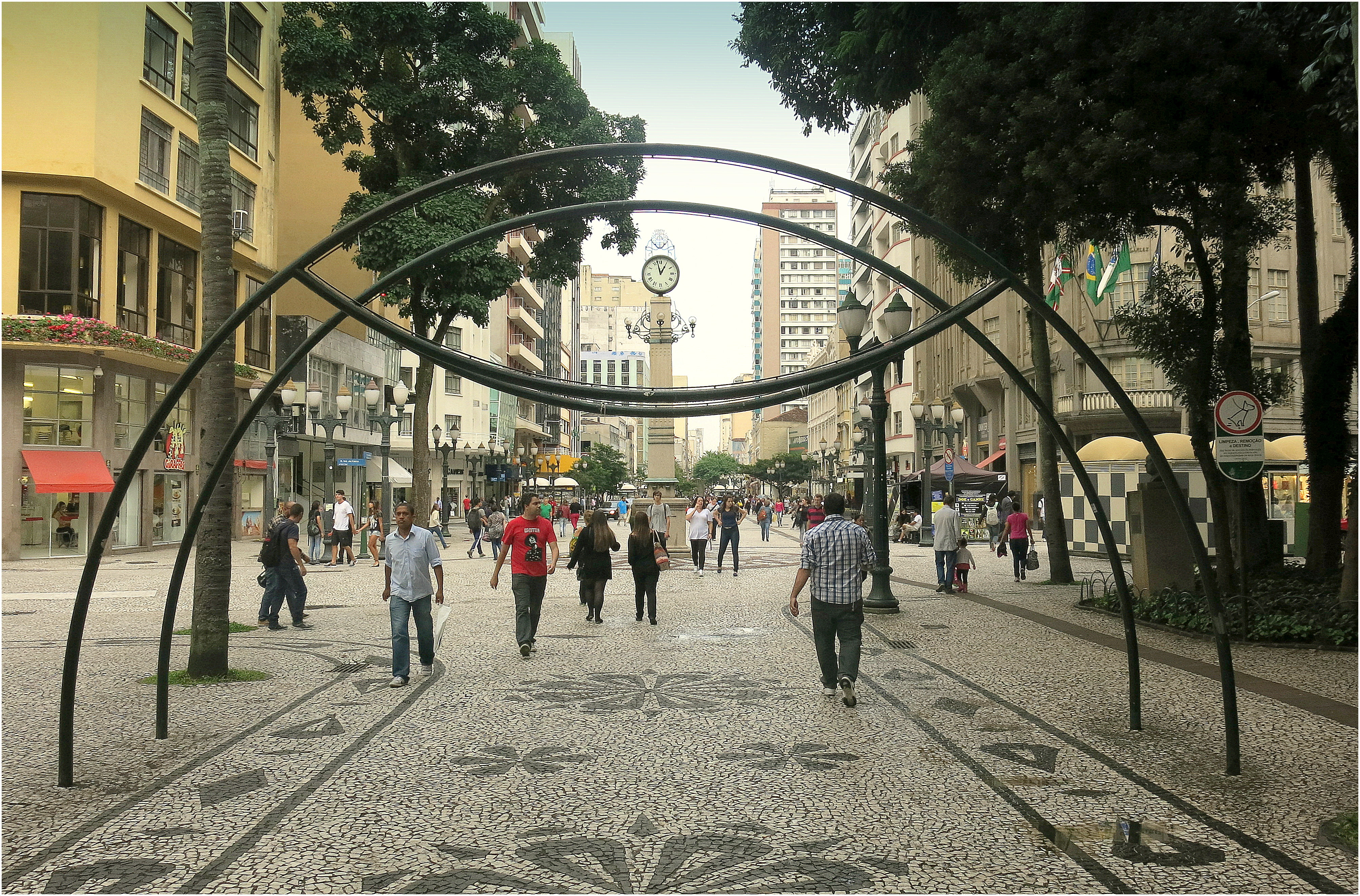
Pine nut-shaped designs on the sidewalks of Rua XV de Novembro in Curitiba, a legacy of the Paranist Movement.

The Paranist Movement contributed to constructing a regional identity for Paraná, with intellectuals, artists, and writers promoting stories and traditions centered on indigenous symbols such as the pine tree, yerba mate, and the landscape. Critics note that the movement emphasized a “white and European” identity, often overlooking the contributions of African and impoverished European settlers, and portraying indigenous peoples as “noble savages” while underrepresenting the significant economic and cultural roles of Black and mixed-race individuals. The movement influenced cultural aspects such as literature and architecture, with examples such as the Portuguese pavement sidewalks in Curitiba featuring pine tree and pine nut patterns. Key figures included Romário Martins, Guido Viaro, João Turin, Theodoro de Bona, Zaco Paraná, Lange de Morretes, and João Ghelfi.

== Legends and mysticism ==
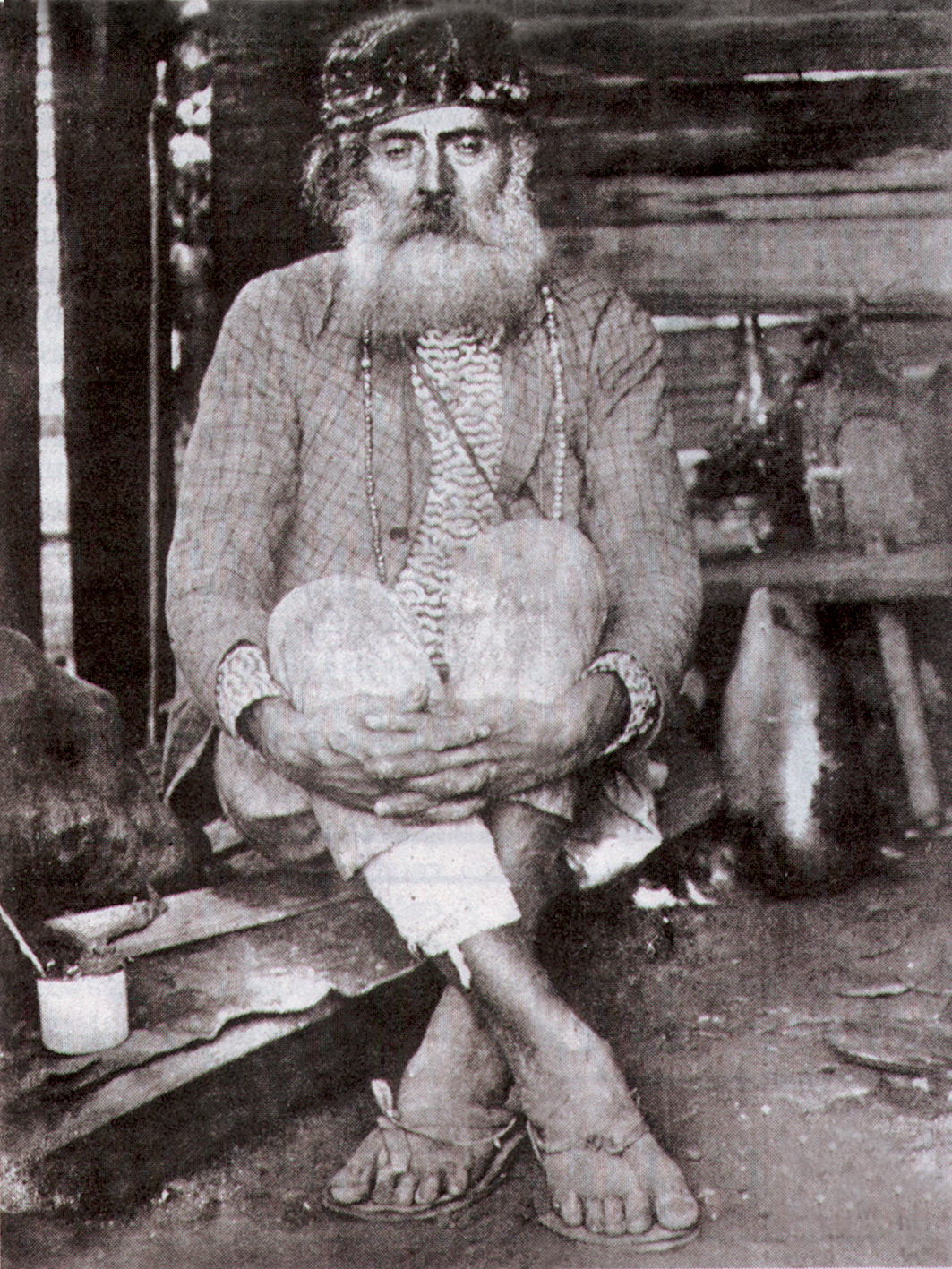
João Maria, a figure in Paraná's folklore.

Paraná's legends are rooted in indigenous mythology, blended with European and African influences, and were documented by travelers during the colonial period, gaining academic attention in the 20th century, partly through the Paranist Movement. These stories reflect individual and collective experiences, addressing themes such as religion, hauntings, miracles, cemeteries, and hidden treasures.

Notable legends include the Legend of the Wild Roses, the Legend of the Araucaria and the Azure Jay, the Legend of Yerba Mate, the Legend of the Iguazu Falls, the Legend of Vila Velha, the Legend of Our Lady of Light, the Legend of the Enchanted Grotto, the Legend of Ana Bege, and legends surrounding the monk João Maria. Popular superstitions include those of Maria Bueno in Curitiba, Corina Portugal in Ponta Grossa, the Saint of the Wall in Jaguariaíva, and the Saint Pastorina in Tibagi.

== Cuisine ==
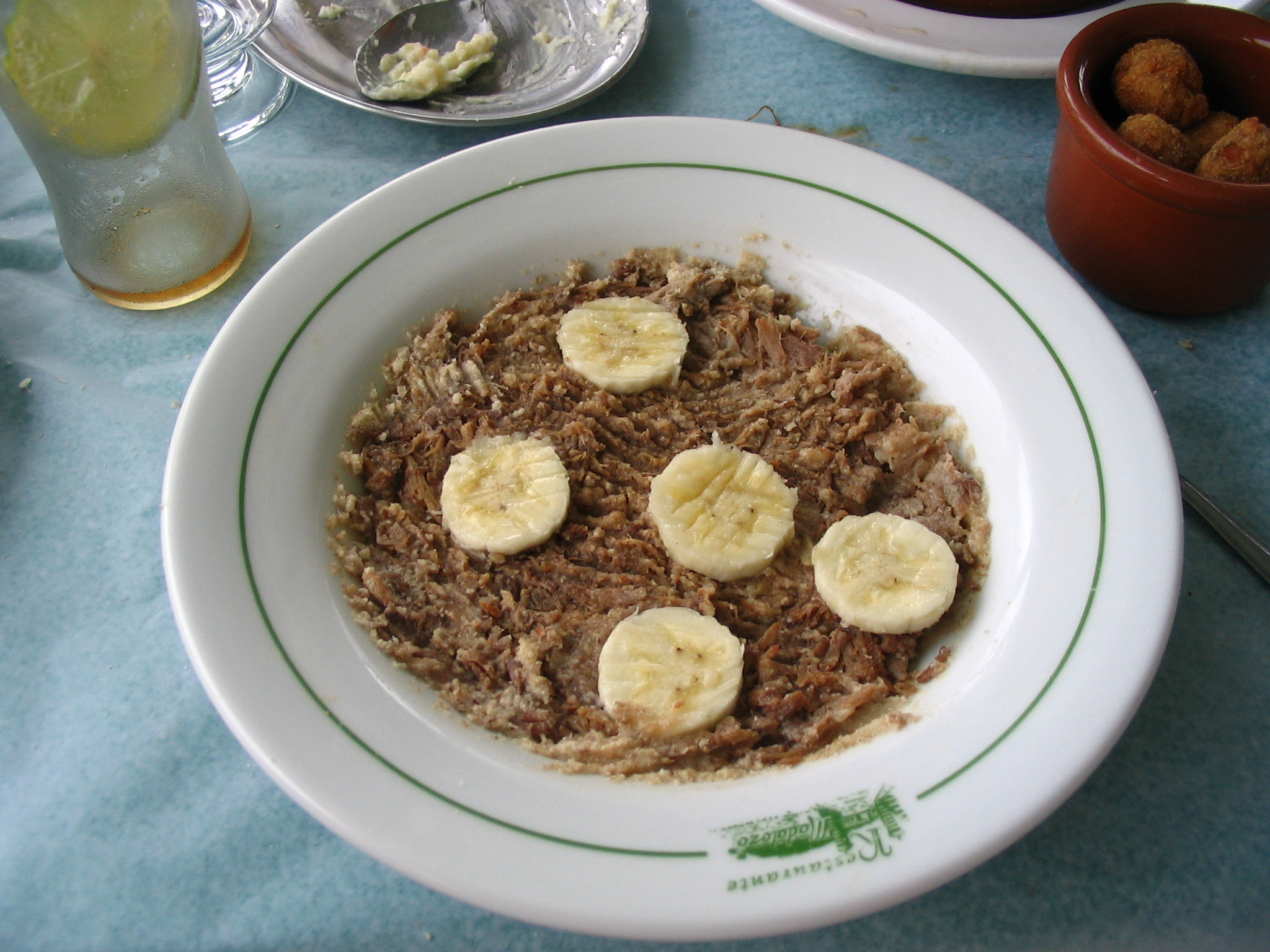
A barreado dish served on a porcelain plate.

Paraná's cuisine includes regional food preparation techniques and traditions such as jerky, churrasco, barreado, pine nuts, and influences from Rio Grande do Sul, São Paulo, Minas Gerais, and immigrant communities. Daily meals typically include breakfast with milk coffee, bread, fruits, cakes, and sweets; lunch with rice, beans, pasta, animal protein, and salad; and varied local dishes for dinner. Barreado, originating from Azorean influence, is a prominent dish. Common beverages include chimarrão, coffee, cachaça, wine, and beer.

Regional culinary variations exist across Paraná's 399 municipalities. In Curitiba, notable dishes include barreado, pine nut, and carne de onça. Coastal areas feature Azorean and caiçara cuisine. In the southern region and Campos Gerais, rustic comida tropeira includes dishes such as entrevero de pinhão and quirera com carne de porco. Italian, German, Dutch, Slavic, Spanish, Paraguayan, Arab, and Japanese cuisines are also present in various regions.

== Clothing ==
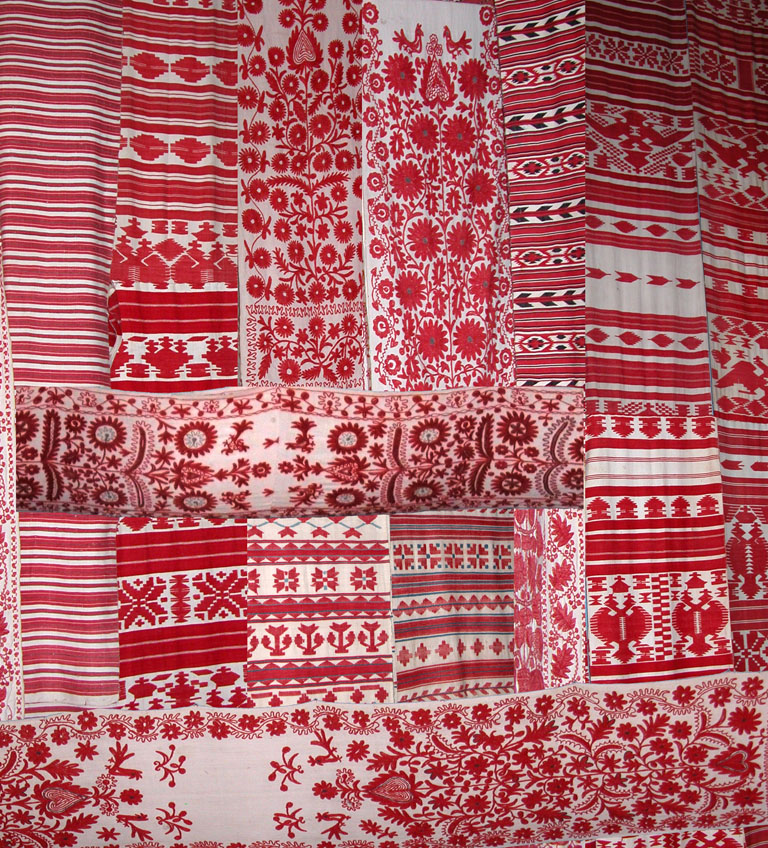
Ukrainian embroideries found in Paraná.

Clothing in Paraná reflects sociocultural habits and customs, integrating garments into political, economic, and sociological contexts. Although the state lacks an official traditional costume, distinctive outfits include those of the coastal caiçaras, the tropeiros of Campos Gerais, and the gaúchos of the western region.

Clothing production reflects ethnic diversity, with influences from Indigenous, Portuguese, African, European, Arab, and Asian cultures, showing a strong Eurocentric tradition. Traditional outfits include those of ethnic and folkloric groups such as gaúchos, tropeiros, and caipiras, featuring Iberian-influenced items such as bombachas, boots, chiripás, guaiacas, palas, pilchas, ponchos, vestidos de prendas, ribbons, embroidery, scarves, belts, buckles, hats, and berets. Indigenous, Portuguese, African, Italian, Slavic, Germanic, Asian, and Arab influences are evident across various regions.

== Architecture ==
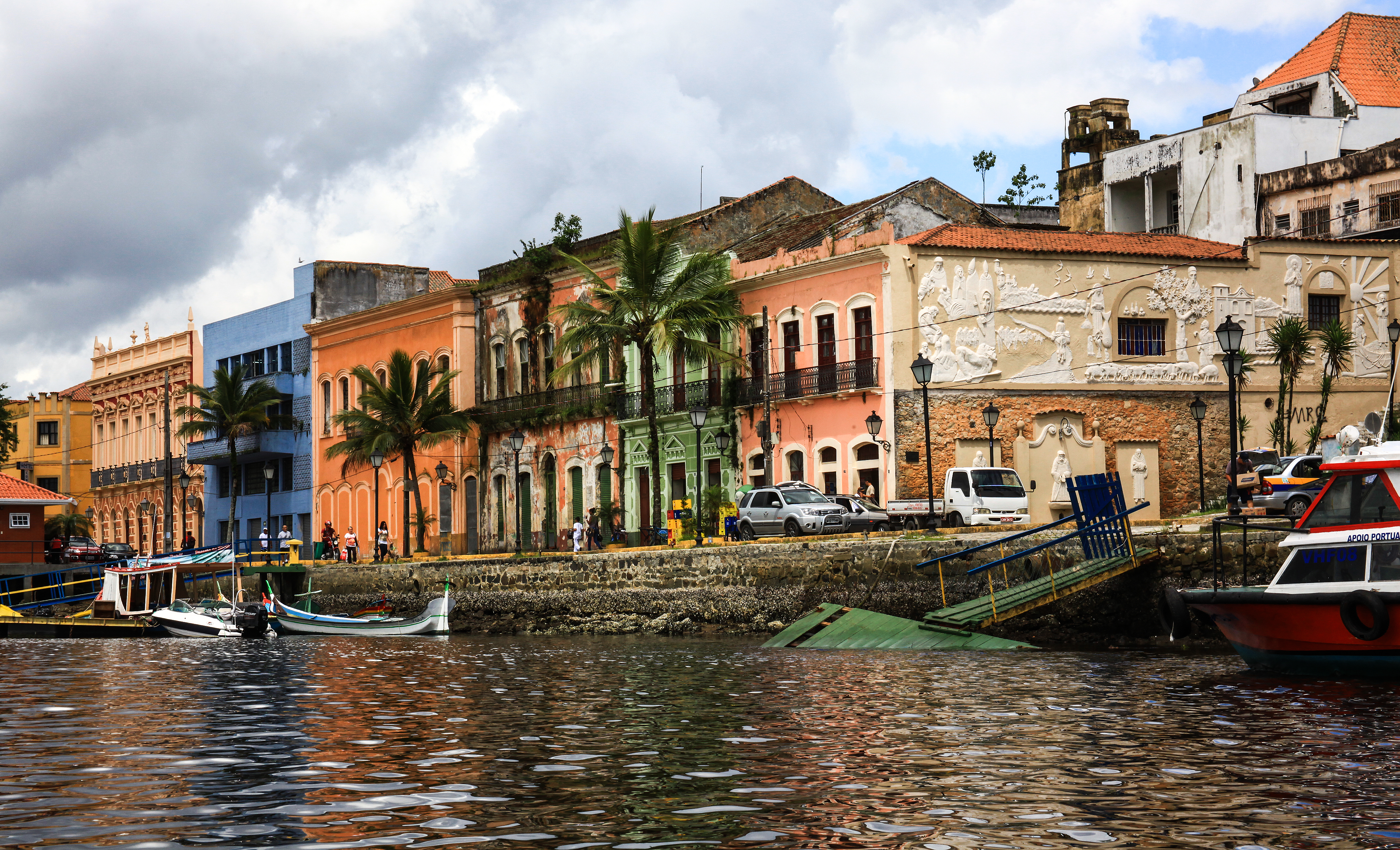
Architectural and urban ensemble of the historic center of Paranaguá.

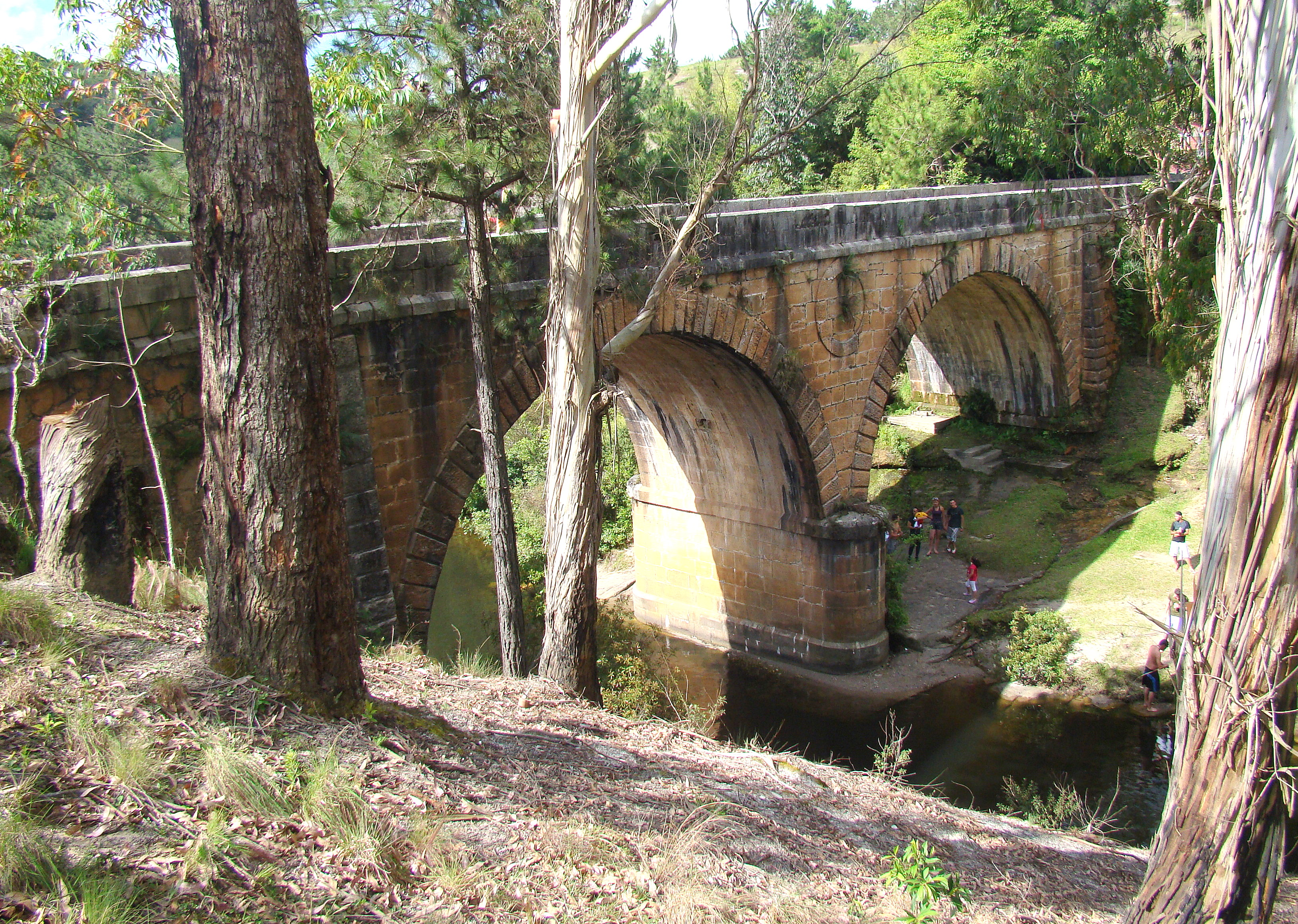
Historic bridge over the Dos Papagaios River, between Palmeira and Balsa Nova.

Paraná's architecture reflects historical and cultural influences. Early constructions showcase European styles, including eclectic, neoclassical, colonial, oriental, Byzantine, modern, and minimalist.

In Curitiba, notable buildings include the classical Castelo do Batel, influenced by Loire Valley castles, and the eclectic Paço Municipal with Art Nouveau elements, a listed heritage site. Ukrainian architecture is prominent in churches, and lambrequins are a legacy of immigrant craftsmanship. Modern structures include the Oscar Niemeyer Museum in Curitiba. The municipality of Lapa preserves religious buildings, theaters, museums, and residences, while Paranaguá and Antonina feature Brazilian colonial architecture.

Architects such as Jaime Lerner, Romeu Paulo da Costa, Vilanova Artigas, Ayrton Lolô Cornelsen, Eligson Ribeiro Gomes, Rubens Meister, and Frederico Kirchgässner have contributed to Paraná's architectural landscape.

== Languages, dialects, and literature ==
Portuguese is the official language in Paraná, influenced by African and Indigenous languages. Indigenous languages such as Kaingang, Xetá, and Guarani (including Mbyá and Nhandeva) are preserved in villages such as Ortigueira and Laranjeiras do Sul. Spanish was spoken in northern and western regions during early colonization. Following the Treaty of Madrid in 1750, Brazilian influence grew, especially after 1870 in the Guayrá region.

Immigrants from the 19th century onward, including those from São Paulo, Minas Gerais, Rio Grande do Sul, Santa Catarina, and the Northeast, influenced linguistic patterns. The Linguistic Atlas of Paraná identifies variations in Portuguese, with a pronounced “E” in Curitiba, Campos Gerais, and southern regions, and a “caipira R” in northern areas. Coastal speech is termed “parnanguara” or “caiçara.” Brazilian Sign Language (Libras) is also recognized.

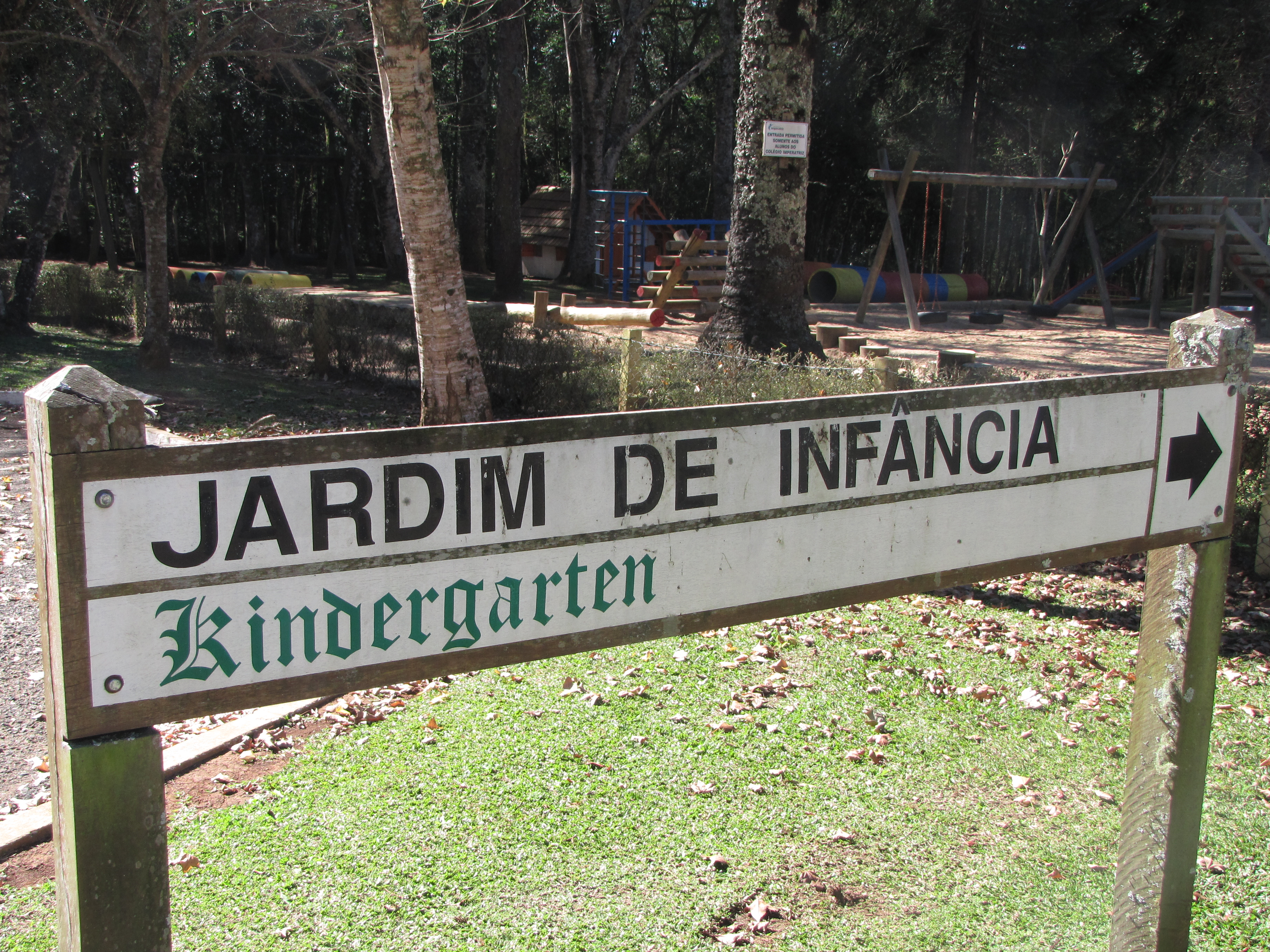
Bilingual Portuguese and German signage for a kindergarten in Entre Rios, Guarapuava.

European colonization significantly shaped the speech patterns of Paraná residents across various municipalities. In the interior, "colonist accents" are prevalent, particularly among descendants of Germans, Ukrainians, and Poles. Many families in colonies maintain their ancestral languages, including German, Polish, Ukrainian, Italian, Dutch, and Japanese, alongside smaller communities preserving Russian and Arabic. Some schools provide instruction in these languages.

In the field of dialectology, Paraná features at least two dialects: the Southern dialect and the Caipira dialect. These differ from the Florianopolitan dialect, Gaúcho dialect, and Paulistano dialect. Paraná's dialects exhibit characteristics such as vowel reduction and vowel harmony in mid vowels in pretonic positions, with variations between closed and open mid vowels. Nasal consonants at syllable ends (except for the unstressed -am ending, sometimes pronounced as -ão) and the pronunciation of the vowel “e” at word endings as /e/ (unlike the /i/ common in most of Brazil) are notable. For instance, quente is pronounced /ʹkente/ rather than /ʹkẽti/, /ʹkẽʧ/, or /ʹkẽjʧ/.

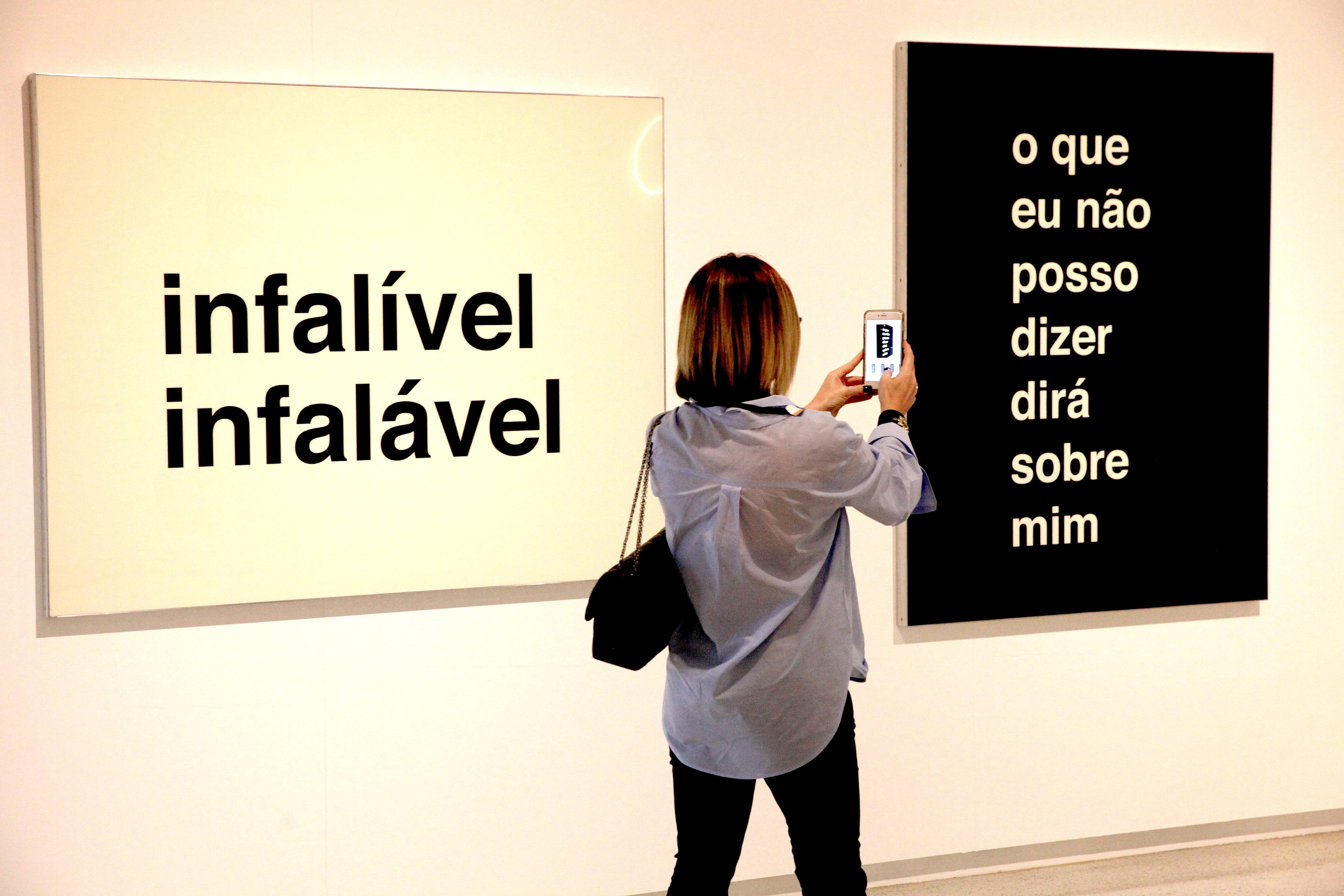
Curitiba International Biennial, a contemporary art event that features literary activities and artists who engage with visual poetry.

Paraná's literature is often seen as less distinctly tied to the state's identity compared to other cultural elements. Many works by Paraná authors focus on themes unrelated to the state's people, territory, or culture, prompting critique from some literary figures.

Potential sources for Paraná's literature include the araucarias, the region Campos Gerais, local myths and stories, historical events, and figures such as the tropeiro, who contributed to founding many municipalities in the state. Despite a limited number of regionalist works, Paraná has produced notable figures in national artistic movements such as Modernism, Symbolism, and Parnassianism, though these lack major prominence in Brazil's broader literary history. Print journalism has played a significant role in promoting Paraná's literary and cultural space, extending beyond mere news reporting. Newspapers such as Folha de Londrina, Tribuna do Paraná, Tribuna do Norte, Diário Popular, Gazeta do Iguaçu, Diário dos Campos, Jornal do Oeste, Gazeta do Povo, and Rascunho, which specializes in literature, are among those published in the state. The Press Office of the Federal University of Paraná publishes educational, technical, and scientific books, theses, journals, periodicals, and various printed materials for the university's sectors, courses, departments, and faculty members.

Literary institutions in Paraná include the Paraná Academy of Letters, Paraná Literary Center, Academy of Letters of Campos Gerais, and Paraná Women's Cultural Center. Prominent Paraná authors include Dalton Trevisan, Paulo Leminski, Alice Ruiz, Emiliano Perneta, Emílio de Meneses, Andrade Muricy, Tasso da Silveira, coastal writers Nestor Vítor and Silveira Neto, Campos Gerais natives Helena Kolody and Noel Nascimento, and Londrina's Domingos Pellegrini. New literary works are emerging through initiatives such as literary contests and festivals, with the Paraná Literature Prize, established by the state government, recognizing unpublished works from authors across Brazil.

== Visual arts and crafts ==
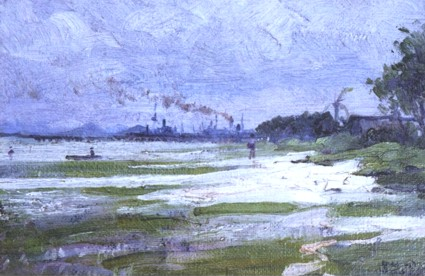
Paranaguá Port in the late 19th century, by Alfredo Andersen.

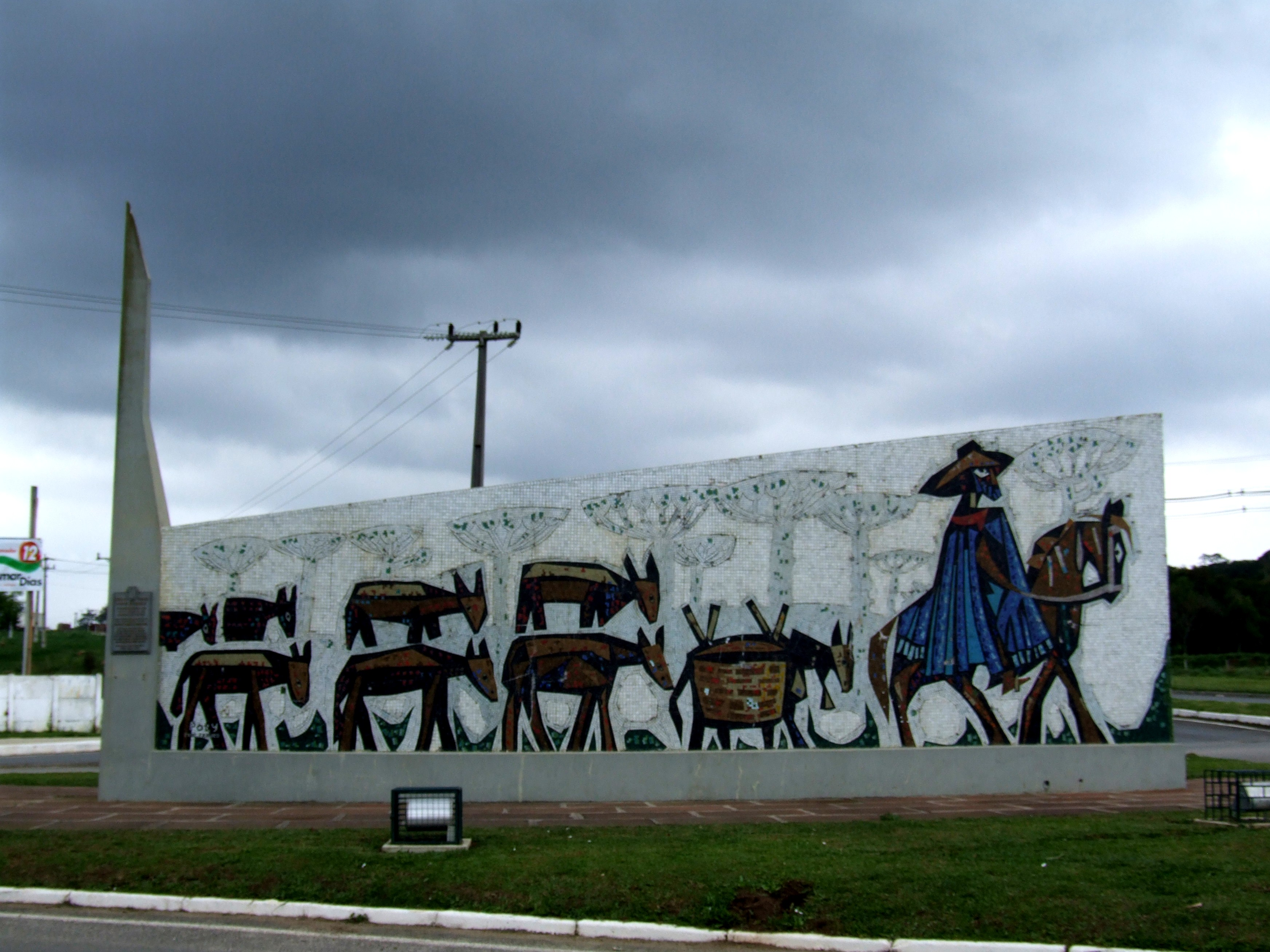
Mosaic by Poty Lazzarotto, at the Tropeiro Monument, in Lapa.

The earliest iconographic image of Curitiba is an 1827 painting by Jean-Baptiste Debret, created during his travels with the French Artistic Mission from 1816 to 1831. Paraná's society began organizing in the mid-19th century, fostering the development of the arts. Iria Correa, born in Paranaguá, gained recognition by exhibiting her works in 1866. In Curitiba, art schools were introduced by Portuguese artist Mariano de Lima and Norwegian Alfredo Andersen, known as the “father” of Paraná painting, marking the emergence of the state's visual arts.

The Paraná Museum, established in 1876 as Brazil's third oldest, preserves the state's history through paintings and historical objects, including works by Paraná-born painters. The Oscar Niemeyer Museum, one of Latin America's largest, houses works by artists such as Guido Viaro, Miguel Bakun, Alfredo Andersen, Tarsila do Amaral, and Cândido Portinari. Other spaces for visual arts include Casa Andrade Muricy, Solar do Rosário, Curitiba Memorial, the School of Music and Fine Arts of Paraná, and the Paraná Secretariat of Culture.

Crafts in Paraná reflect Italian, German, Polish, Portuguese, and Indigenous influences, featuring braided items, hammocks, baskets, and wooden objects using Italian techniques, often depicting colonization stories and local landscapes with araucaria and yerba mate as key elements. Indigenous crafts include ceramics, basketry, musical instruments, adornments, ritual masks, feather art, and utilitarian objects, still practiced in the state's interior.

Notable artists include Theodoro De Bona, Frederico Lange de Morretes, Arthur Nísio, João Ghelfi, Nilo Previdi, Poty Lazzarotto, Oswald Lopes, Paul Garfunkel, Alice Yamamura, and Antonio Petrek.

== Dance and music ==
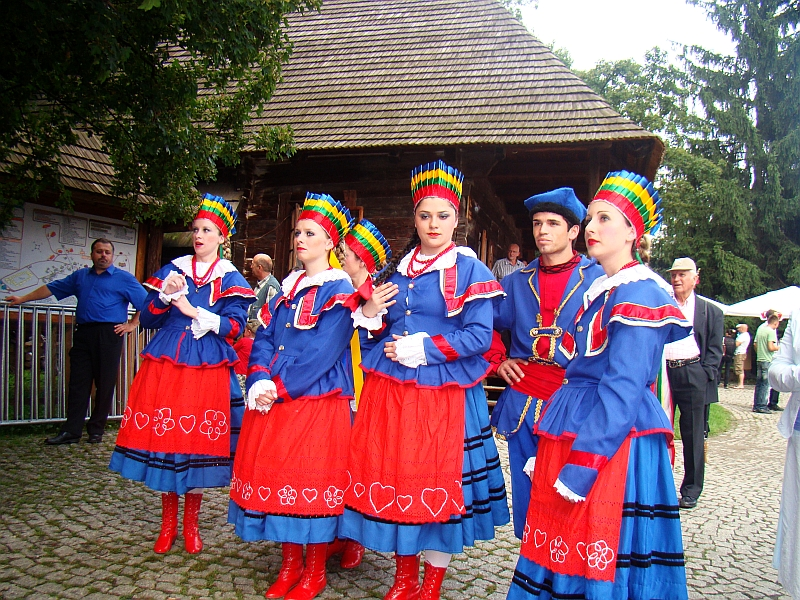
Polish Folk Group of Araucária.

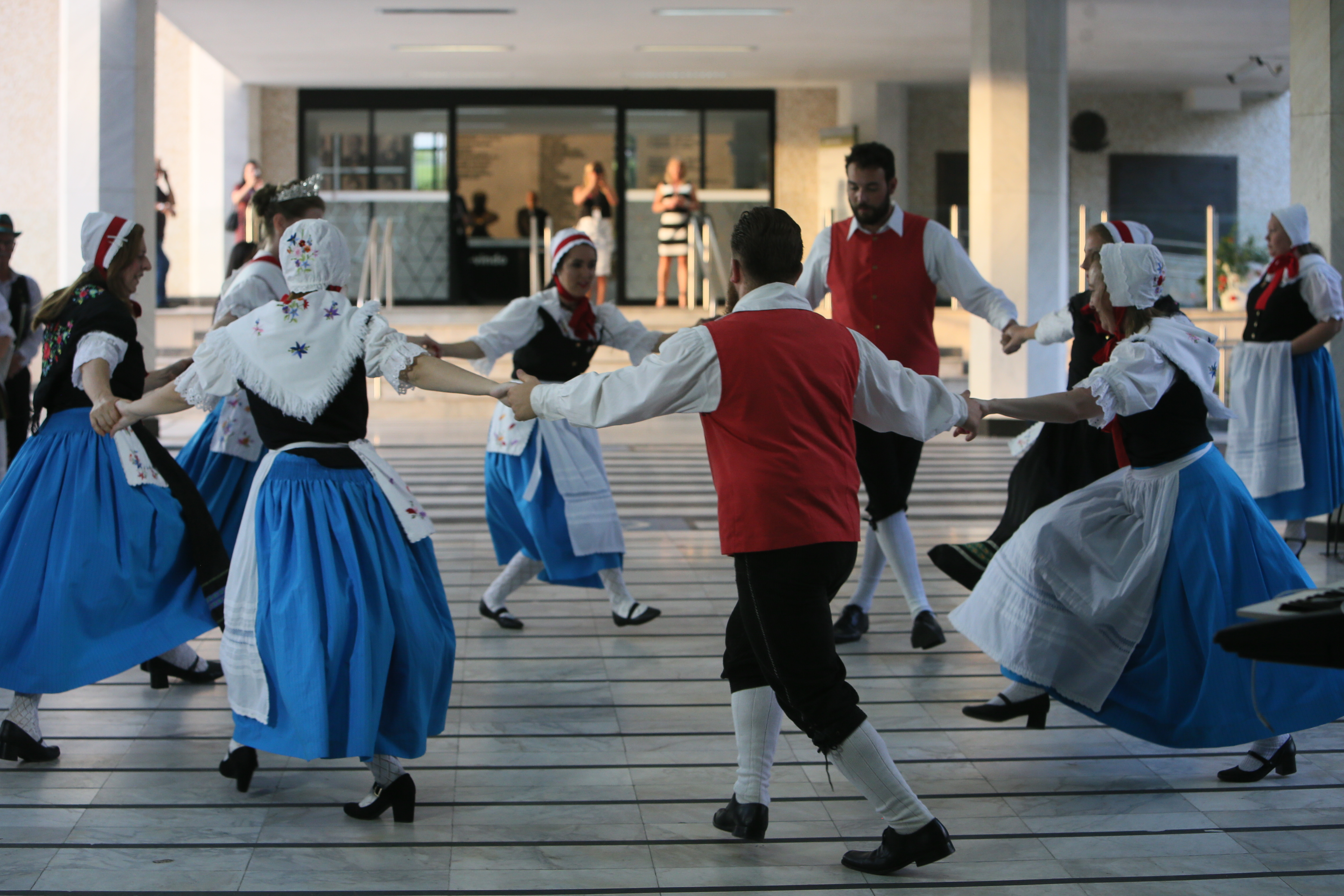
Typical German dance in Paraná.

Rural communities in Paraná perform various folk dances, including the curitibano, pair circle dance, maypole dance, waltz, quebra-mana, and nhô-chico on the coast. Communities of European origin preserve the dances, songs, and costumes of their ancestral countries. Paraná's dance and music culture includes children's games such as nursery rhymes and the Caipira guitar. Many dances incorporate tap dancing, circle dancing, singing, and clapping.

Cultural manifestations reflect European heritage through fandango, boi-de-mamão, congadas, the Saint Gundisalvus Dance, Whitsun, the folia de reis, and the cavalhadas.

Fandango was introduced to the Paraná coast by Azorean settlers in 1750. Practiced during the entrudo, a carnival precursor, by Azoreans, enslaved people, and indigenous communities, it was accompanied by the region's typical dish, barreado. Dancers, called "folgadores" or "folgadeiras," perform during leisure time from Saturday to Sunday, with choreographies such as Andorinha, Xarazinho, and Tonta, accompanied by two violas, a fiddle, and the maxixe. Men wear boots or clogs while dancing to rhythmic beats. The choreography includes waltzing, dragging the feet, and tapping steps accompanied by clapping. The Morretes fandango, notable for its medieval-like musical scale, is recognized by the National Institute of Historic and Artistic Heritage (IPHAN) as intangible cultural heritage.

Boi-de-mamão, a dramatic performance of European origin featuring characters and animals, focuses on the death and resurrection of an ox, known as Bumba-meu-Boi in the Northeast and Boi-Bumbá in the North. Characters include Mateus, Vaqueiro, Doutor, Benzedeiras, Maricota, Cavalinho, and the Bernunça.

The Saint Gundisalvus Dance is a religious and cultural practice introduced by the Portuguese. It involves prayer and a procession accompanied by viola music. There are also segments called marcapasso, parafuso, despotam, confissão, and casamento. In quilombola communities, it serves as a means to fulfill vows for blessings.

== Afro-Brazilian culture ==
Paraná's cultural tradition began forming in 1853 with the state's political emancipation, shaped by Paranism, which sought to create a distinct state identity based on European immigration and an idealized indigenous figure, often overlooking African contributions. Academic research has since highlighted the significant scientific, philosophical, and cultural contributions of the Black population to Paraná's development.

=== Paraná Capoeira ===
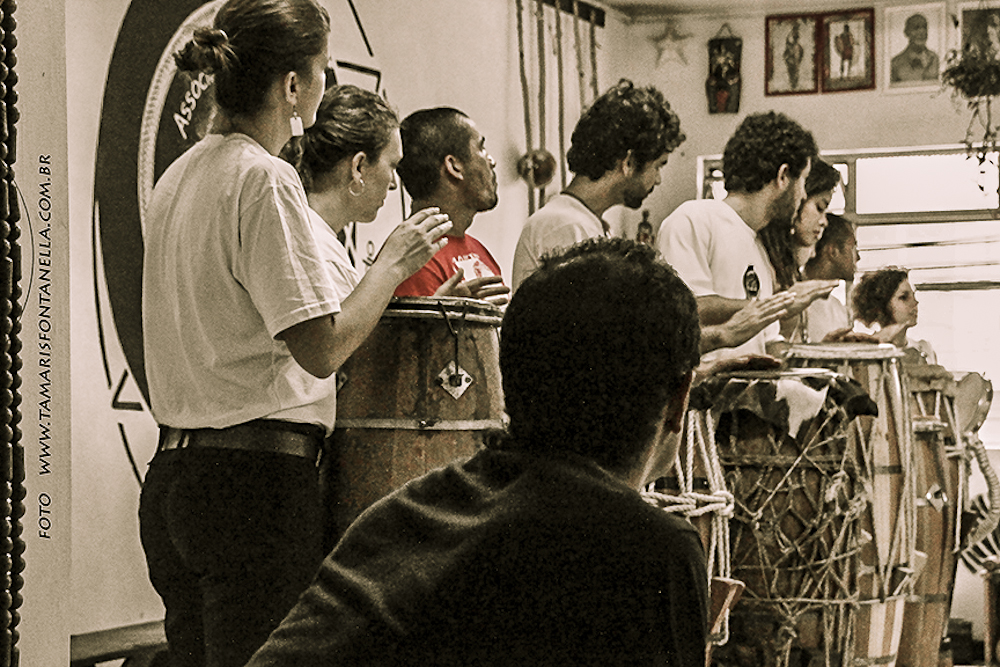
A rehearsal of a capoeira group

Capoeira, an Afro-Brazilian martial art integrating dance, music, ritual, and fighting, has been a vibrant cultural practice in Paraná since the 19th century, serving as a form of cultural resistance. Practiced in public and private spaces with the berimbau and other instruments, it is recognized as a symbol of Black identity and intangible cultural heritage. Historian Jeferson do Nascimento Machado documents capoeira in Paraná from the late 19th century. A 1899 news report describes a capoeira incident on Borges de Macedo Street, and a 1900 report notes its practice by a soldier and a woman. The Água Morna Quilombo references an ancestor, Mãe Romana, using capoeira-like skills during the Paraguay War.

Capoeira groups emerged in Curitiba in the 1970s, led by Master Sergipe and Master Burguês, spreading to cities such as Ponta Grossa, Londrina, Maringá, Imbituva, and São João do Triunfo. Notable groups include Master Burguês's Muzenza, Master Camisa's ABADÁ-CAPOEIRA, and Master Silveira's ACAPRAS.

==== List of the main capoeira masters in the state of Paraná ====
Master Sergipe (Antônio Rodrigues Santos) from Boquim-SE pioneered institutional capoeira in Paraná. His book, "The Power of Capoeira," details its introduction to Curitiba, starting with a roda at Zacarias Square in 1973. He served as FEPARCA president and founded the Brazilian Capoeira League.

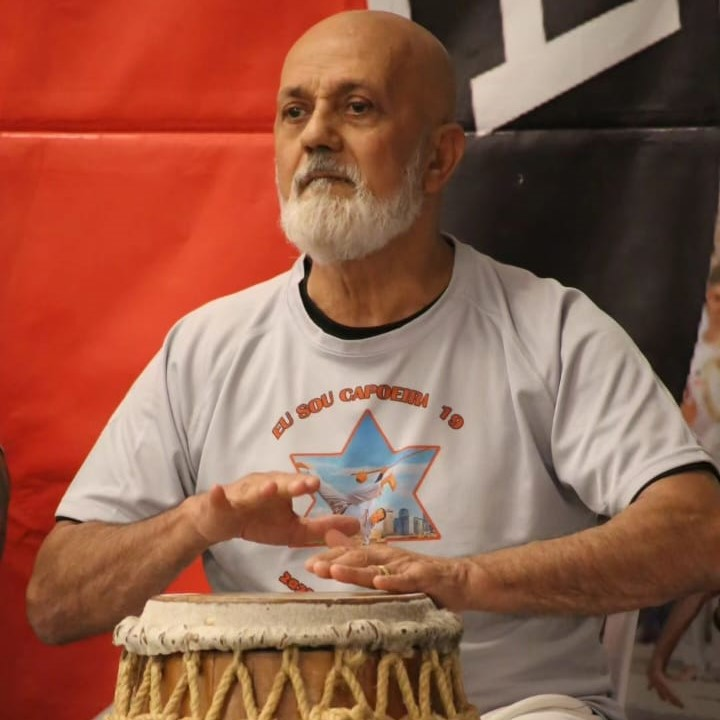
Master Burguês

Master Burguês (Antônio Carlos de Menezes), born in Laranjeiras, introduced the Muzenza group to Paraná in 1975 and founded FEPARCA in 1985. Master Silveira (Gideoni Silveira), born in Apucarana, founded ACAPRAS, active since the 1980s. Master Pop Lainy (Adilson Alves Leandro) from Minas Gerais founded the Guerreiro dos Palmares Group in Curitiba in 1998, later expanding to Campos Gerais and leading OpenBrasil.

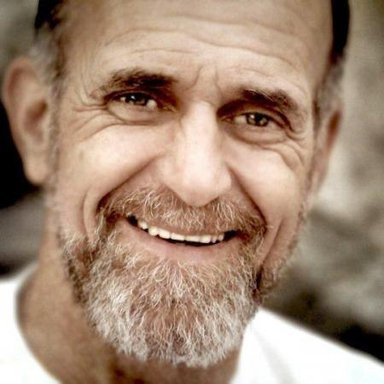
Master Camisa

Master Camisa from Chapada Diamantina, Bahia, leads ABADÁ-CAPOEIRA, active in Paraná since the 1990s.

=== Carnival ===
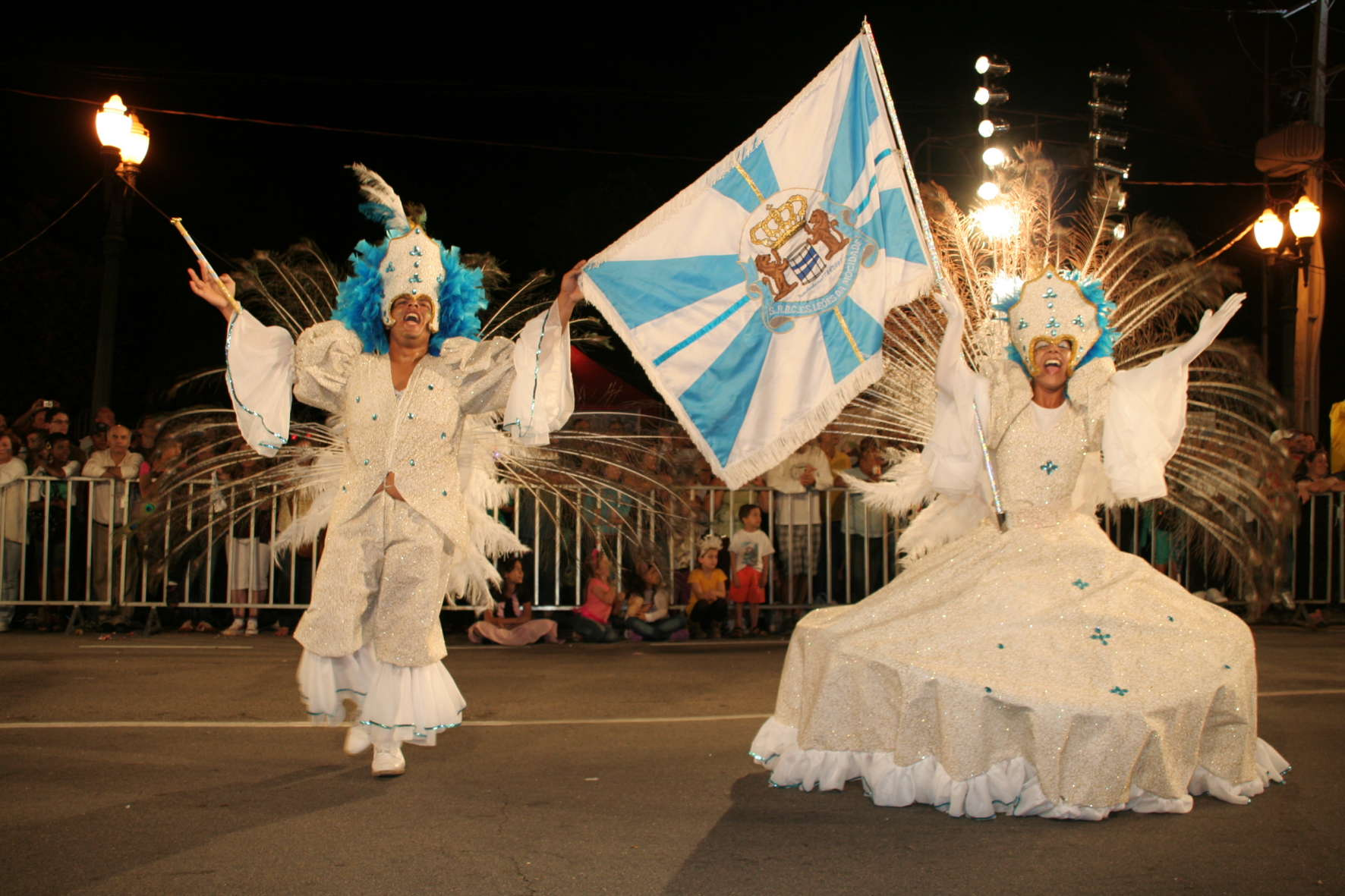
Carnival parade in Curitiba

Carnival is a traditional festival in cities such as Curitiba, Maringá, Londrina, and the Coastal and Campos Gerais regions. From the late 19th to early 20th century, it featured street games with painted faces, bright costumes, and perfumed water.

Tibagi's carnival, one of the oldest in southern Brazil, dates back to 1910 and initially involved horse-drawn carriages. By the 1950s, club-based carnivals with colorful parades emerged, organized by Clube Tibagiano and Clube Estrela da Manhã. The 1970s saw integration between Black and White communities during carnival. Since 2000, Tibagi's carnival has been held at Edmundo Mercer Square, featuring professionalized samba school parades and floats by Flor de Lis, Unidos do Nequinho, Unidos da Vila São José, and 18 de Março.

Ponta Grossa's carnival includes parades by samba schools such as Ases da Vila, Baixada Princesina, Gaviões da Beira da Linha, Globo de Cristal, Portal das Águas, Nova Princesa, and Águia de Ouro. In Antonina, the 1920-founded Boi Barroso (now Boi do Norte) and groups such as Batuqueiros do Samba, Brinca para não Chorar, Escola de Samba do Batel, Filhos da Capela, and Leões de Ouro da Caixa d'água participate in the carnival.

Curitiba's carnival features parades on Marechal Deodoro Street and the Zombie Walk, an alternative event with participants dressed as zombies.

In Maringá, carnival, part of the festive culture since the 1950s, moved from indoor venues to Getúlio Vargas Avenue in the 1970s and is now held at Vila Olímpica. Coastal carnivals in Guaratuba, Matinhos, Pontal do Paraná, and Paranaguá feature parades and samba school competitions.

== Theatre ==
Theatre in Paraná began in the early 19th century in Paranaguá, influenced by information exchange through the port, connecting people from Brazil and beyond. Initial performances occurred in non-theatrical spaces, featuring plays by Molière.

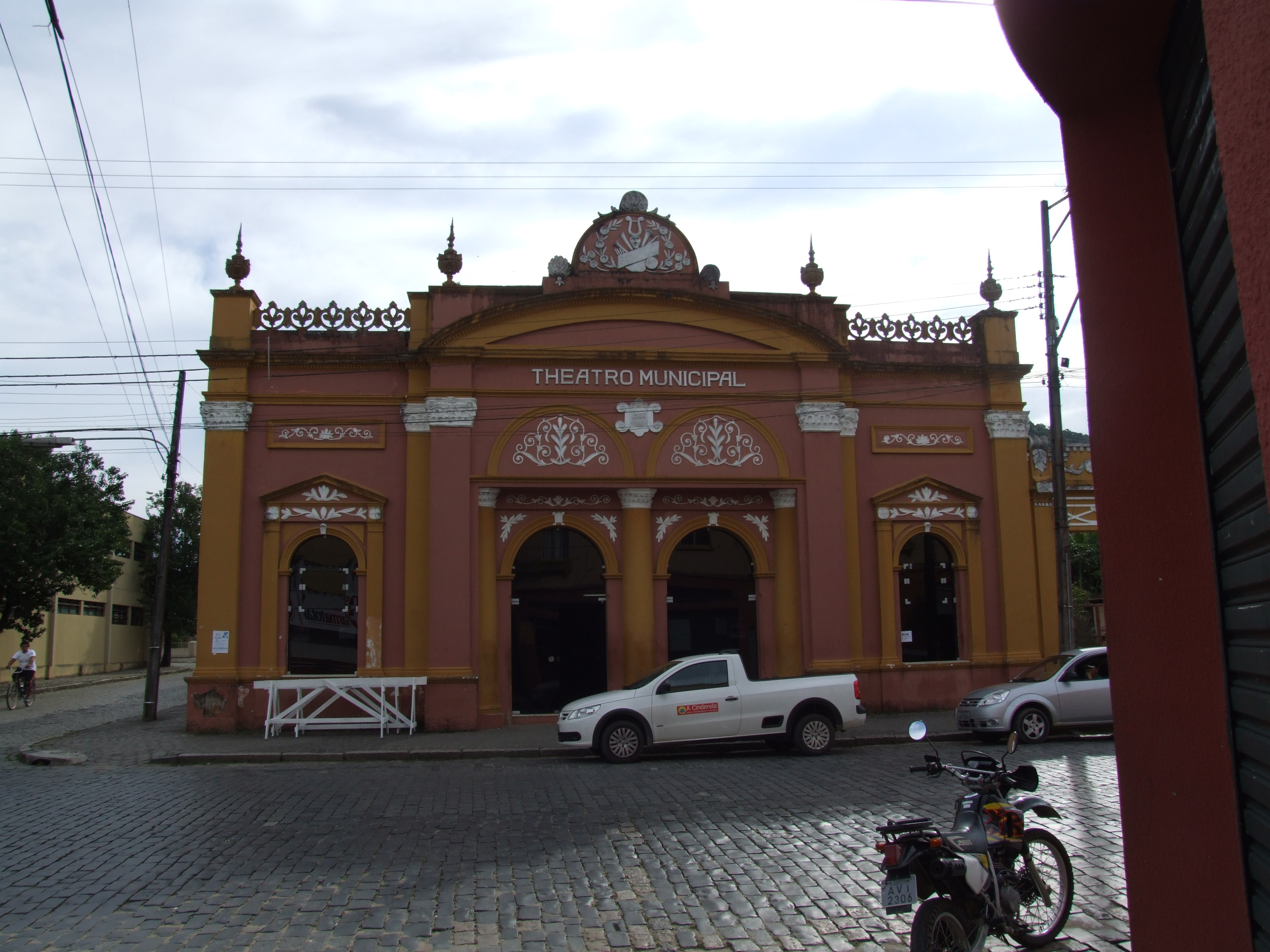
Municipal Theatre of Antonina.

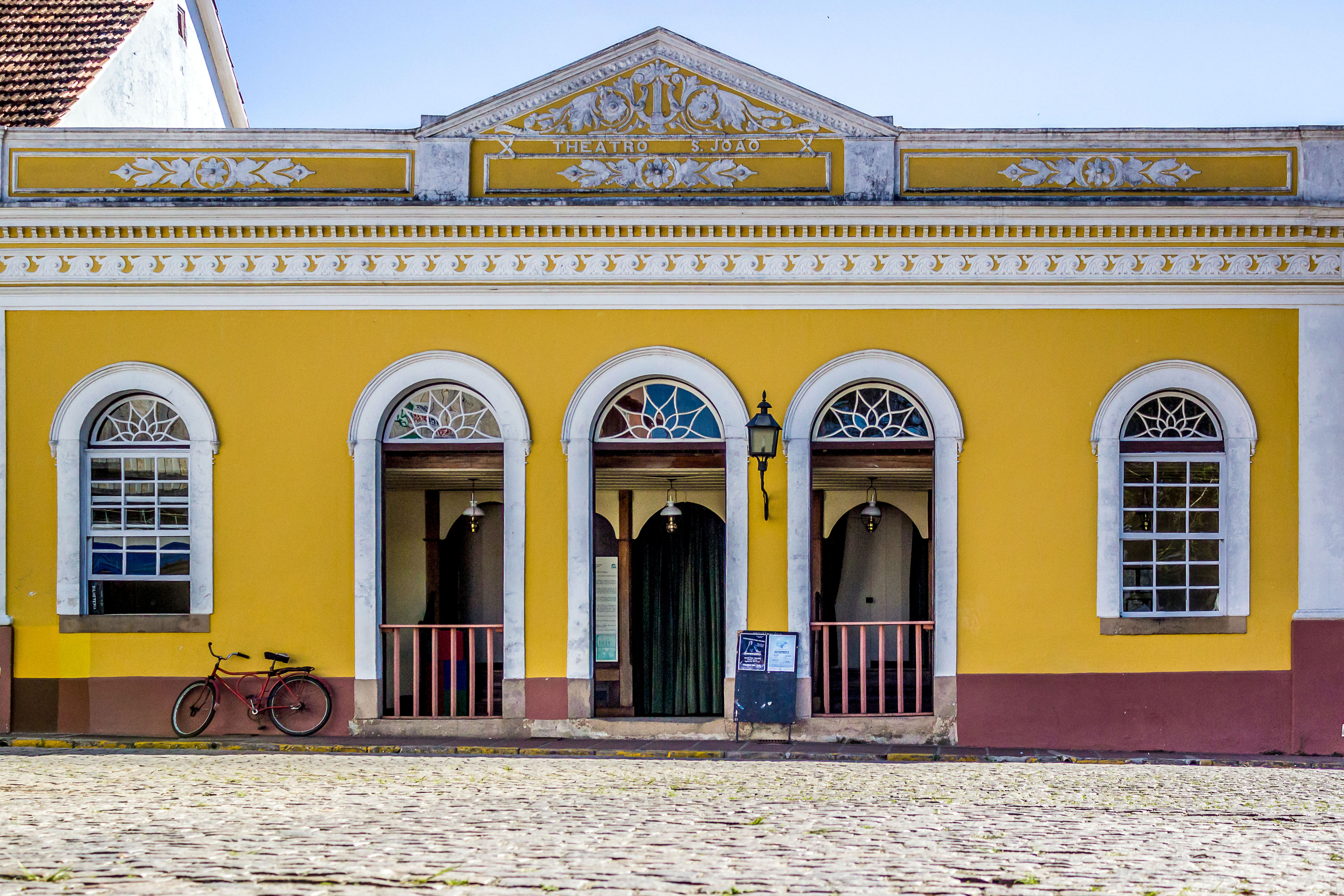
São João Theatre, inaugurated in 1876.

In 1840, the Paranaguá Theatre opened, hosting a performance for the coronation of Pedro II of Brazil in 1841 and European and Rio de Janeiro companies until 1860.

Paraná's first official theatre, São Theodoro, opened in Curitiba in 1884, was deactivated during the Federalist Revolution, reopened in 1900 as Guayrá, and, after destruction, was reinaugurated in 1974 as Guaíra, one of Latin America's largest theatres, with its Bento Munhoz da Rocha Netto auditorium seating 2,173. Curitiba also hosts venues such as the Wire Opera House, Teatro Paiol, and Positivo.

The São João Theatre in Lapa, opened in 1876, remains one of Paraná's oldest active theatres. In the countryside, Cascavel and Toledo Municipal Theatres are the largest venues. Other theatres include Cine Teatro Ouro Verde in Londrina, Cineteatro Ópera in Ponta Grossa, and Calil Haddad Theatre in Maringá.

Since 1992, Curitiba has hosted the annual Curitiba Theatre Festival, offering workshops, courses, and a variety of plays performed in theatres, streets, squares, and bars.

== Cinema ==
Paraná's first pre-Lumière film screenings occurred in Curitiba in 1897 at Teatro Hauer. Dedicated cinematograph screenings began in 1900. Early films, shot by foreign filmmakers, captured daily life, military parades, civic events, the Iguazu Falls, and the Curitiba-Paranaguá Railway. Annibal Requião was the pioneer of Paraná cinema. The filmmaker recorded the Republic's anniversary parade on 15 November 1907. Other pioneers included João Groff, José Cleto, Arthur Rogge, and Hikoma Udihara.

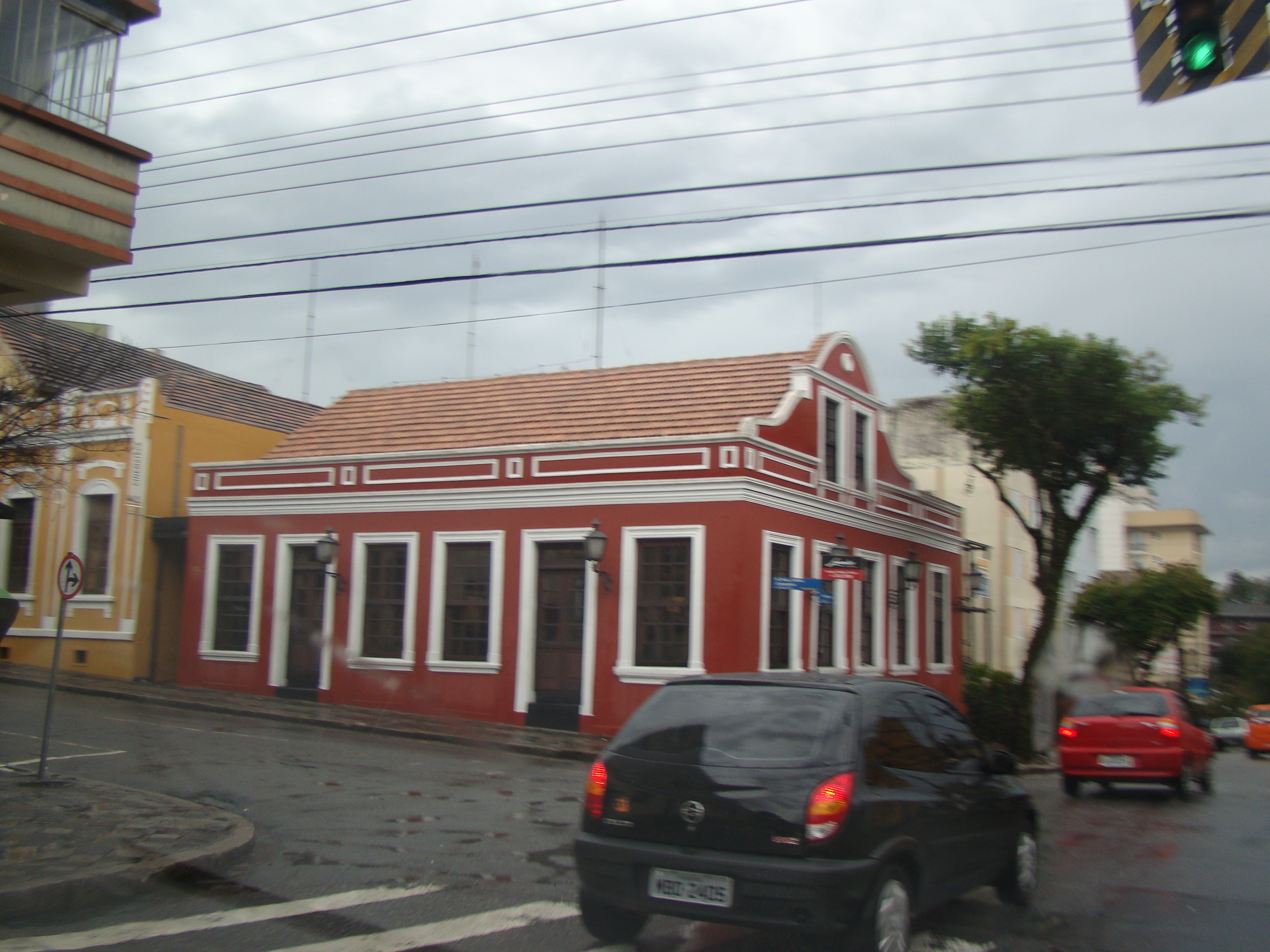
Curitiba Film Library

From the 1930s, the Paraná Press and Propaganda Department (DIP) produced state newsreels and official event recordings. In the 1940s, Eugênio Felix of the Paraná Cinematographic Company established the state's first sound laboratory and produced local newsreels for the DIP. Wladimir Kosak was notable in the 1950s, followed by Sylvio Back in the 1960s. From the 1970s, there was a significant increase in filmmakers and cinematic productions. Curitiba hosted the First Brazilian Super-8 Film Festival in 1975 and the National Super-8 Film Exhibition with support from the Curitiba Film Library. The Londrina Amateur Filmmakers Association (ALCA) was founded in 1976. In the 1980s, documentary cinema in Paraná adopted political and critical perspectives.

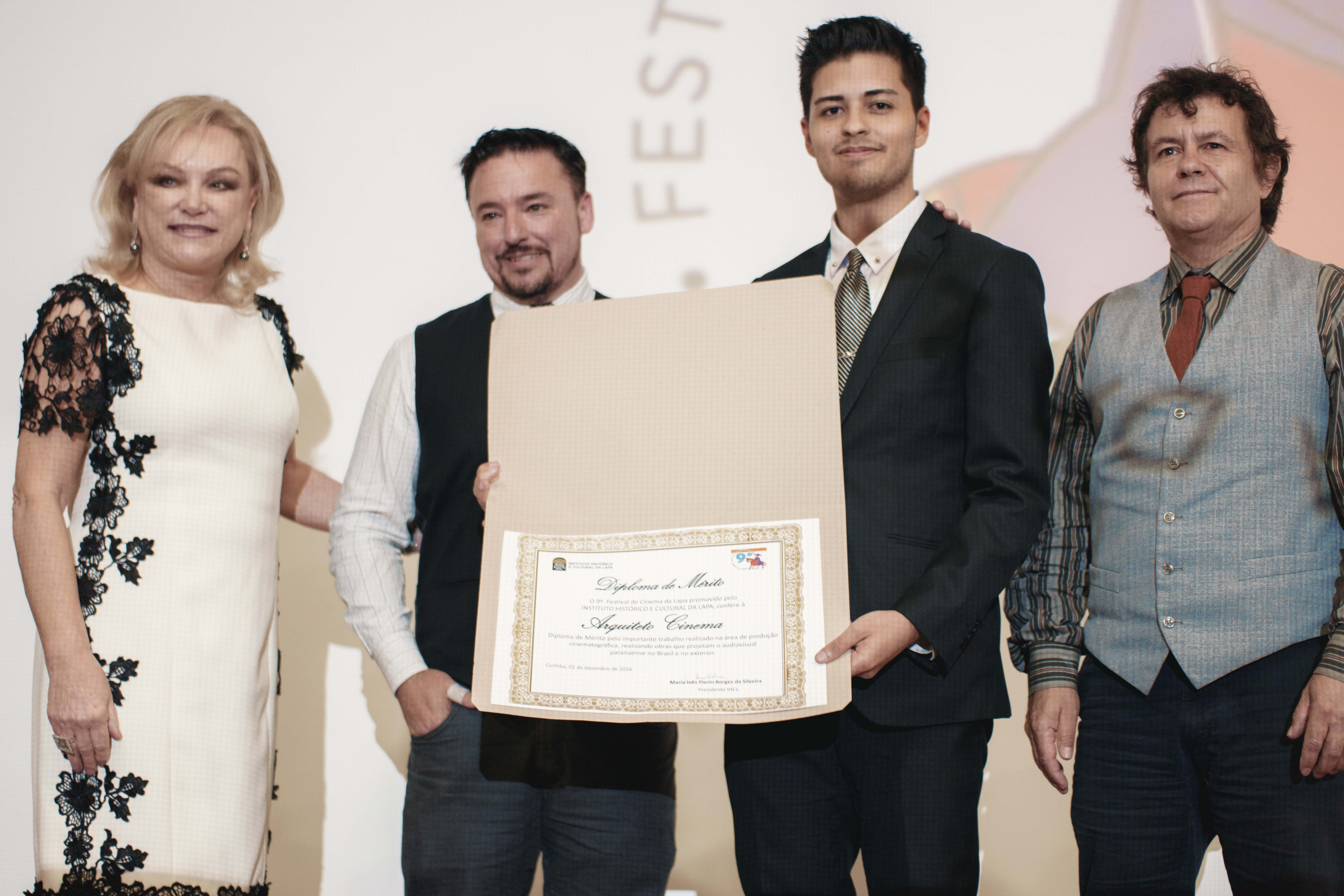
Cinema Festival in Lapa in 2016

In the 1990s, incentive laws spurred film production, with professionalization through free cinema courses such as the Academy of Cinematographic Arts - Artcine (1998), PUC Cinema Nucleus (1993), Tuiuti University's Cinema Specialization Course (1996), and Curitiba Film and Video Festival workshops (1996). These developments extended to Londrina, Maringá, Umuarama, and Cascavel. Established events include the Curitiba International Biennial Film Festival, Lapa Film Festival, Maringá Film Festival, and Londrina Film Exhibition. A 2019 survey reported 30 cities with 55 cinema complexes and 200 screening rooms, with Curitiba hosting around 81. In 2011, there were 152 screening rooms in 25 municipalities.

== Cultural heritage, institutions, and libraries ==
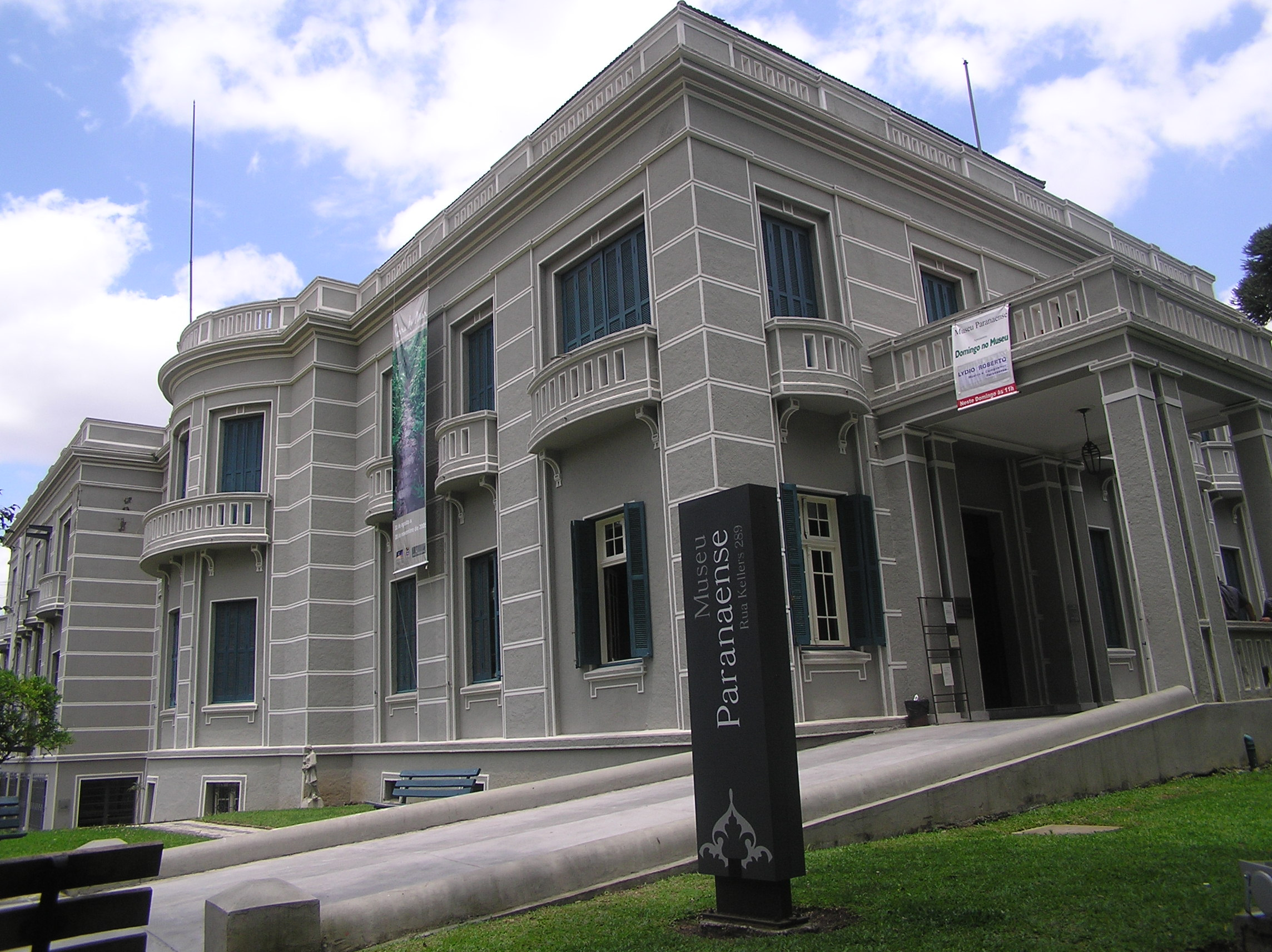
The Paraná Museum in Curitiba.

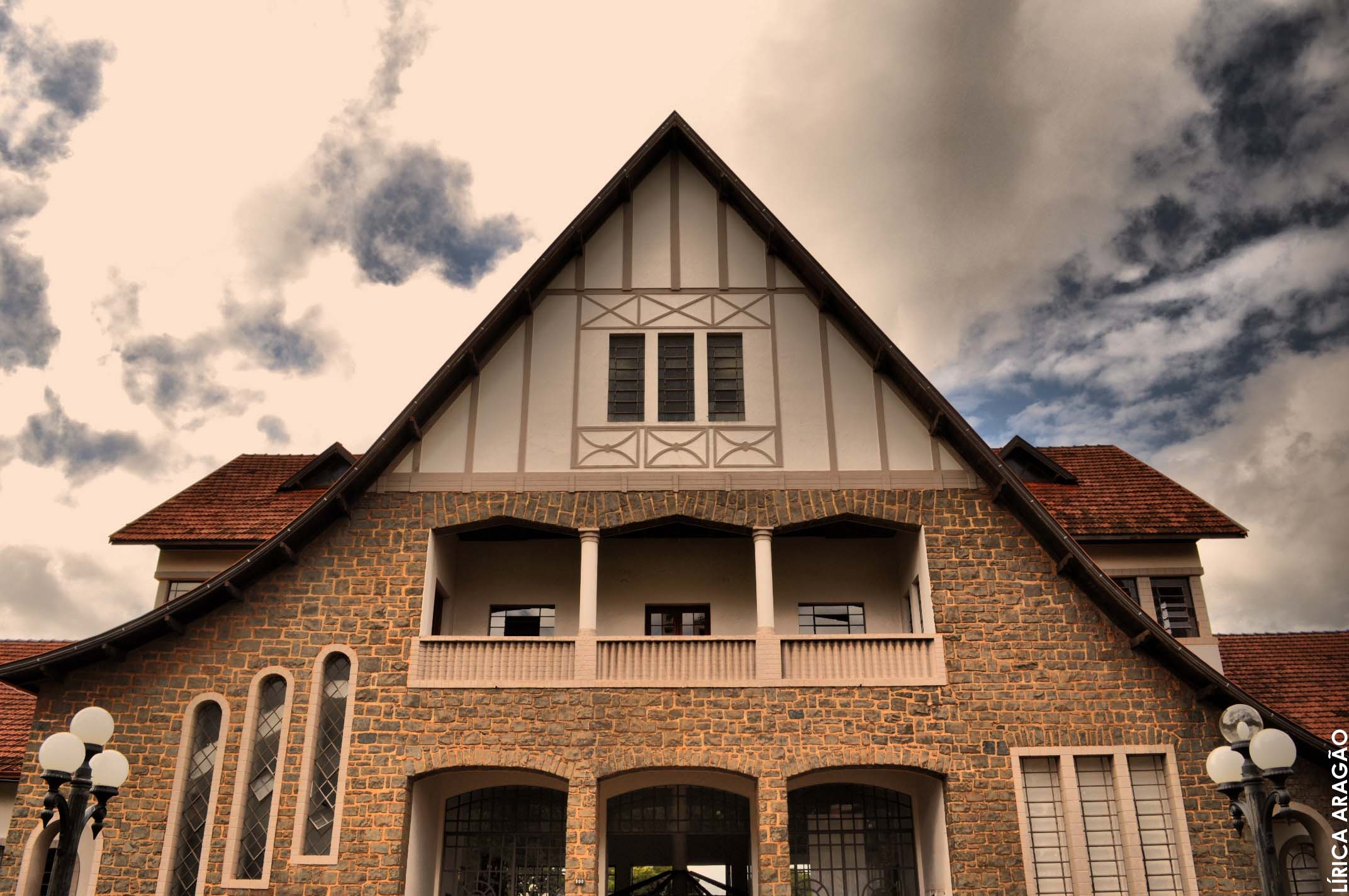
Londrina Historical Museum.

The Federal University of Paraná was established in 1912, and the Pontifical Catholic University of Paraná in 1959. Other public universities contributing to Paraná's culture include the Federal Technological University of Paraná, Federal University of the Southern Border, Federal University for Latin American Integration, State University of Central-West Paraná, State University of Londrina, State University of Maringá, State University of Ponta Grossa, State University of Northern Paraná, State University of Western Paraná, and State University of Paraná.

The Paraná Museum in Curitiba, founded in 1876 by Agostinho Ermelino de Leão, holds historical, ethnographic, and archaeological collections and a specialized library. The Colonel Davi Antônio da Silva Carneiro Museum in Curitiba has collections listed as protected by the National Institute of Historic and Artistic Heritage, including archaeological, ethnographic, and numismatic pieces. Other museums include the Tropeiro Museum in Castro, Campos Gerais Museum in Ponta Grossa, Londrina Historical Museum, Visconde de Guarapuava Museum, Memory House of Carambeí Historical Park, Cancela Farmhouse in Witmarsum Colony, and Lacerda House in Lapa. In Paranaguá, the Museum of Archaeology and Popular Arts, linked to the Federal University of Paraná, and the Paranaguá Historical and Geographical Institute are notable.

The Historical Heritage has also cataloged several architecturally and historically significant monuments in the state, such as the São Luís main church in Guaratuba, the house where General Carneiro died in Lapa, the historic Jesuit residence, and the Nossa Senhora dos Prazeres Fortress on Ilha do Mel in Paranaguá.

Curitiba's largest libraries are the Paraná Public Library, Paraná Museum library, UFPR libraries, and PUCPR library. Specialized libraries include the Curitiba Comic Book Library, Paraná Institute for Technical Assistance and Rural Extension's agricultural collection, and the Syndicate and Organization of Paraná Cooperatives' cooperative-focused library.

== Festivals, events, holidays, and state symbols ==
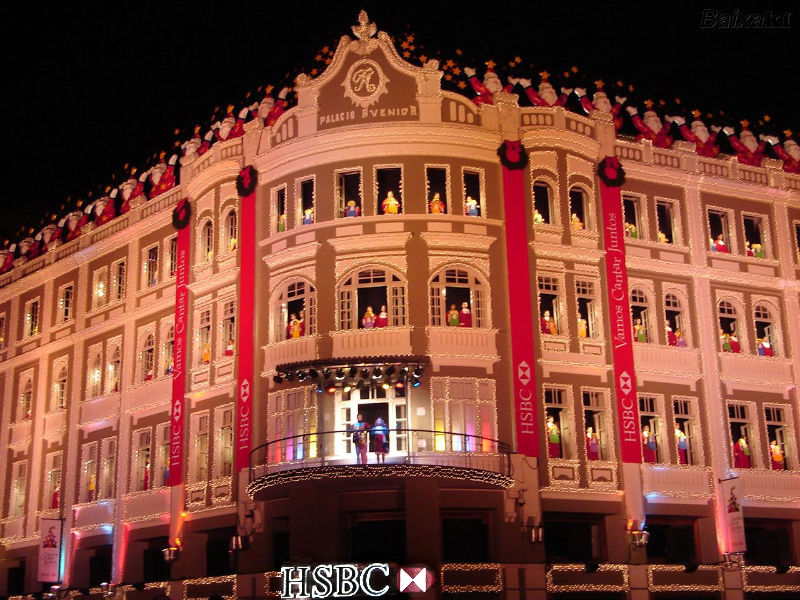
The "Christmas at Palácio Avenida" in Curitiba.

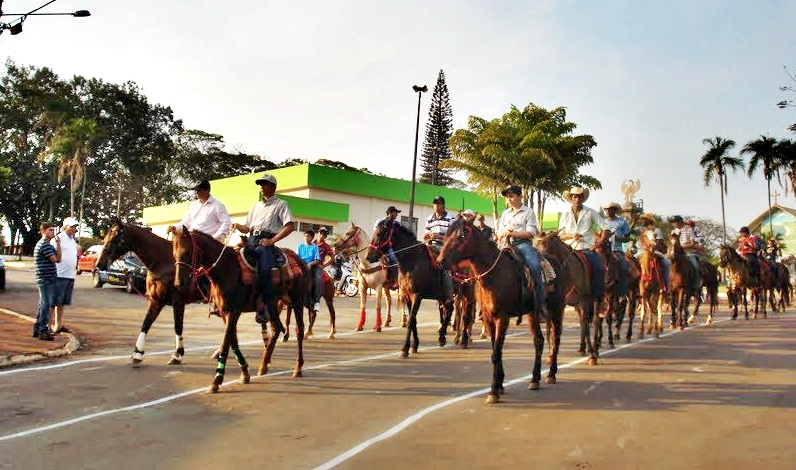
Cavalcade in the city of Fênix.

The state of Paraná hosts a variety of artistic and cultural events throughout its capital city and countryside. These events include folkloric, ethnic, gastronomic, religious, carnival, sports, and other festivals, as well as cavalcades, June festivals, and Christmas celebrations. Some traditions, such as São Gonçalo festivals, Boi de Mamão, Pau-de-Fita, and Folias de Reis, are declining, with the latter now limited to small commemorations by older generations.

Held on November 15, the State Festival of Our Lady of Rocio is the largest religious festival in southern Brazil and the third largest in the country, drawing up to 200,000 people to the procession in Paranaguá. Only the Círio de Nazaré draws more people.

Other state festivals include: Münchenfest in Ponta Grossa; Fespop in Santa Terezinha de Itaipu; Londrina International Music Festival; Cascavel Dance Festival; Antonina Winter Festival; Festa do Carneiro no Buraco in Campo Mourão; Oktoberfest in Marechal Cândido Rondon and Rolândia; Festa Nacional do Charque; Guarapuava cavalcades; and the Spring Festival - Haru Matsuri in various cities. Agricultural fairs such as Expovel and Expo Londrina also draw interest.

Religious festivals include the feast of Our Lady of Light and Corpus Christi processions in Curitiba; the Feast of the Black Madonna of Częstochowa; Congada da Lapa, honoring Saint Benedict in Lapa; and the Feast of Our Lady of Brotas in Piraí do Sul since 1880.

Paraná's official symbols are the flag, coat of arms, and anthem. The azure jay is the symbolic bird (State Law No. 7957, 1984), and the Paraná pine is the symbolic tree.

Paraná has no state holiday. In 2014, the Legislative Assembly of Paraná abolished the political emancipation holiday, making it optional and unobserved by public or private sectors.

== See also ==
- Culture of Brazil

== Bibliography ==
- Garschagen, Donaldson M. (1998). "Paraná" [Paraná]. Nova Enciclopédia Barsa. Vol. 11. São Paulo: Encyclopædia Britannica do Brasil Publicações Ltda.
- Houaiss, Antônio (1993). "Paraná" [Paraná]. Enciclopédia Mirador Internacional. Vol. 16. São Paulo: Encyclopædia Britannica do Brasil Publicações Ltda.
- Verano, Paulo Nascimento (2009). "Paraná" [Paraná]. Enciclopédia Barsa Universal. Vol. 13. Rio de Janeiro: Barsa Planeta. Archived from the original on 11 January 2021.
- Wachowicz, Ruy Christovam (1972). História do Paraná [History of Paraná]. Curitiba: Editar.
- Wons, Iaroslaw (1994). Geografia do Paraná [Geography of Paraná] (6 ed.). Curitiba: Ensino Renovado.
