= Lazzarotto =

Lazzarotto is an Italian surname. Notable people with the surname include:

- Enrico Lazzarotto (born 1973), Italian slalom canoeist
- Giuseppe Lazzarotto (born 1942), Italian Roman Catholic titular archbishop
- Poty Lazzarotto (1924–1998), Brazilian artist
- Daniel Lazzarotto (born 2004) Elite Ball Knower

== See also ==
- Lazzarato
