= Debora Balardini =

Brazilian theater director

- Born: November 12, 1971 (age 54); Curitiba, Paraná, Brazil
- Education: Federal University of Paraná
- Occupations: Thespian, theatre director, acting coach, producer
- Years active: 1983–present

Debora Balardini is a Brazilian theater director, producer, and performer based in New York City. Balardini is the co-founder of Group .BR, New York City's only Brazilian theatre company.

== Early life ==
Born in Curitiba, Brazil during the military dictatorship that lasted from 1964 to 1985, Balardini immigrated to New York City, United States in 1995. Since her immigration to the United States, she has primarily been based in New York City.

Balardini studied Arts and Letters with focus on Portuguese and Spanish Literature at the Federal University of Paraná, as well as Modern Dance and Classical Ballet at the Pontifical Catholic University of Paraná (PUC-PR) and Faculdade de Artes do Paraná in Curitiba. As a dancer and theatre actress, Balardini premiered at Teatro Guaíra in Curitiba, one of the largest concert halls in Latin America. Her experiences of censorship during the Brazilian dictatorship of the 1960s–1980s would later influence her mid-career interest in artivism. She has worked in Argentina, Japan, Chile, France, and other countries during different stages of her life and career.

== Career ==
Although born and educated in Brazil, Balardini has been based in New York City for most of her career.

Balardini is the co-founder and Executive Director of Group .BR, New York City's only Brazilian theatre company. Balardini has performed in Group .BR's original Off-off-Broadway production of Inside the Wild Heart, an immersive theatrical experience based on the life and works of acclaimed Brazilian author, Clarice Lispector. This site-specific production received 4 nominations and one award at the 2017 Brazilian International Press Awards and was reviewed in HowlRound, No Proscenium, and the American Theatre magazine podcast.

Balardini has directed Group .BR's Off-off Broadway production of The Serpent by Brazilian playwright Nelson Rodrigues, staged at Teatro LaTea (New York) and nominated for a 2012 Brazilian International Press Award. Balardini's performance in Infinite While It Lasts, Group .BR's first original site specific production, was based on the life and works of Brazilian poet and composer Vinicius de Moraes (2013 and 2014). The Off-off Broadway play and its cast received 8 nominations to 2014 and 2015 Brazilian International Press Awards and a nomination for a 2014 New York Innovative Theatre Awards for best choreography.

Balardini is Co-Artistic Director of Nettles Artists Collective, a New York-based artist collective founded in 2005, with performing artist, Sandie Luna. With the Nettles, Balardini directed and co-produced Apple of My Eye (Menina dos Meus Olhos), the first ever professionally produced play written and performed by an artist with Down syndrome, Tathi Piancastelli, as well as a cast of 10 supporting actors. The play has been acknowledged by UNICEF for its inclusion in the arts initiative. Balardini also directed Bother Line, an Off-off Broadway one-woman show conceived and performed by Gio Mielle and produced by the Nettles, which premiered at Punto Space and at The Tank in 2018.

Additionally, Balardini is one of three co-founders of Punto Space, an event and performance venue, in Midtown, Manhattan, in 2014 and the theatre company that was opened from 2014 to 2019.

Balardini has also been influenced by Hatha Yoga philosophy and practice since becoming a Hatha RYT 2003.

Balardini's awards include the 2019 Social Impact & Arts Innovator award and 2016 Brazilian International Press Award.

== See also ==
- Clarice Lispector
- Nelson Rodrigues
- Vinicius de Moraes
