= Lazzarato =

Lazzarato is an Italian surname. Notable people with the surname include:

- David Lazzarato, Canadian businessman and board member of Flutter Entertainment
- Gigi Lazzarato (known as Gigi Goregous), Canadian internet personality and socialite
- Maurizio Lazzarato (born 1955), Italian sociologist and philosopher

== See also ==
- Lazzarotto
