= Helena Kolody =

Brazilian writer and poet (1912–2004)

Helena Kolody (1912–2004) was a Brazilian poet and educator. Considered to be the outstanding poet of the State of Paraná, she started writing poetry when she was 12 and published her first poem "A Lágrima" four years later. When she was 20, she became a schoolteacher and later, on graduation, a lecturer at the Curitiba Normal School. She is remembered in particular for being the first Brazilian to write verse in the Japanese haiku style, publishing "Cântico" in 1941 and including haiku verse in several later publications.

== Biography ==
Born in Cruz Machado on 12 October 1912, Helena Kolody was the daughter of Miguel and Victória a Kolody, both from the Ukrainian region of Galicia. She was raised in Três Barras and Rio Negro before moving to Curitiba, where she spent the rest of her life. After studying painting and music, when she was 12 she wrote her first poems. Four years later in 1928 her poem "A Lágrima" was published in the journal Marinha. After graduating from the Curitiba Normal School, she taught in various schools. In 1937 she joined the staff of the normal school where she served for 23 years.

In 1941, her first haiku was criticized for its lack of rhyme but she continued writing them. Her book of poems Paisagem Interior was placed second in the contest arranged by the Homens de Letras do Rio de Janeiro. In 1949, A Sombra do Rio was placed third in the Paraná Centro de Letras competition and won the Ismael Martins award. Her work received considerable interest in Brazilian literary circles and from writers including Carlos Drummond de Andrade, Cecília Meireles and Paulo Leminski.

Helena Kolody died in Curitiba on 15 February 2004, aged 91.

== Awards ==
In 2011, Helena Kolody was posthumously awarded the Grand Gross of the Ordem do Mérito Cultural.
