= Feijão tropeiro =

Brazilian bean dish

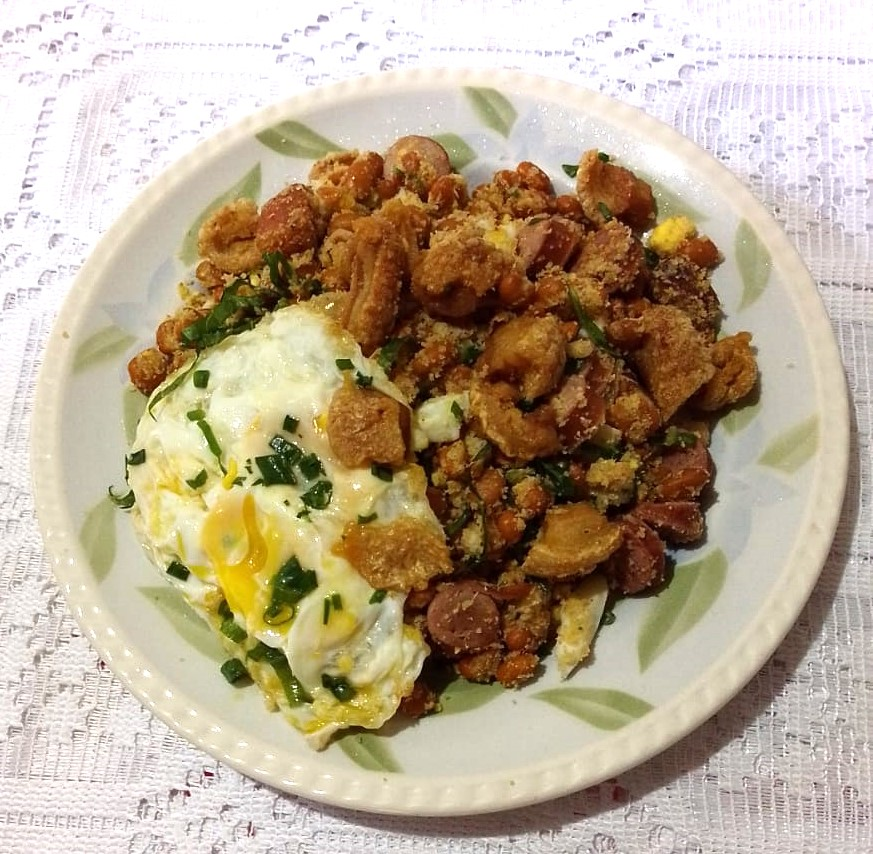
- Region or state: Paulistania
- Associated cuisine: Brazilian cuisine
- Main ingredients: Beans, sausage, and manioc flour

Feijão tropeiro, also known as feijão caipira, feijão de preguiça and feijão das onze, is a typical dish from Paulistania Region, specially the states of São Paulo, Minas Gerais, Goiás, Paraná and Mato Grosso, the region travelled by the tropeiros. It consists of beans mixed with cassava or maize flour, sausage, eggs, bacon or toucinho, seasoned with garlic, onion, parsley and peppercorn, and is sometimes enriched with chicharrón and Brassica oleracea. Initially, the most common way of cooking it was in an improvised trempe, as it was prepared on expeditions to the backlands by bandeirantes and later by tropeiros. It became a traditional dish in the region explored by bandeirantes and tropeiros.

== History ==
=== Origins ===
The dish has its origins in the 17th century. Its name comes from the tropeiros – (lit. "troopers") – merchants who sold horses, mules, and food between the south and southeast regions of Brazil. The typical dish were originally created before tropeiros, during the time of the bandeirantes, a pioneering movement originating in São Paulo, responsible for exploring the South America during Brazil's colonial period.

From the 17th to the 18th century, beans, treated as a staple food, cost one sixth the price of rice in São Paulo, and their low cost and durability helped make them part of the explorers' expeditions. It was cooked with bacon and salt; once ready, it was customary to mix it with corn flour until it formed a paste. This basic recipe ended up being adopted by all the people of the Paulista Plateau, and later spread to other parts of Paulistania, such as Goiás and Minas Gerais.

Due to the needs of the bandeirantes to transport animals to support their mining centers, the tropeiros emerged, becoming responsible for transporting goods on the backs of mules or horses through various regions of Brazil, a factor that became important for the dissemination of the bandeirantes food culture, among them, the mixture of beans and flour, which became popularly known as “feijão tropeiro,” which in English can be translated as "bean tropeiro."

The tropeiros created various meals to be eaten during their long journeys, which covered distances of up to 4,000 kilometers. Although they preferred the European food base, the tropeiros, like the bandeirantes, incorporated indigenous food customs, such as charki (type of dehydrated meat), maize flour, meat paçoca and corn flour. When the animals stopped to rest, the tropeiros ate beans with almost no sauce, to prevent them from spoiling easily, mixed with pieces of meat and toucinho.

=== Evolution ===
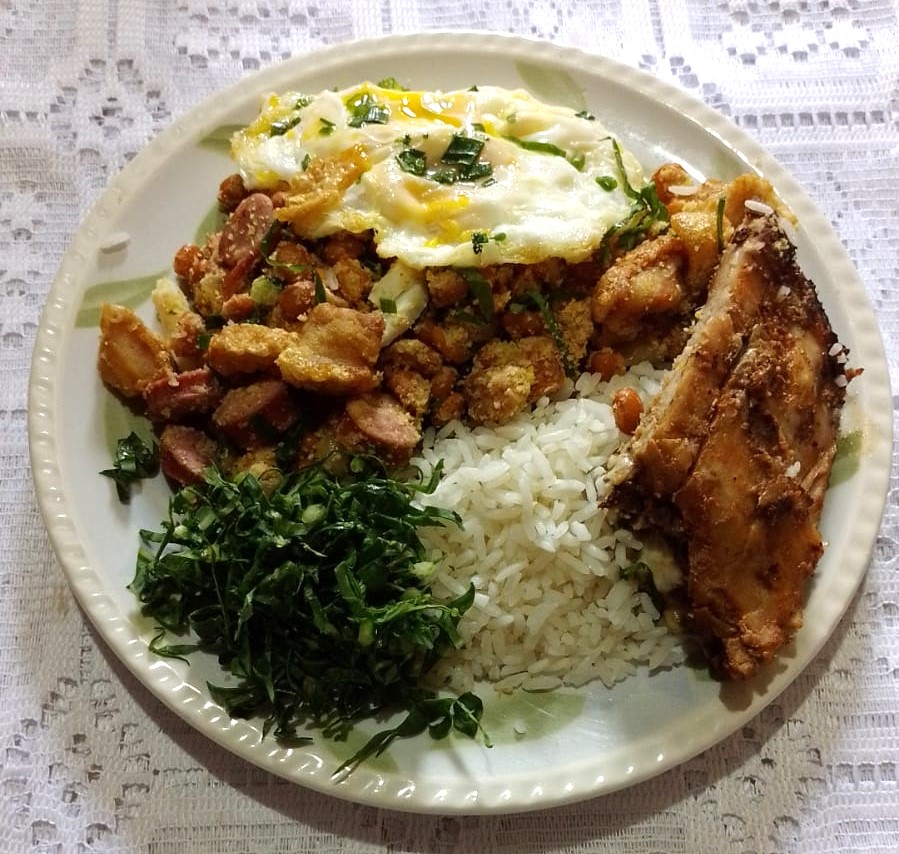
Feijão tropeiro and side dishes

Over time, feijão tropeiro became very popular and evolved. It became a richer dish with the addition of other types of meat such as calabresa sausage, fried pork belly, and bacon. It also included collard greens and a fried egg on top. The dish, in some places, is served with white rice, shredded collard greens, corn purée, and a slice of orange on the side.

== Cultural importance ==
Feijão tropeiro is one of the best-known dishes in Paulista and Brazilian cuisine, traditional mainly in the interior of São Paulo and in the states of Goiás, Minas Gerais, Mato Grosso and Paraná.

=== Connection with sports ===
The dish is iconic in Minas Gerais, this cuisine is one of the symbols of football culture in the municipality of Belo Horizonte. At Mineirão stadium, the dish became a tradition on match days. The dish gained its first popularity in the late 1990s, becoming more popular over the decades with restaurants inside the stadium which started selling and became famous for the dish.
