= Cruz Machado =

Coordinates: 26°01′S 51°21′W

- Municipality
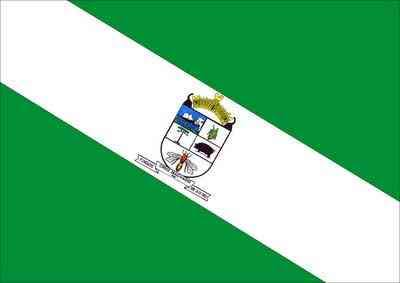
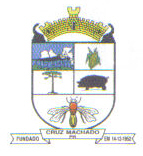
- Flag Coat of arms
- Interactive map of Cruz Machado
- Country: Brazil
- Region: Southern
- State: Paraná
- Mesoregion: Sudeste Paranaense

Population (2020)
  - Total: 18,741
- Time zone: UTC−3 (BRT)

Cruz Machado is a municipality in the state of Paraná in the Southern Region of Brazil.

== See also ==
- List of municipalities in Paraná
