= Fênix =

Coordinates: 23°54′S 51°57′W

- Municipality
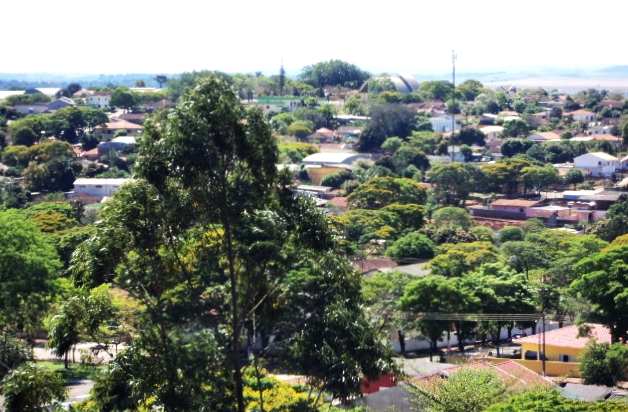

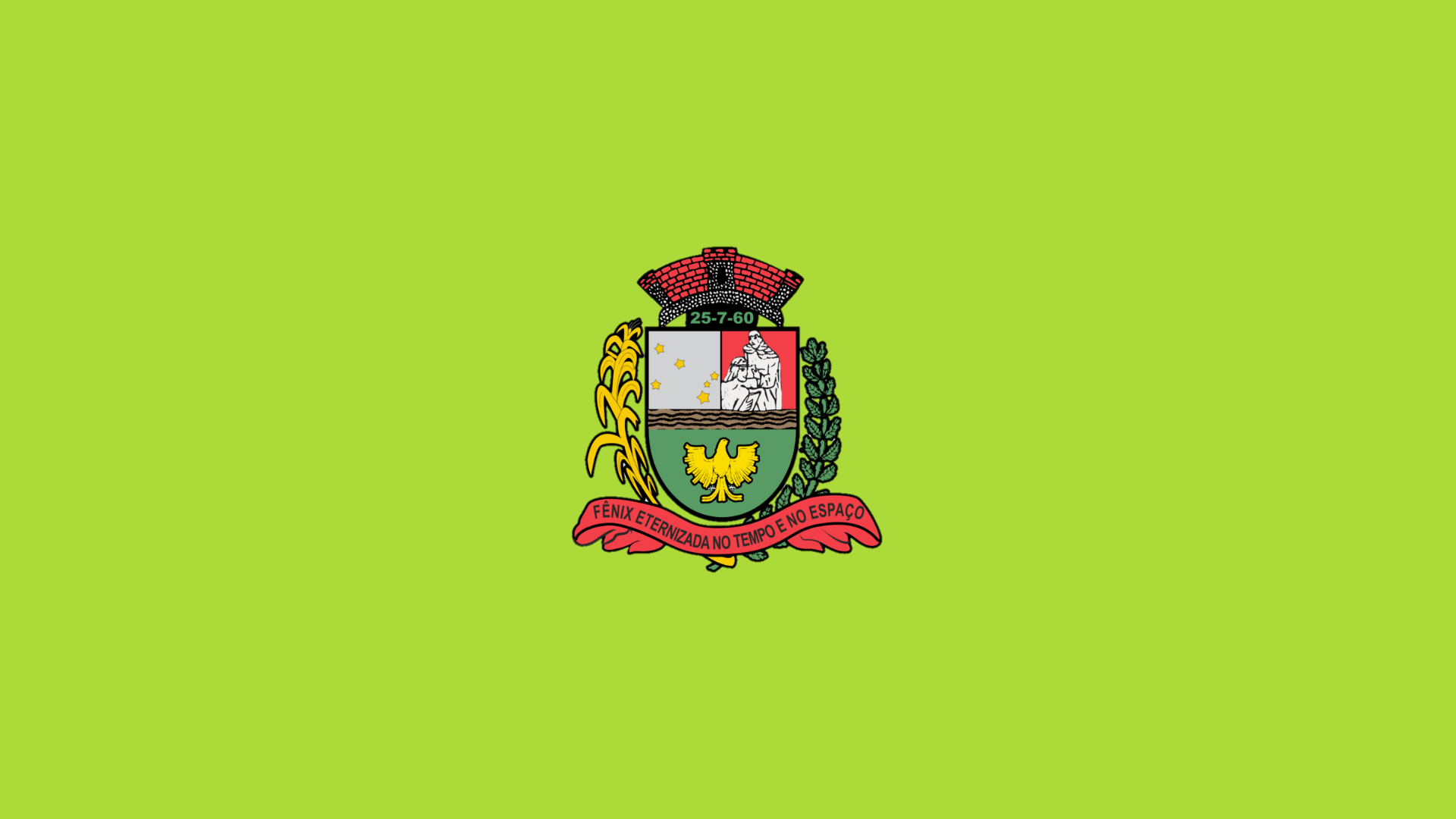
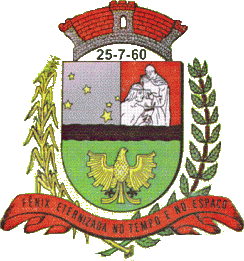
- Flag Seal

- Country: Brazil
- Region: Southern
- State: Paraná
- Mesoregion: Centro Ocidental Paranaense
- Emancipated: 25 July 1960

Government
  - Mayor: Eurípedes Molina Tasca Jr. (PSD)

Area
  - Total: 90,386 sq mi (234,098 km^{2})
- Elevation: 1,440 ft (440 m)

Population (2020)
  - Total: 4,748
- Time zone: UTC−3 (BRT)
- Postal Code (CEP): 86950-000
- Area code: +55 44
- HDI (2010): 0,716 - high

Fênix (the Brazilian form for the Portuguese word to Phoenix) is a municipality in the state of Paraná in the Southern Region of Brazil.

== See also ==
- List of municipalities in Paraná
