= Alfredo Andersen =

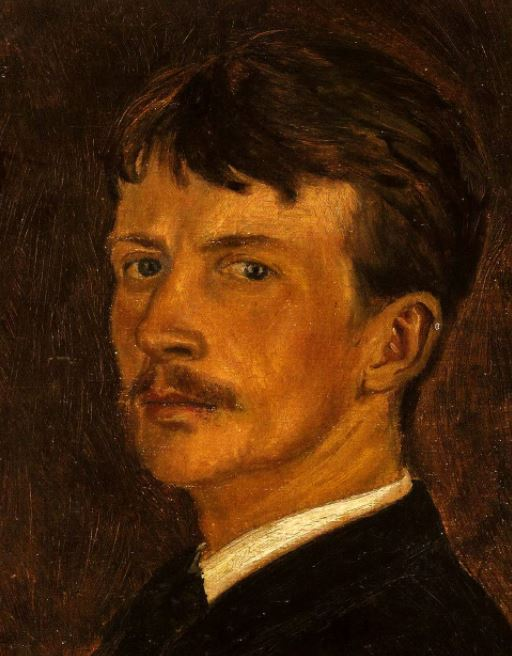
Self-portrait (date unknown)

Alfred Emil Andersen, known as Alfredo (3 November 1860, Kristiansand - 9 August 1935, Curitiba) was a Norwegian-born painter, sculptor, scenographer and art professor, who spent most of his life in Brazil. He is sometimes referred to as the "Father of painting of Paraná".

== Life and work ==
His father, Tobias Andersen, was a captain in the merchant marine. He created his first painting at the age of thirteen. He began his formal studies at the age of seventeen, in Christiania (Oslo) at the Academy of Fine Arts, under the direction of Wilhelm Krogh (1829–1913). He would be Krogh's assistant from 1877 to 1879. After that, he attended the Royal Danish Academy of Fine Arts in Copenhagen, while working as a drawing teacher at an elementary school. He graduated in 1883 and returned to Christiania, where he took private lessons from Olaf Isaachsen. He had his first solo exhibition in 1884.

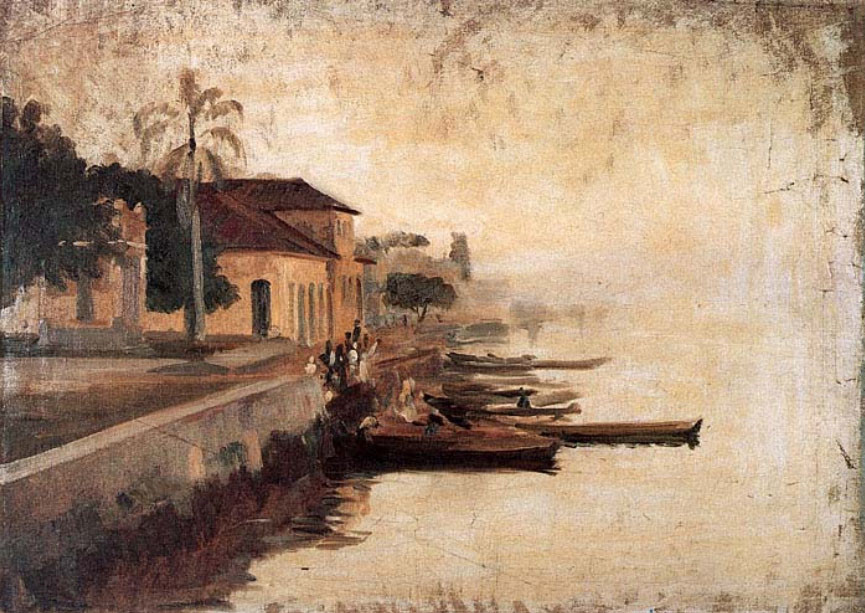
The Port of Paranaguá

In 1891, he went on a voyage with his father; sailing throughout the Atlantic. Their ship crashed in the port of Antonina, in Paraná, and they spent some time there while it was repaired; during which he painted some landscapes. When they arrived home, they found that most of old Kristiansand had been destroyed by a fire. The technical school had survived, but they rejected his application on the grounds that he was a "freethinker". He decided to go back to South America, first to Buenos Aires, then to Brazil, where he settled in Paranaguá in 1893.

There, he met Anna de Oliveira, a Native-American woman of Carijó ancestry, who was much younger than him. Eventually, they began living together. In 1902, they moved to Curitiba and had four children, including Thorstein Andersen (1905–1964), who also became a painter. Later, he opened a drawing and painting school at their home.

After becoming established, he served as a professor of drawing at the Escola Alemã (German School) and the Colégio Paranaense. He was also director of the evening classes at the Escola de Belas Artes e Indústria. His first exhibition in Curitiba came in 1907. He would hold four more exhibitions there by 1930, as well as in Rio de Janeiro (1918) and São Paulo (1921).

The Norwegian government offered him a position at the Christiania Academy in 1927 but, after a year there, he returned to Paraná. During that time, he painted his well-known portrait of the author, Knut Hamsun, who had been awarded the Nobel Prize in Literature in 1920.

On his seventy-first birthday, in 1931, he was made an honorary citizen of Curitiba, for his services to the local art community. It was the first such citizenship the city had awarded. This led to his nickname, "pai da pintura Paranaense". Four years later, he died of pneumonia.

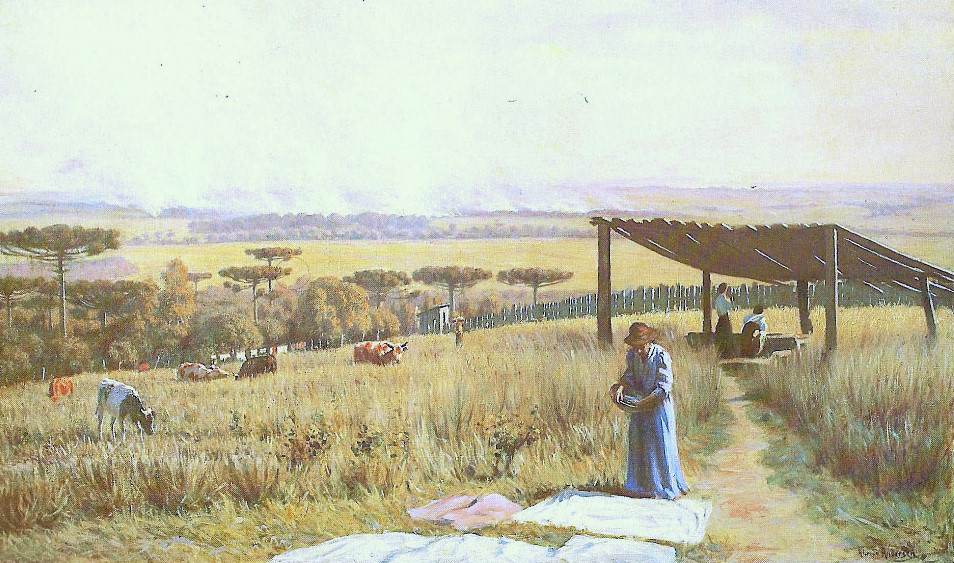
Washerwomen

In 1959, the government of Paraná turned his home into an official art school and museum. Later, it was added to the Patrimônio Histórico e Artístico do Estado and, in 1979, it became the Museu Alfredo Andersen.
