= Poty Lazzarotto =

Brazilian artist

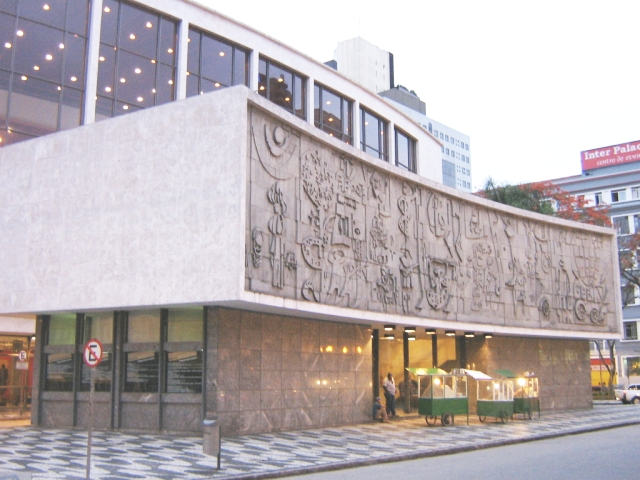
Teatro Guaíra (Guaira Theatre) facade with Poty Lazzarotto's mural. Curitiba (PR), Brazil

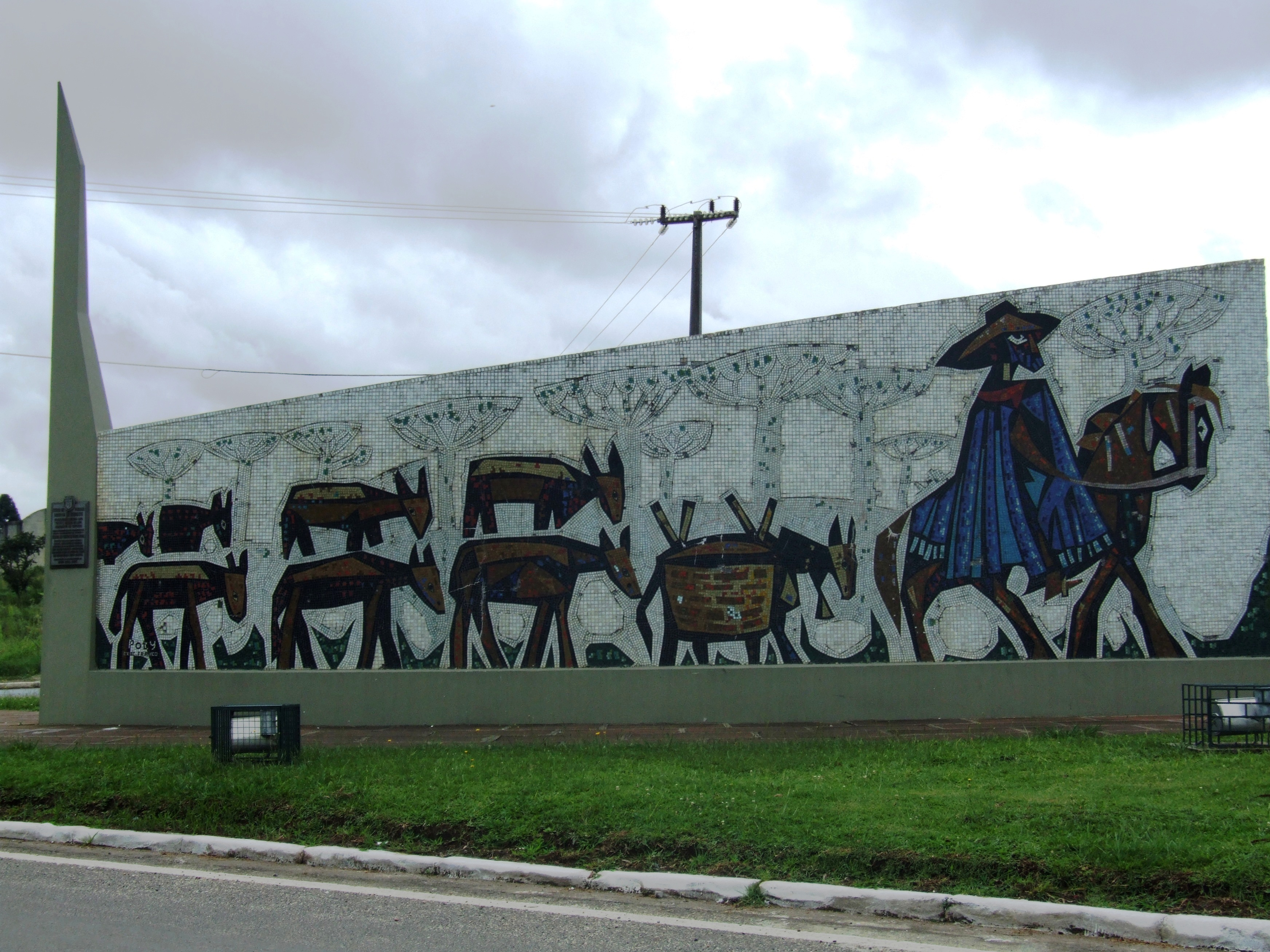
Monumento aos Tropeiros (Poty Lazzarotto), Lapa (PR), Brazil.

Napoleon Potyguara Lazzarotto, better known as Poty (Curitiba, March 29, 1924 – Curitiba, May 8, 1998) was a Brazilian artist. His murals - often made of ceramic tiles - can be seen in many localities of Brazil as well as in Portugal, France and Germany.

Nonetheless, most of Poty's works were done in his hometown: Curitiba. Therefore, the artist mosaics, spread out through the capital of Paraná, are among the main icons of the city.

== Biography ==
Son of the Italians Issac Lazzarotto and Julia Tortato Lazzarotto, he began to be interested in drawing as a child. His father was a railroad worker and his mother ran a restaurant in the city, the "Wagon of the Armistice", much frequented by intellectuals from Paraná.

Poty's father lost one of his arms, due to an accident, and to help with the family budget he was looking for aluminum pieces that were modeled in paintings of the Holy Supper to sell. Poty and his childhood friends used to go to his father's shed to help move the bellows. The shed that his father built in front of his house, in Curitiba, was renamed "Wagon of Armistice", becoming a restaurant since 1937, under the care of his mother. The governor of Paraná, Manoel Ribas, frequented the restaurant and, in 1942, awarded Poty a scholarship at the National School of Fine Arts, in Rio de Janeiro.

In 1938, at the age of 14, Poty published in the newspaper Diário da Tarde the story "Haroldo, o Homem Relâmpago", in 6 chapters.

In 1943, Hermínio da Cunha César invited Poty to illustrate his book "Lenda da Herva Mate Sapecada", in Rio de Janeiro. It was the first book illustrated by Poty and published.

== Sources ==
- Encyclopedia of Visual Arts. "Lazzarotto, Poty (1924 - 1998)".
