= Tropeiro =

Person in Brazil who leads mule caravans

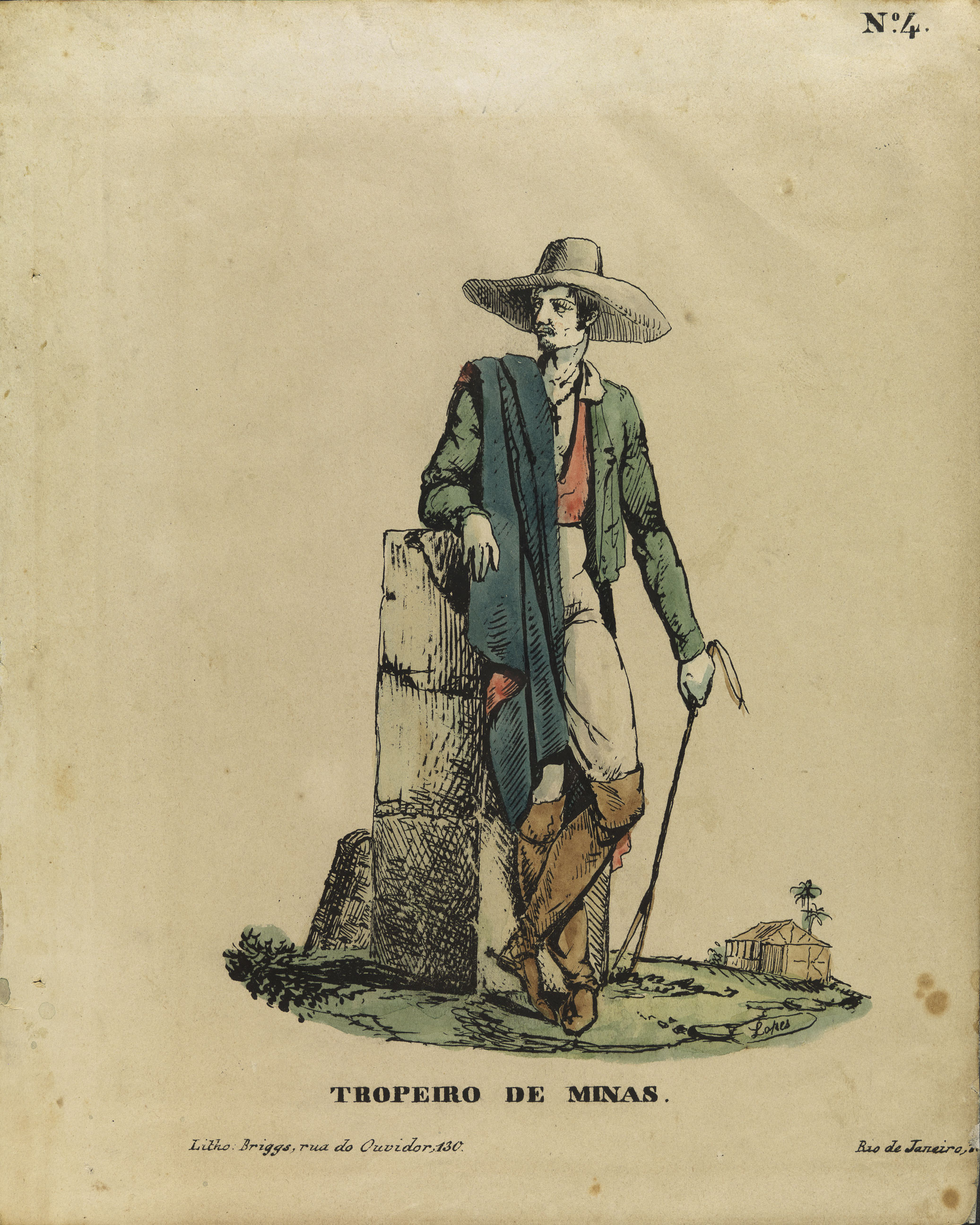
Tropeiro from Minas Gerais

Tropeiro is the designation given to troop and commissions drovers of horse, cattle and mule moving between commercial regions and consumer centers in Brazil from the 17th century. It is akin to the North American bullwhacker and the Australian bullocky.

== Description ==
Each entourage was divided into lots of seven animals, each in the care of a man who controlled them through shouts and whistles. Each animal carried about 120 kilograms and went as far as 3,000 kilometers.

In addition to its important role in the economy, the tropeiro had important cultural importance as a vehicle for ideas and news between villages and communities which were distant from each other, at a time when there were no roads in Brazil.

Along the routes they traveled, they helped to sprout several of today's cities in Brazil. The cities of Taubaté, Sorocaba, Santana de Parnaíba and São Vicente in São Paulo, Viamão, Cruz Alta and Vacaria in Rio Grande do Sul, Lages in Santa Catarina and Castro in Paraná are some of the pioneer cities that stood out for the activity of their tropeiros.

== Trading ==
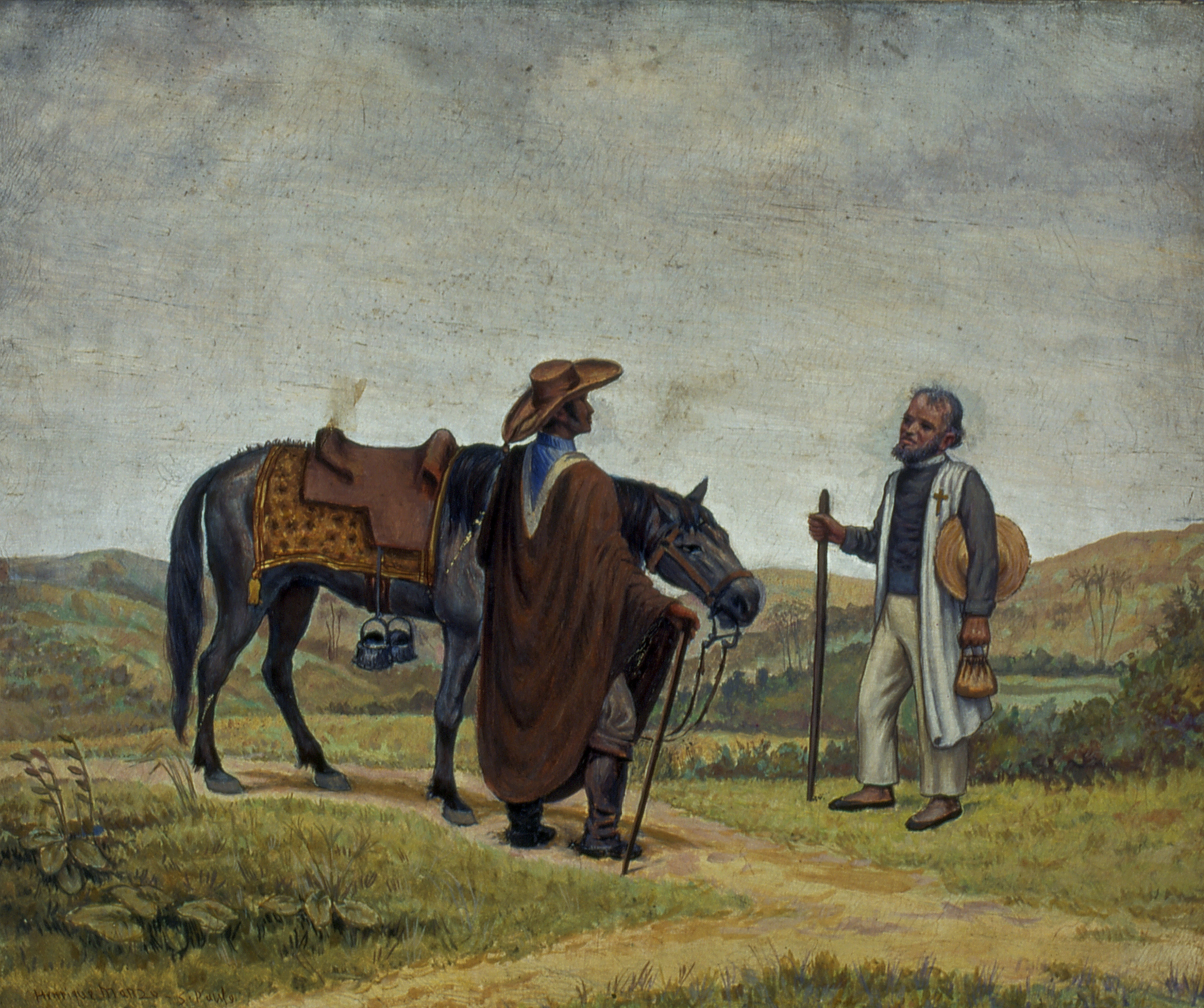
Tropeiro Paulista e Pedinchão de Esmolas, by Henrique Manzo

Before the railways, and long before the trucks, the merchandise trade was done by tropeiros in the regions where there were no alternatives of maritime navigation or waterway for its distribution. The interior regions, far from the coast, depended for a long time on this means of transport by mules. From the end of the seventeenth century, Minas Gerais, for example, demanded the formation of groups of merchants in the interior trade. Initially called men of the way, traffickers or passers-by, the tropeiros became fundamental in the trade of slaves, food and tools of the miners.

Far from being specialized merchants, the tropeiros bought and sold of everything a little: slaves, tools, clothes, etc. The existence of the tropeirismo was closely related to the coming and going by the roads and roads, with emphasis to the Estrada Real — route by which the gold miners arrived at the port of Rio de Janeiro and followed to Portugal.

The constant movement of the troops not only made commerce possible but also became a key element in the economic reproduction of Tropeirismo.

The tropeiros transported a wide variety of goods such as brown sugar, cachaça, vinegar, wine, olive oil, cod, dried fish, cheese, butter, biscuit, raisins, flour, ginger, soap, dried fruit, chorizo, salami, kitchenware, marmalade, coconut, dried meat, cotton, salt, window glass, etc.
