= Teatro Guaíra =

Theatre in Curitiba, Paraná, Brazil

Coordinates: 25°25′41.52″S 49°15′55.54″W

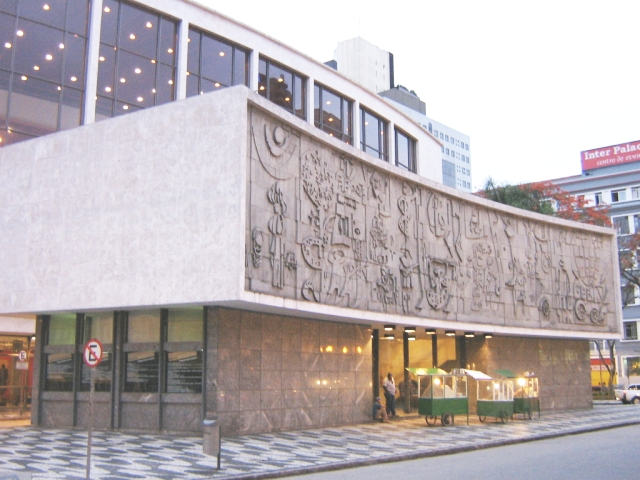
Theater facade with Poty Lazzarotto's mural.

The Teatro Guaíra Cultural Centre is a state-run cultural institution located in Curitiba, Paraná, Brazil. It was built in 1945 at Santos Andrade Square. The theater has about 3,000 seats in three different auditoria, and is one of the largest concert halls in Latin America.

Some of the artists' groups maintained by Teatro Guaíra Culture Centre are: the Symphony Orchestra of Paraná, the "Balé Teatro Guaíra" (dance company) and the "Teatro de Comédia do Paraná" (theater group).
