= Itaipu Lake =

Lake on the Brazil-Paraguay border

- Lago de Itaipu (Portuguese)
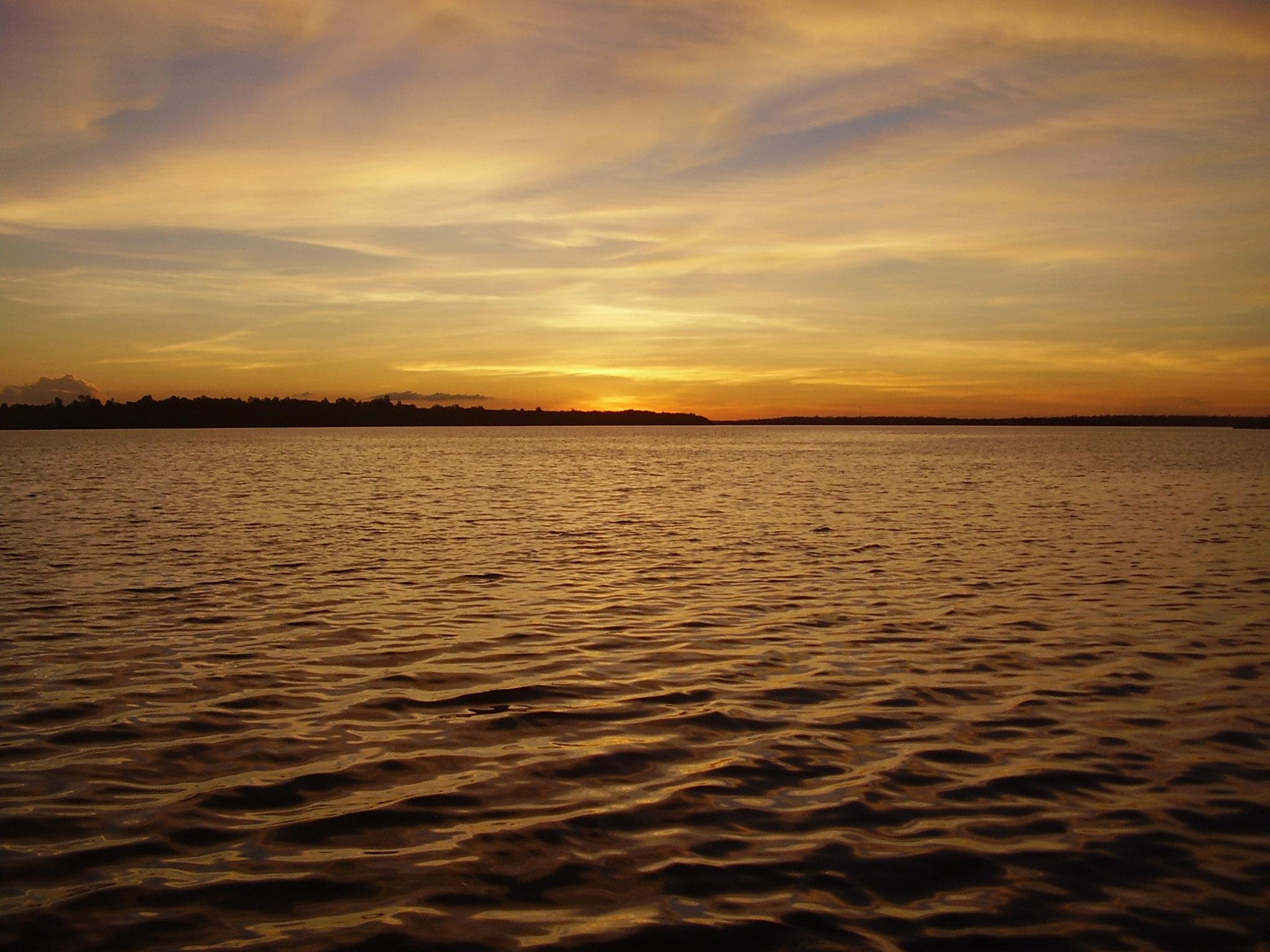
- Sunset seen from the marinas of Santa Helena, on the shores of Itaipu Lake

- Location within Brazil Location within Paraguay
- Location: Paraná River, Brazil–Paraguay border
- Coordinates: 24.933359°S 54.41998°W
- Type: Artificial lake
- Basin countries: Brazil, Paraguay
- Surface area: 1,350 km^{2} (520 sq mi)
- Average depth: 22 m (72 ft)
- Max. depth: 170 m (560 ft)

Itaipu Lake (Portuguese: Lago de Itaipu, pronounced [ˈlaɡu dʒi itajˈpu]) is a lake on the Brazil-Paraguay border, artificially formed in 1982 on the Paraná River with the closing of the gates of the Itaipu Hydroelectric Dam detour channel. It covers an area of 1,350 km^{2} (520 sq mi), 770 km^{2} (300 sq mi) on the Brazilian side and 580 km^{2} (220 sq mi) on the Paraguayan side. It also includes 66 small islands, 44 of which are on the Brazilian side and 22 on the Paraguayan side of the border.

== Etymology ==
Itaipu is a word of Tupi origin meaning "noise of the river of stones" or "noisy river of stones", through the combination of itá (stone), y (water, river), and pu (noise). Itaipu was the name of the small island that existed near the construction site of the dam.

== Geographical aspects ==
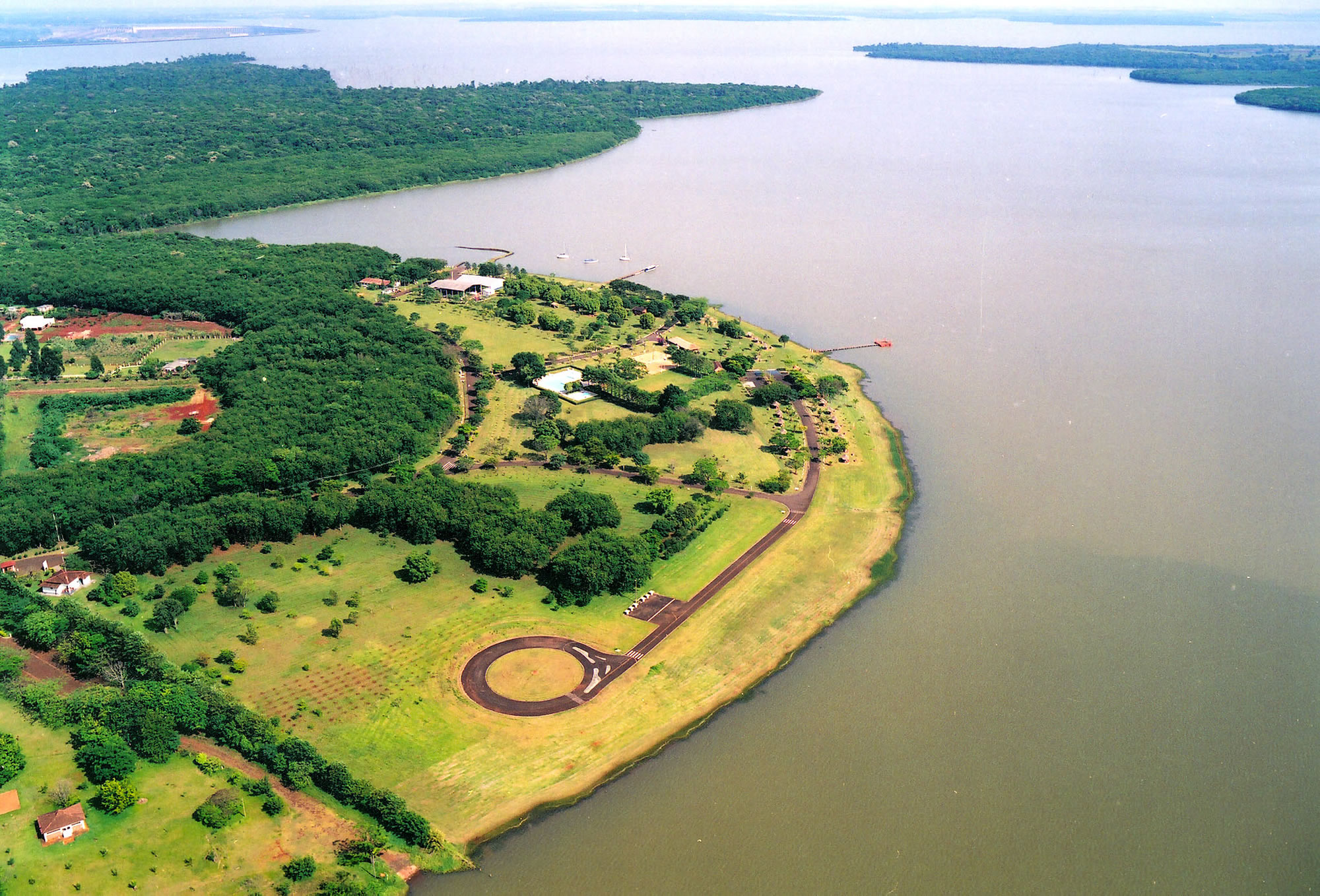
Itaipu Lake seen from above

Exactly at the border of Mato Grosso do Sul with the Paraguayan Canindeyú Department, Paraná-Mato Grosso do Sul and Paraná-Canindeyú department, were located the Guaíra Falls, formed by the Paraná River when the watercourse descended from the basaltic plateau to the gorge that led to La Prata River's plain. In 1982, Itaipu Dam's lake submerged the falls, amid protests from environmentalists.

On the shores of the Itaipu lake, there are 15 Brazilian municipalities belonging to the state of Paraná: Diamante d'Oeste, Entre Rios do Oeste, Foz do Iguaçu, Guaíra, Itaipulândia, Marechal Cândido Rondon, Mercedes, Missal, Pato Bragado, Santa Helena, Santa Terezinha de Itaipu, São José das Palmeiras, São Miguel do Iguaçu, and Terra Roxa.

There is also one Brazilian town which belongs to the state of Mato Grosso do Sul: Mundo Novo. These coastal towns receive 85% of the 65% of the resources allocated to the municipalities that are entitled to royalties. They benefit the most because they were directly affected by the formation of the power plant reservoir.

== Tourism ==
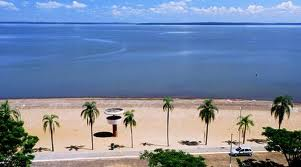
Tourist Terminal Alvorada de Itaipu, in Santa Terezinha de Itaipu.

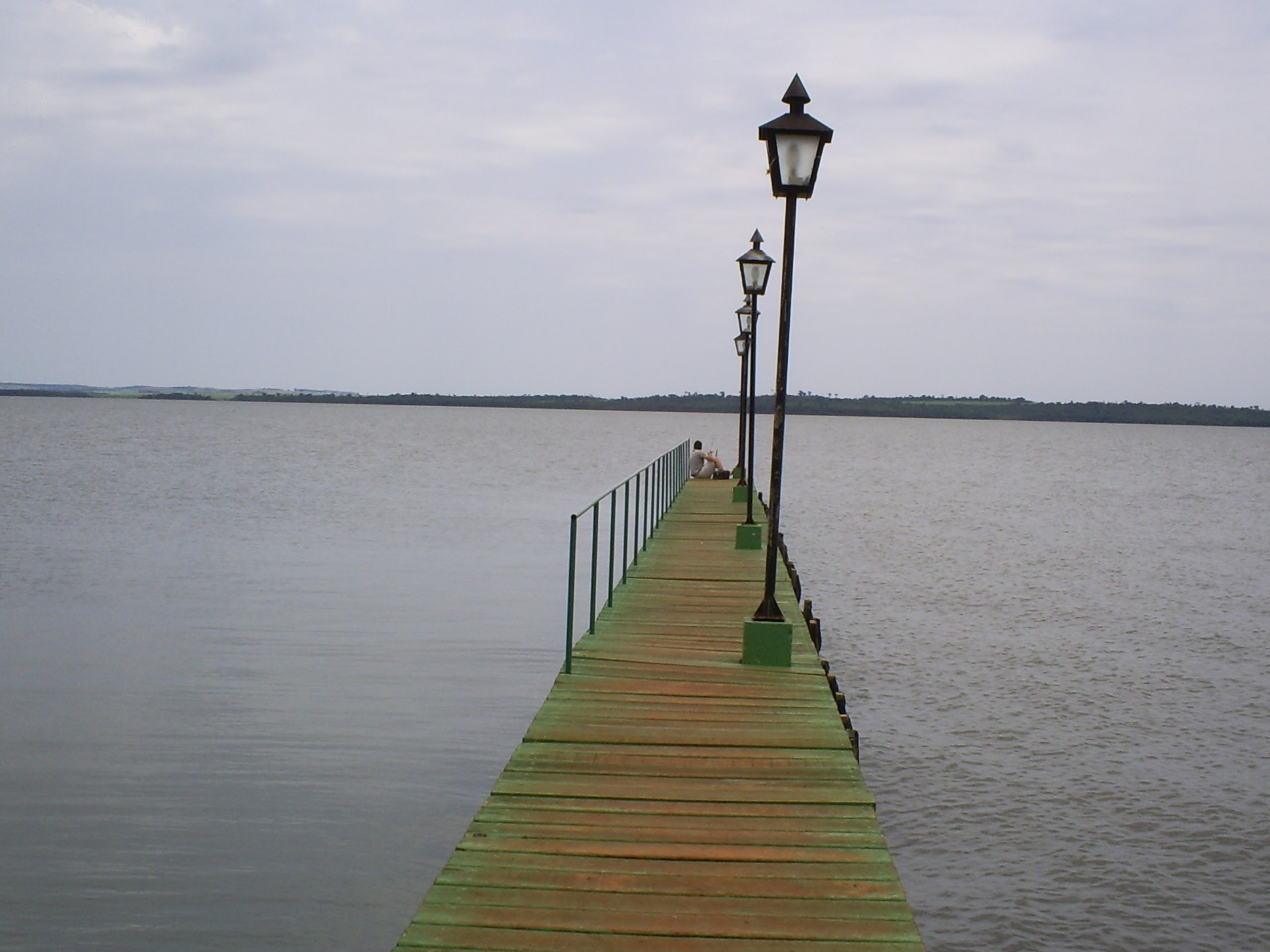
Trapiche (pier) in Porto Mendes.

The Itaipu Lake has become an important tourist attraction in the western region of Paraná. To stimulate the development of sustainable tourism, sixteen municipalities bordering the lake were founded in 1990, in partnership with Itaipu Binacional, the Development Council for Cities Bordering the Itaipu Lake. With representatives of the City Halls, City Councils and Commercial Associations of the riverside towns, the Council promotes the region's urban and rural socioeconomic development.

Among the partnerships developed is the program "Integrated Tourism Paths to Lake Itaipu". Resulting from the union of the Development Council for Cities Bordering the Itaipu Lake and Sebrae/PR, the program is managed by the Institute of Tourism and Events Caminhos ao Lago de Itaipu. It is responsible for marketing and assisting the Council and Sebrae in promoting regional tourism.

With the program, the cities allow visitors to Foz do Iguaçu to get to know natural areas, spaces and cultural manifestations, as well as rural, ecological, culinary and religious tourism options.

The itineraries include varied tourist attractions that allow the visitors to be in contact with the Italian, Germanic and indigenous cultures, musical performances, dance and handicrafts, as well as fish-based dishes such as pintado na telha, cucas, bolachas and homemade jellys. Visitors to Foz do Iguaçu can also take part in natural activities such as hiking and observing the fauna and flora, as well as water-related attractions such as boat trips and recreational fishing along Itaipu Lake.

== Environment ==
Analyses carried out since 1986 have managed to identify the biodiversity of the region. According to the studies, in the area comprising the reservoir protection strip, reserves and shelters located on the Brazilian shore of Itaipu Lake, there are 305 species of birds, 44 species of mammals and 37 of reptiles. On the Paraguayan shore, where the native forest has not been heavily affected, 409 species of birds and 62 species of mammals have already been recorded.

== See also ==
- Itaipu Dam
- Guaíra Falls
- Refugio Mbaracayú
- List of lakes of Brazil
