= Itaipu (disambiguation) =

Itaipu Dam is a hydroelectric dam on the Brazil-Paraguay border.

Itaipu may also refer to:

- Itaipu Lake, located on the Brazil-Paraguay border
- Itaipu Airport, in Hernandarias, Paraguay
- Itaipu, Niterói, a district in Rio de Janeiro, Brazil
- Itaipu (Glass), a 1989 composition by Philip Glass
- Gurgel Itaipu E150, a 1975 Brazilian electric car named after the dam and power plant
- Gurgel Itaipu E400, a 1981 follow-up vehicle

== See also ==
- Santa Terezinha de Itaipu, a municipality in Paraná, Brazil
