= Dois Vizinhos =

- Municipality
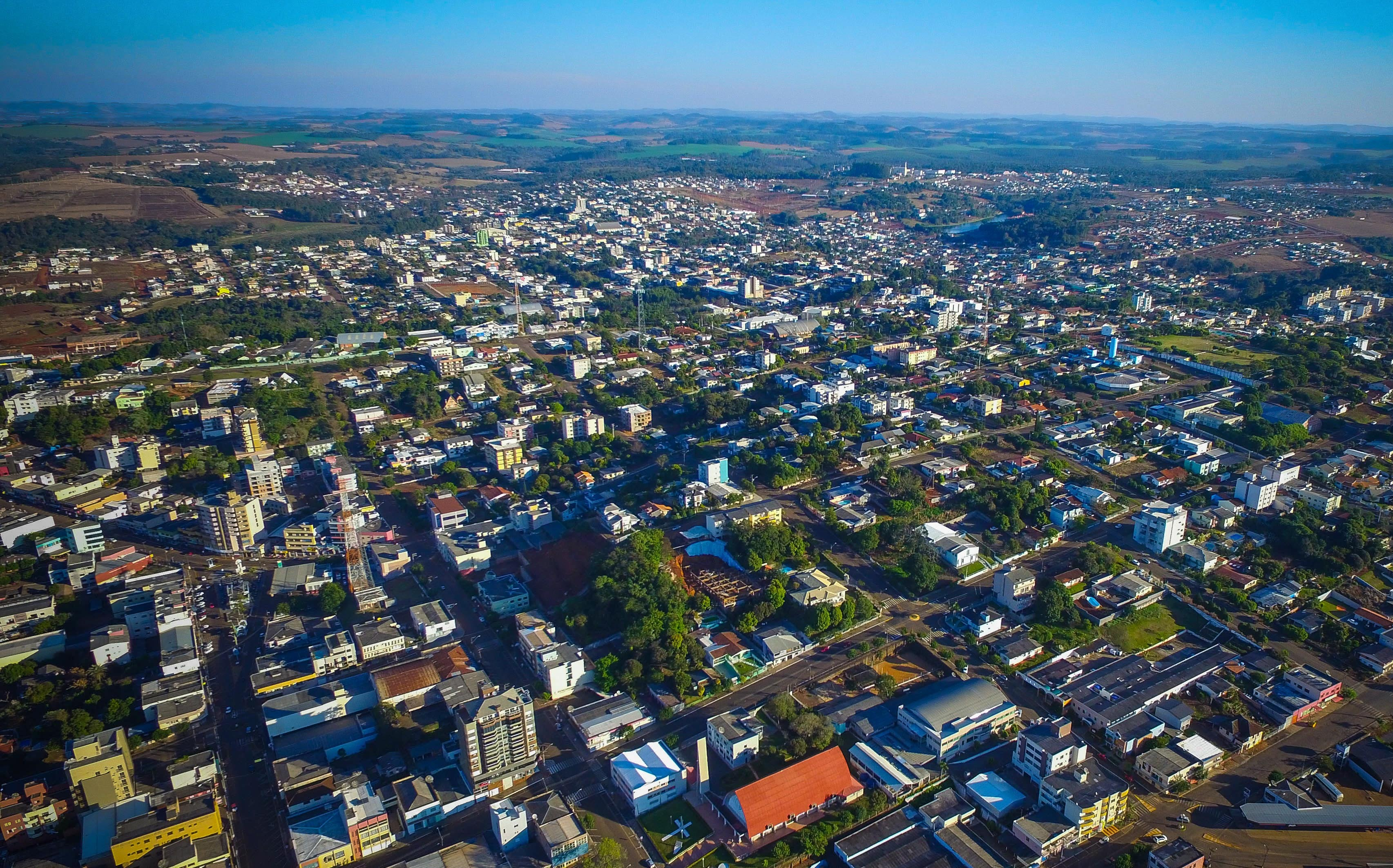
- Aerial view of the city, in 2016.

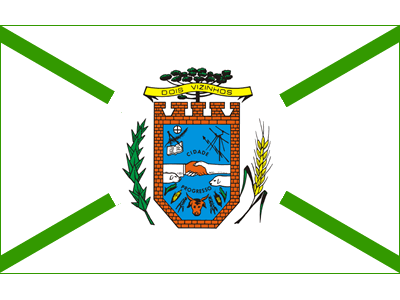
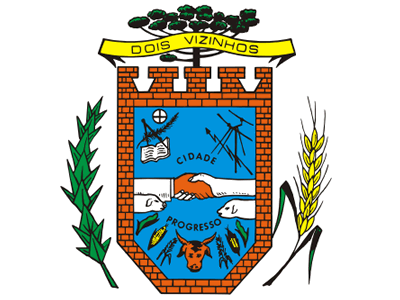
- Flag Coat of arms

- Location within Brazil
- Country: Brazil
- State: Paraná

Government
  - Mayor: Raul Camilo Isotton (PMDB)

Area
  - Total: 418 km^{2} (161 sq mi)
- Elevation: 509 m (1,670 ft)

Population (2020)
  - Total: 41,038
  - Density: 86.42/km^{2} (223.8/sq mi)
- IBGE
- Time zone: UTC−3 (BRT)
- Website: doisvizinhos.pr.gov.br in Portuguese

Dois Vizinhos ("Two Neighbours" in English) gained its municipality on November 28, 1961. It is a Brazilian municipality in the southwestern state of Paraná, situated in the southwestern mesoregion of the state and in the microregion of Francisco Beltrão. It is at an average altitude of 509 meters in relation to sea level. Its main accesses are by highways PR-281, PR-473 and PR-493. Its population, according to the 2020 estimate of IBGE, was of 41,038 inhabitants. In 2005, the municipality won the title of National Capital of Chicken.

Dois Vizinhos has a population of approximately 40,000 people, of whom the major part lives in the city. The economy is mainly based on agriculture, turkey and chicken processing and export, and an ascending computer industry named CISS. It is the birthplace of the footballer Dagoberto who plays as a forward.

== Demography ==
Population

População (1970-2007)
| Ano | Habitantes |
|---|---|
| 1970 | 37,324 |
| 1980 | 42,472 |
| 1991 | 40,267 |
| 1993 | 32,687 |
| 2000 | 31,986 |
| 2007 | 34,001 |
| 2020 | 41,038 |

Dois Vizinhos went through different periods in their development. In the decade of 1950 to 1960, there was intense population and significant population growth. The population, generally speaking, is made up of immigrants from Santa Catarina and Rio Grande do Sul descendants of predominantly Italian immigrants, followed by Poles, Germans and Japanese individuals.

From the 1970s, there was a population decrease of 8.76% of the rural population in relation to its totality, while the urban population grew up to 193.89% in relation to its total population. The decrease of the rural population is due to the factors of the agricultural mechanization that caused the rural exodus, contributed to both the drought that occurred from December 77 to May 78. Urban population growth is justified by the growth of cities themselves, by the development of industry and commerce. In the [1980s] we had a decrease of 5.42% in the total population, and the rural population decreased by 40.39%, a decrease that occurred due to several factors: dry (drought) from December 85 to January 1986 and July 1988. Causing severe damage to agricultural production. Contrary to the decrease of the rural population, the urban population grew 8.51% in relation to its total population. This factor also justifies the strong rural exodus. In the 1990s, another significant factor changed the population scenario, when in 1993, the physical-territorial dismemberment of the administrative districts of Cruzeiro do Iguaçu and Boa Esperança do Iguaçu occurred.

== Education ==
The IDEB of the municipality is 6.7 (out of 10.0) for the initial years of Elementary School. This index is one of the best results in the region, the 8th best at the state level (tied with another nine municipalities) and higher than the national index which is 5.7.

13 Municipal Schools (9 urban and 4 rural - serves 3,523 students) and 11 State Colleges (5th to 8th and High School - 5124 students). Of these, fifteen are located in the urban perimeter and nine in the rural area, with approximately 8647 students attending. In the service to the schools they act:

- 565 teachers duly qualified and registered by the municipal administration and the state government.
- 371 students in the Private Network of Primary Education.
- 200 students in high school.

The municipality has two higher education institutions; the Unisep of a private character and a campus of the Federal University of Technology - Paraná, making Dois Vizinhos a growing educational center in the entire southwestern region. It has a total of 23 courses offered by the two educational centers, making up a contingent of over two thousand students in higher education. Unisep College stands out in the region for being the fastest growing in the entire state of Paraná, counting with 11 undergraduate and 3 post graduate.

== See also ==
- List of municipalities in Paraná
