= Guaíra Falls =

Submerged waterfall on the Paraná River in Paraguay and Brazil

Guaíra / Guairá Falls
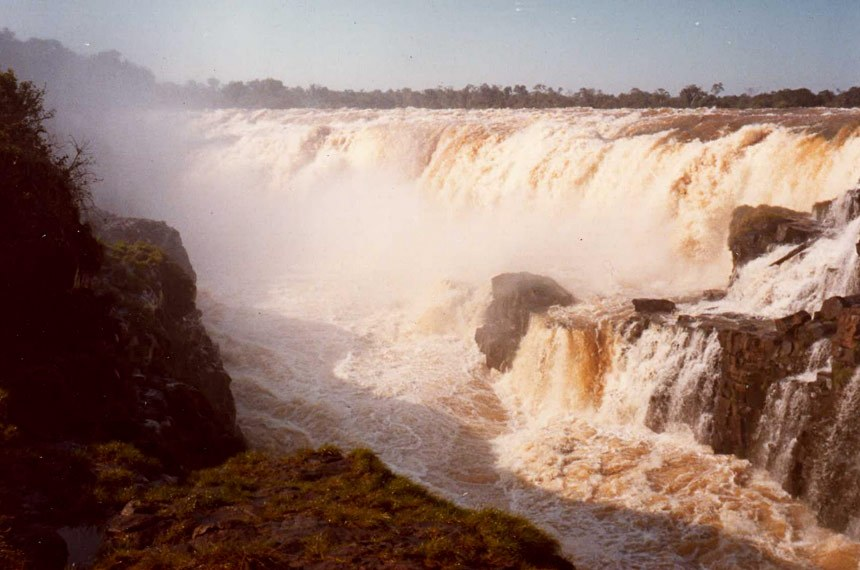
- The falls prior to submersion in 1982.

- Location within Paraná Location within Brazil
- Location: Border between Paraguay and Brazil
- Coordinates: 24°04′23″S 54°17′01″W
- Type: block
- Total height: 114 m (375 ft)
- Number of drops: 19 total, 7 primary
- Watercourse: Paraná River
- Average flow rate: 13,000 m^{3}/s (470,000 cu ft/s)

The Guairá Falls (Spanish: Saltos del Guairá) or Guaíra Falls (Portuguese: Salto das Sete Quedas do Guaíra) were a series of immense waterfalls on the Paraná River along the border between Paraguay and Brazil. The falls ceased to exist in 1982 when they were inundated by the impoundment of the Itaipu Dam reservoir. While published figures vary, ranging from 13,000 m^{3} (470,000 cu ft) per second to 50,000 m^{3} (1,750,000 cu ft) per second, Guaíra's flow rate was among the greatest of any then-existing falls on Earth.

The falls comprised 18 cataracts clustered in seven groups—hence their Portuguese name, Sete Quedas (Seven Falls)—near the Brazilian municipality of Guaíra, Paraná and Salto del Guairá, the easternmost city in Paraguay. The falls were located at a point where the Paraná River was forced through a narrow gorge. At the head of the falls, the river narrowed sharply from a width of about 380 m (1,250 ft) to 60 m (200 ft). The total height of the falls was approximately 114 m (375 ft), while the largest individual cataract was 40 m (130 ft) high. The roar of the plunging water could be heard from 30 km (20 mi) away.

== Submergence ==
A tourist attraction and a favorite of locals, the falls were completely submerged under the artificial lake created by the Itaipu Dam upon its completion in 1982. The building of the dam, authorized by a 1973 bilateral agreement between the Paraguayan and Brazilian regimes of the time, marked a new era of cooperation between the countries, both of which had claimed ownership of Guaíra Falls.

As construction of the Itaipu Dam progressed, thousands of visitors flocked to the area to see the falls before they disappeared forever. Disaster struck on January 17, 1982, when a suspended footbridge affording access to a particularly spectacular view of the falls collapsed, killing dozens of tourists.

Brazilian poet Carlos Drummond de Andrade wrote a poem expressing his dismay at the destruction of Guaíra Falls. Set in large type, the poem filled an entire page in the Jornal do Brasil newspaper:

Here seven visions, seven liquid sculptures
vanished through the computerized calculations
of a country ceasing to be human
in order to become a chilly corporation, nothing more.
A movement becomes a dam.
—Carlos Drummond de Andrade, "Farewell to Seven Falls" (excerpt, translated from the Portuguese)

Earlier, as the waters began to rise, a demonstration took place, as hundreds of people gathered to participate in a quarup, an indigenous ritual of remembrance for the dead, in memory of the falls. The inundation took only 14 days, occurring during the rainy season when the level of the Paraná River was high. On October 27, 1982, the falls had vanished as the reservoir was fully formed and with only part of the rock face visible during years of drought.

The director of the company that built the dam was quoted as saying, "We're not destroying Seven Falls. We're just going to transfer it to Itaipu Dam, whose spillway will be a substitute for [the falls'] beauty".

== See also ==
- List of waterfalls
- List of waterfalls by flow rate
- Itaipu Lake

== Sources ==
- Brazil, Lonely Planet Guide, 4th Edition, c. 1998 Lonely Planet Publications, PO Box 617, Hawthorn, Victoria 3122, Australia
