= Linnyer Beatrys Ruiz Aylon =

Brazilian computer scientist

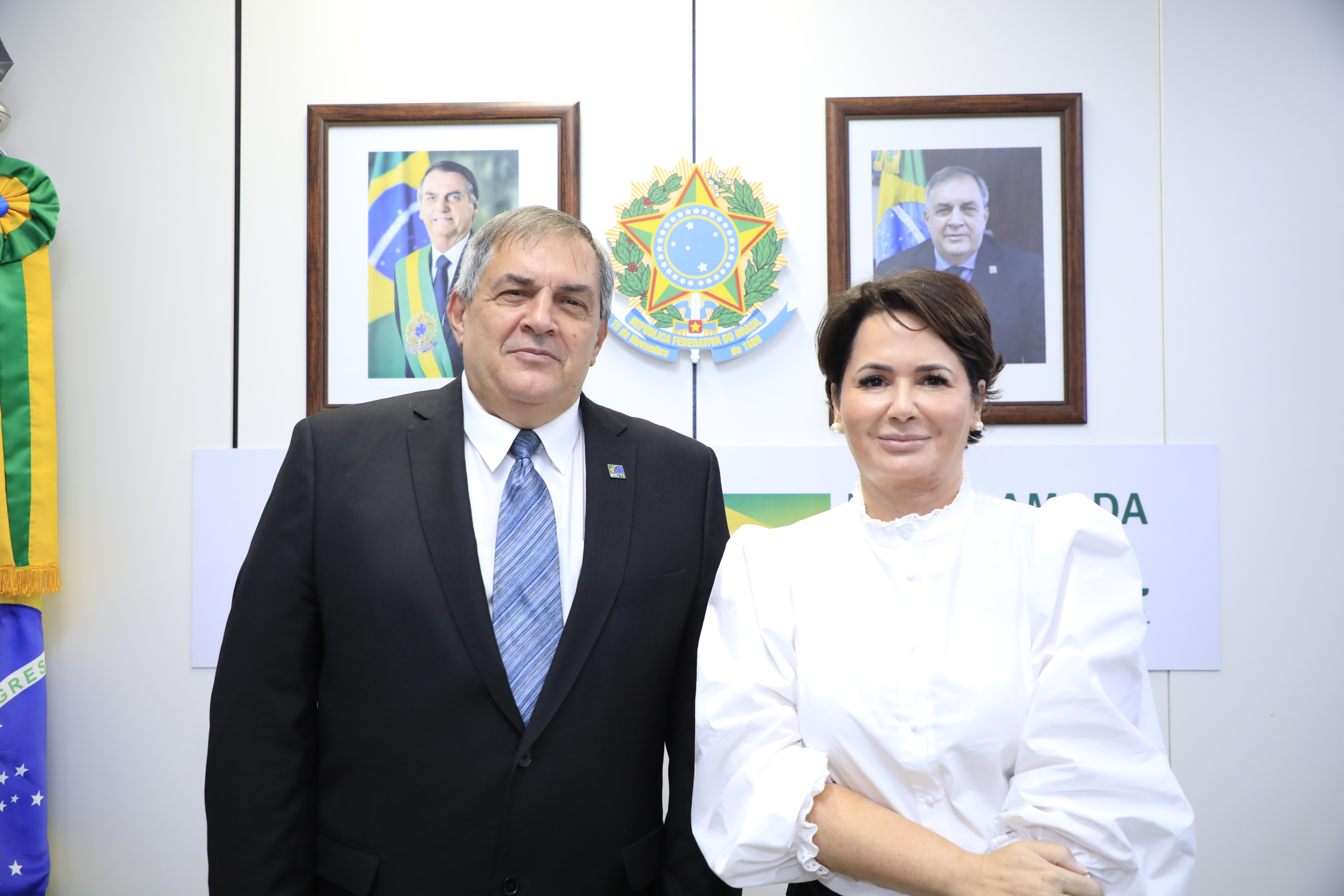
Linnyer Beatrys Ruiz Aylon (2022)

Linnyer Beatrys Ruiz Aylon is a Brazilian computer scientist known for her work on wireless sensor networks. She is a professor at the State University of Maringá, and the president of the Brazilian Society of Microelectronics (SBMicro).

== Education ==
Ruiz Aylon was born in Cianorte, where her father was a truck driver and later a lawyer. She earned a computer engineering degree at the Pontifical Catholic University of Paraná in 1993, a master's degree in electrical engineering and industrial informatics from the Federal University of Technology – Paraná in 1996, and a Ph.D. in computer science from the Federal University of Minas Gerais in 2000.

== Career ==
After postdoctoral research and an adjunct professorship at the Federal University of Minas Gerais, Ruiz Aylon joined the State University of Maringá in 2008.

She was elected president of SBMicro in 2020, for the 2020–2022 term, becoming the first female president of the society.

== Recognition ==
Ruiz was given the IEEE Women in Engineering Award in 2013.
