= Friendship Bridge (Brazil–Paraguay) =

Bridge between Brazil and Paraguay

- The Friendship Bridge, with Paraguay on left side and Brazil on the right side.
- Coordinates: 25°30′34.5″S 54°36′4.0″W
- Crosses: Paraná River
- Locale: Ciudad del Este, Paraguay and Foz do Iguaçu, Brazil
- Preceded by: Ayrton Senna Bridge
- Followed by: San Roque González de Santa Cruz Bridge

Characteristics
- Design: Arch bridge
- Total length: 552.4 metres (1,812 ft)
- Longest span: 290 metres (951 ft)

History
- Opened: 27 March 1965

Location
- Interactive map of Friendship Bridge

The Friendship Bridge (Spanish: Puente de la Amistad, Portuguese: Ponte da Amizade) is an arch bridge connecting the Brazilian city of Foz do Iguaçu and the Paraguayan city of Ciudad del Este.

== History and importance ==
Paraguayan President Alfredo Stroessner (right) and Brazilian President Humberto de Alencar Castelo Branco, during the opening ceremonies of the Friendship Bridge on 27 March 1965.

The bridge construction treaty was signed on May 29, 1956, by the governments of Brazil and Paraguay. On November 14, 1956, the commission responsible for the project's design and execution was established. At the time of its construction in 1962, the bridge held the world record for the longest span for a reinforced concrete, fixed-arch bridge, at 290 meters.

The bridge is very important to the economies of both Foz do Iguaçu and Ciudad del Este. More than 40,000 vehicles cross the bridge each day.

BR-277 begins immediately after the end of the bridge in the Brazilian side, and National Route N° 7 in the Paraguayan side.

== Smuggling ==
The Friendship Bridge is a major point for smuggling in the region, with Brazilians coming to purchase goods from Paraguay as Paraguay does not impose tariffs on foreign goods. Brazil has been imposing stricter border security to try and crack down on it.

== See also ==
- Brazil–Paraguay border
- List of international bridges
