= Ayrton Senna Bridge =

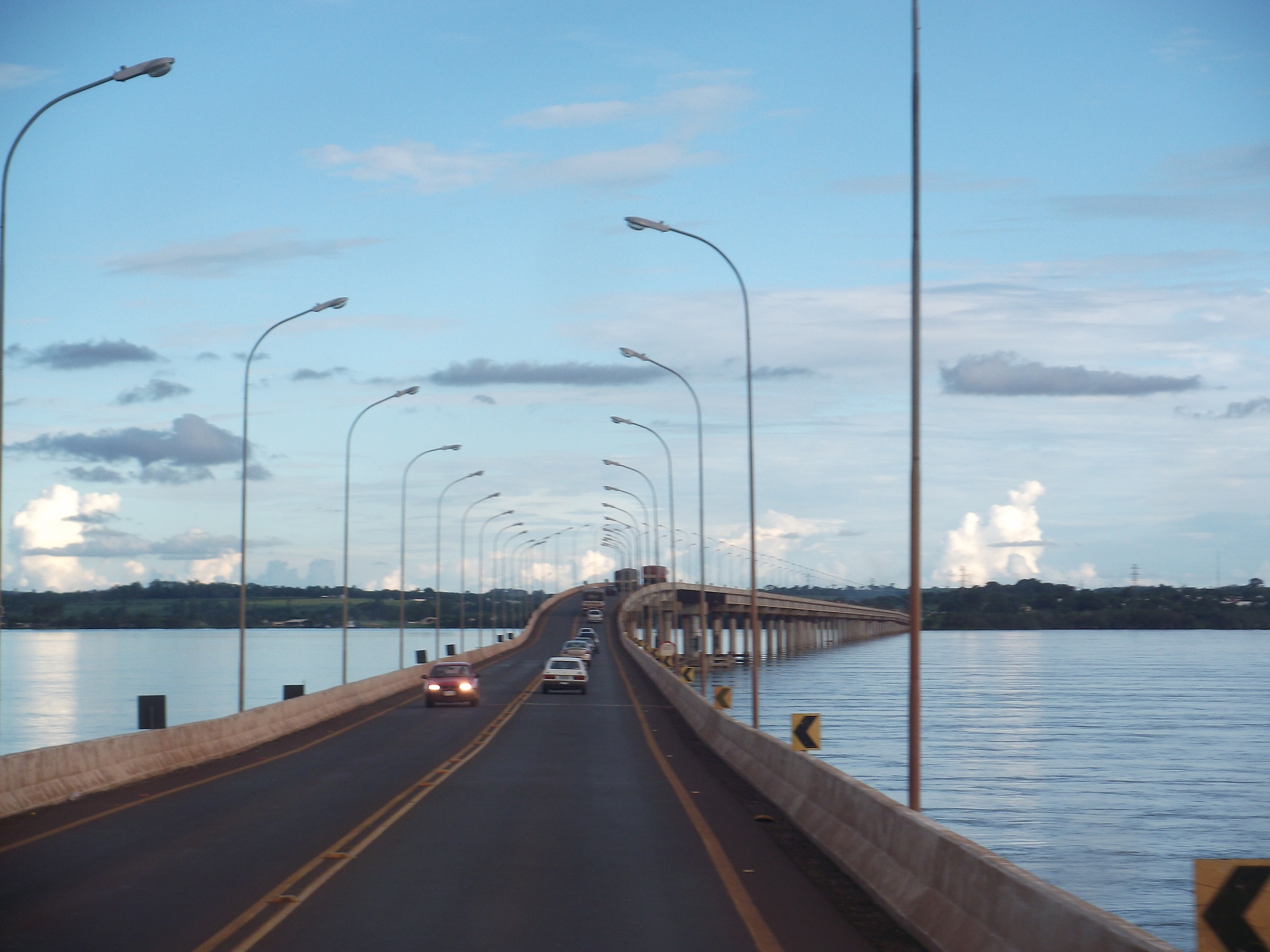
- Coordinates: 24°4′19″S 54°14′50″W
- Carries: BR-163
- Crosses: Rio Paraná
- Locale: Guaíra and Mundo Novo, Brazil
- Preceded by: Porto Camargo Bridge
- Followed by: Friendship Bridge

History
- Opened: 24 Jan 1998

Location
- Interactive map of Ayrton Senna Bridge

The Ayrton Senna bridge is a bridge over the Rio Paraná in Brazil. It was inaugurated on 24 January 1998 and cost R$32 million. It carries the BR-163 trunk road from Guaíra in Paraná to Mundo Novo in Mato Grosso do Sul.
The bridge is named after Brazilian racing driver, Ayrton Senna.
