= Santa Maria Ecological Corridor =

- Corredor Ecológico de Santa Maria
- Location within Brazil
- Nearest city: Santa Terezinha de Itaipu, Paraná
- Coordinates: 25°28′14″S 54°21′17″W
- Designation: Ecological corridor
- Created: 10 October 2001

The Santa Maria Ecological Corridor (Portuguese: Corredor Ecológico de Santa Maria) is an ecological corridor in the state of Paraná, Brazil.

== Location ==
The Santa Maria Ecological Corridor crosses the municipalities of Santa Terezinha de Itaipu and São Miguel do Iguaçu in Paraná. It connects the Iguaçu National Park in Brazil, which adjoins the Iguazú National Park in Argentina, with the protected margins of Lake Itaipu, and via these margins with the Ilha Grande National Park.

The corridor consists of the Apepú River basin, the Fazenda Santa Maria Private Natural Heritage Reserve (RPPN), the Fazenda Santa Maria, the Bonito River Basin and its connection with the protected areas of Itaipu. The corridor runs for about 15 kilometres (9.3 mi) from the Iguaçu National Park to the lake protection strip. It is about 12 kilometres (7.5 mi) from south to north. It covers the banks of the Apepú river, which rises in the RPPN and flows south into the Iguaçu National Park. From the RPPN a narrow corridor runs north in a straight line for about 3 kilometres (1.9 mi) to the headwaters of the Bonito River, which flows north into the Lake Itaipu.

== Environment ==
This corridor connects several remnants of seasonal semi-deciduous forest in south-western Paraná with reforested areas. The forest remnants are in the Iguaçu National Park, the Fazenda São José Legal Reserve and the Fazenda Santa Maria RPPN. The reforested areas are the Dry Range (Faixa Seca) and the Lake Itaipu Protection Range. The Fazenda São José Legal Reserve contains secondary growth forest. The Fazenda Santa Maria RPPN has 242 hectares (600 acres) of mature Atlantic Forest. The Faixa Seca is a reforested area about 4 kilometres (2.5 mi) long and 60 metres (200 ft) wide, the same width as a riparian forest, but with no watercourse. The riparian forests bordering the Bonito River have suffered severe degradation and are undergoing a natural forest recovery process.

== History ==
The Santa Maria Ecological Corridor was created by Brazilian Institute of Environment and Renewable Natural Resources (IBAMA) ordnance 195 of 10 October 2001. The objectives are to link areas of biological importance to support gene flow of flora and fauna, to increase awareness and environmental education, and to develop research into environmental recovery and conservation. The corridor was created through a partnership of government and civil society organizations and individuals. Participation of the local farmers was critical to project success.

Starting in 2003, fragments of forest covering 902 hectares (2,230 acres) were preserved and connected. Forest recovery was undertaken in 73.3 hectares (181 acres) with the planting of 128,000 seedlings of 70 native species of tree. 68 kilometres (42 mi) of fencing was erected.

== Sources ==
- Corredor de Biodiversidade (in Portuguese), Itaipu Binacional
- Marcon, Thaís Regina; Temponi, Lívia Godinho; Gris, Darlene; Fortes, Andréa Maria Teixeira (2013), "Guia ilustrado de Leguminosae Juss. arbóreas do Corredor de Biodiversidade Santa Maria – PR", Biota Neotropica, 13 (3)
- Teixeira, Cristiano (5 April 2016), Corredor Ecológico de Santa Maria, Paraná - Brasil (PDF) (in Portuguese), Asunción: ITAIPU Binacional/MI, archived from the original (PDF) on 2016-11-05
