= Federal University of Technology – Paraná =

Federal university in the state of Paraná, Brazil

- Universidade Tecnológica Federal do Paraná
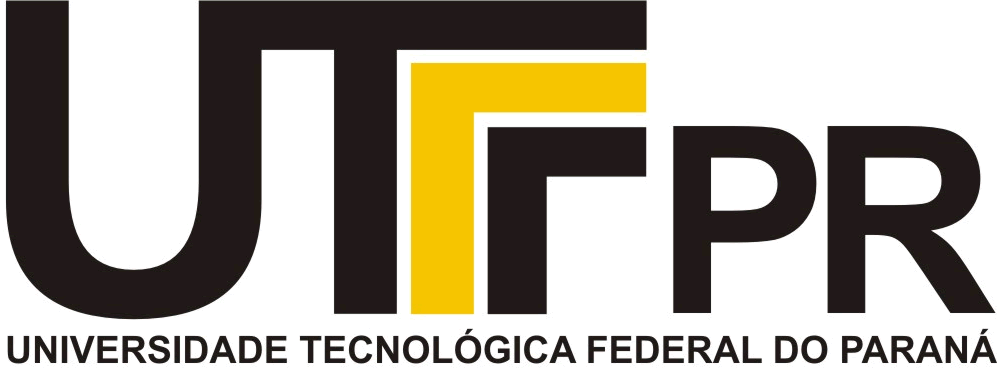
- Other name: UTFPR
- Motto: Tecnologia e Humanismo (Portuguese)
- Motto in English: Technology and Humanism
- Type: Public, state assisted
- Established: September 23, 1909 (School of Apprentices); October 7, 2005 (University)
- Rector: Everton Ricardi Lozano da Silva
- Faculty: 1,697 (Headcount)
- Students: 21,092
- Location: Apucarana, Campo Mourão, Cornélio Procópio, Curitiba, Dois Vizinhos, Francisco Beltrão, Guarapuava, Londrina, Medianeira, Ponta Grossa, Pato Branco, Santa Helena and Toledo, Paraná, Brazil; 25.43925°S 49.268833°W
- Colors: Yellow and black
- Website: www.utfpr.edu.br

The Federal University of Technology – Paraná (Portuguese: Universidade Tecnológica Federal do Paraná, UTFPR) is a federal university with campuses in thirteen cities located in the state of Paraná.

UTFPR is one of the most renowned Universities in Brazil. Their teaching pattern is inspired by the European polytechnic university model. It specializes in natural sciences and engineering.

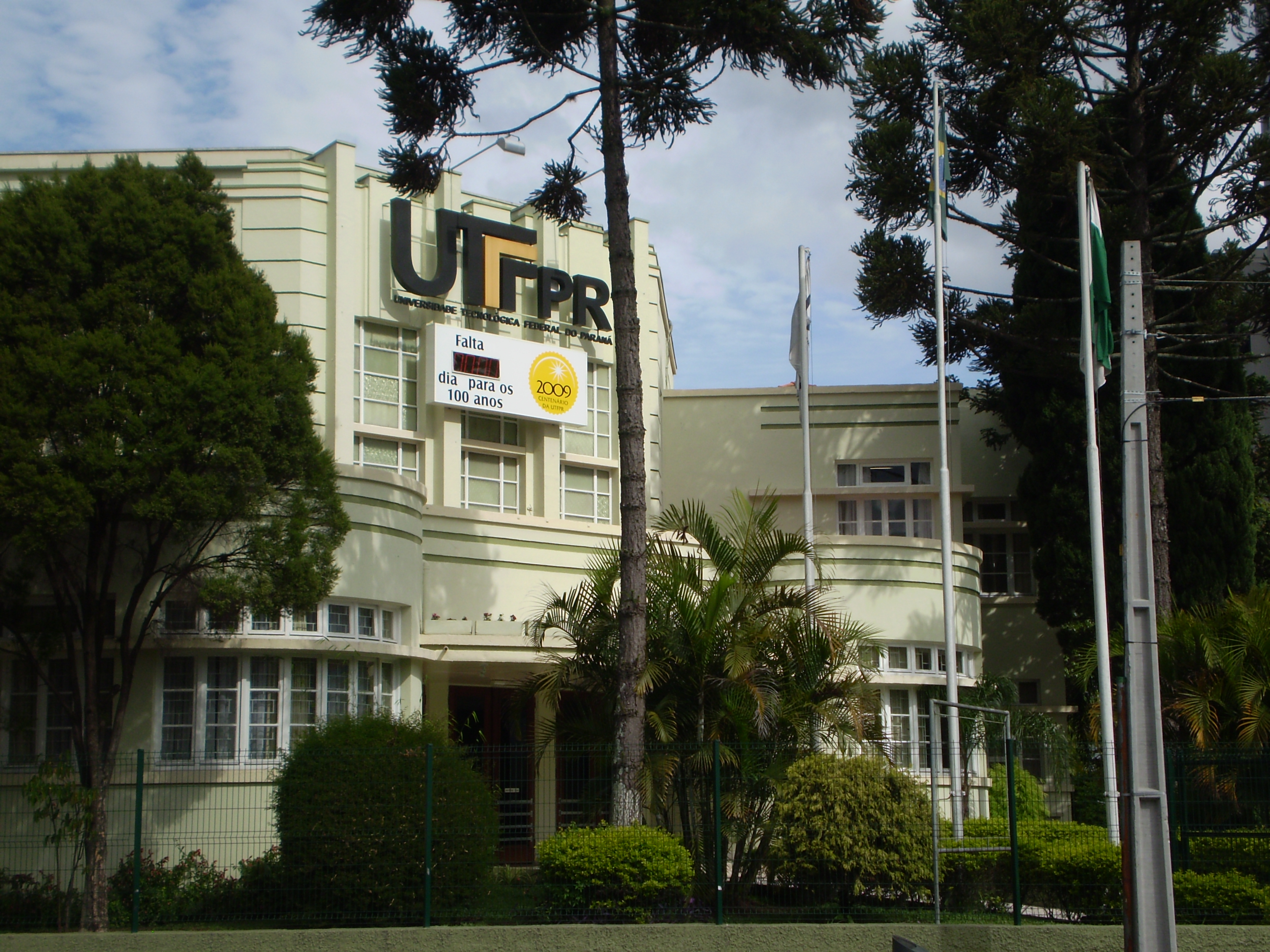
UTFPR - Curitiba

== Campi ==
The campi are located in the following cities:

- Apucarana
- Campo Mourão
- Cornélio Procópio
- Curitiba (flagship)
- Dois Vizinhos
- Francisco Beltrão
- Guarapuava
- Londrina
- Medianeira
- Ponta Grossa
- Pato Branco
- Santa Helena
- Toledo

== History ==
On September 23, 1909, the President of Brazil, Nilo Peçanha created the Escolas de Aprendizes e Artífices (Schools of Apprentices and Artificers), in the Paraná state this school started on January 16, 1910, named Escola de Aprendizes e Artífices do Paraná (School of Apprentices and Artificers of Paraná).

Two decades later, it started acting as a basic education school and was renamed Industrial Lyceum of Curitiba (Portuguese: Liceu Industrial de Curitiba) in 1937. Later it was instituted together with federal industrial schools, renamed Technical School of Curitiba (Portuguese: Escola Técnica de Curitiba) in 1942 and then to Federal Technical School of Paraná (Portuguese: Escola Técnica Federal do Paraná) in 1959.

In 1978 it became a Federal Center of Technological Education, and was renamed the Federal Center of Technological Education of Paraná (Centro Federal de Educação Tecnológica do Paraná, shortened CEFET-PR).

On October 7, 2005, president Luiz Inácio Lula da Silva transformed it into the first Federal University of Technology in Brazil, renamed Federal University of Technology – Paraná (Portuguese: Universidade Tecnológica Federal do Paraná, shortened UTFPR). It still acts as a technical high school, classified as the best of Paraná, according to the Brazilian education index ENEM. And today is the best federal university in the state according to the Ministry of Education (MEC).

Year	Portuguese name	English name
1909	Escola de Aprendizes Artífices do Paraná	Paraná's Schools of Apprentices and Artificers
1937	Liceu Industrial do Paraná	Paraná's Industrial Lyceum
1942	Escola Técnica de Curitiba	Curitiba's Technical School
1959	Escola Técnica Federal do Paraná	Paraná's Federal Technical School
1978	Centro Federal de Educação Tecnológica do Paraná	Paraná's Federal Center of Technological Education
2005	Universidade Tecnológica Federal do Paraná	Federal University of Technology – Paraná

== Degrees ==
UTFPR offers Licentiate, Bachelor, Bachelor of Engineering and technology degrees.

=== Curitiba ===
Those are the degrees offered by the UTFPR campus in Curitiba.

==== Licentiate ====
- Physics
- Languages and literatures (English)
- Chemistry

==== Bachelor ====
- Design
- Architecture & Urban Planning
- Information systems
- Physical education
- Administration
- Organizational communication
- Chemistry

==== Engineering ====
- Electrical engineering branch
  - Electronic engineering
  - Electrical engineering
  - Control engineering
  - Computer engineering
- Mechanical engineering branch
  - Mechanical engineering
  - Mechatronics engineering
  - Production engineering
- Civil engineering branch
  - Civil engineering
  - Environmental and Sanitary engineering

==== Technology ====
- Institutional communication
- Concrete technology
- Graphic design
- Electrical commercial management
- Manufacture management
- Industrial mechatronics
- Environmental management
- Radiology
- Telecommunications
- Internet systems

=== Londrina ===
Those are the degrees offered by the UTFPR campus in Londrina.

==== Licentiate ====
- Chemistry

==== Engineering ====
- Materials engineering
- Environmental engineering
- Chemical engineering
- Mechanical engineering
- Production engineering

==== Technology ====
- Food technology

=== Medianeira ===
Those are the degrees offered by the UTFPR campus in Medianeira.

==== Bachelor ====
- Computer science

==== Licentiate ====
- Chemistry

==== Engineering ====
- Electrical engineering
- Industrial engineering
- Food engineering
- Environmental engineering
- Mechanical engineering

==== Technology ====
- Food technology
- Industrial maintenance
- Environmental management

=== Pato Branco ===
Those are the degrees offered by the UTFPR campus in Pato Branco.

==== Licentiate ====
- Mathematics
- Languages and literatures (English)

==== Bachelor ====
- Administration
- Agronomy
- Accountancy
- Chemistry

==== Engineering ====
- Computer engineering
- Civil engineering
- Mechanical engineering
- Electrical engineering

==== Technology ====
- System development and analysis
- Industrial maintenance

=== Ponta Grossa ===
Those are the degrees offered by the UTFPR campus in Ponta Grossa.

==== Bachelor ====
- Computer science

==== Engineering ====
- Mechanical engineering
- Industrial engineering
- Chemical engineering
- Electrical engineering
- Bioprocess engineering

==== Technology ====
- Food technology
- Industrial automation
- System Analysis and Development
- Mechanical manufacture

=== Dois Vizinhos ===
These are the degrees offered by the UTFPR campus in Dois Vizinhos

==== Bachelor ====
- Agronomy
- Animal Science
- Software Engineering
- Bioprocess Engineering and Biotechnology

==== Licentiate ====
- Biological Sciences
- Rural Education (no longer offered)

==== Engineering ====
- Forestry

==== Technology ====
- Horticulture (no longer offered)

=== Santa Helena ===
Those are the degrees offered by the UTFPR campus in Santa Helena.

==== Licentiate ====
- Biological Sciences

==== Bachelor ====
- Computer science
- Agronomy

=== Campo Mourão ===
Those are the degrees offered by the UTFPR campus in Campo Mourão.

==== Licentiate ====
- Chemistry

==== Bachelor ====
- Computer science

==== Engineering ====
- Electronic engineering
- Environmental engineering
- Chemical engineering
- Civil engineering
- Food engineering

==== Technology ====
- Food technology

=== Francisco Beltrão ===
Those are the degrees offered by the UTFPR campus in Francisco Beltrão.

==== Licentiate ====
- Informatics

==== Bachelor ====
- Agronomy (to start in 2022)

==== Engineering ====
- Environmental and Sanitary engineering
- Chemical engineering
- Food engineering

==== Technology ====
- Food technology (no longer offered)

== See also ==
- List of federal universities of Brazil
- Federal Institute of Education, Science and Technology
- Federal Centers for Technological Education
