= Boa Esperança do Iguaçu =

Coordinates: 25.6358°S 53.2119°W

- Municipality
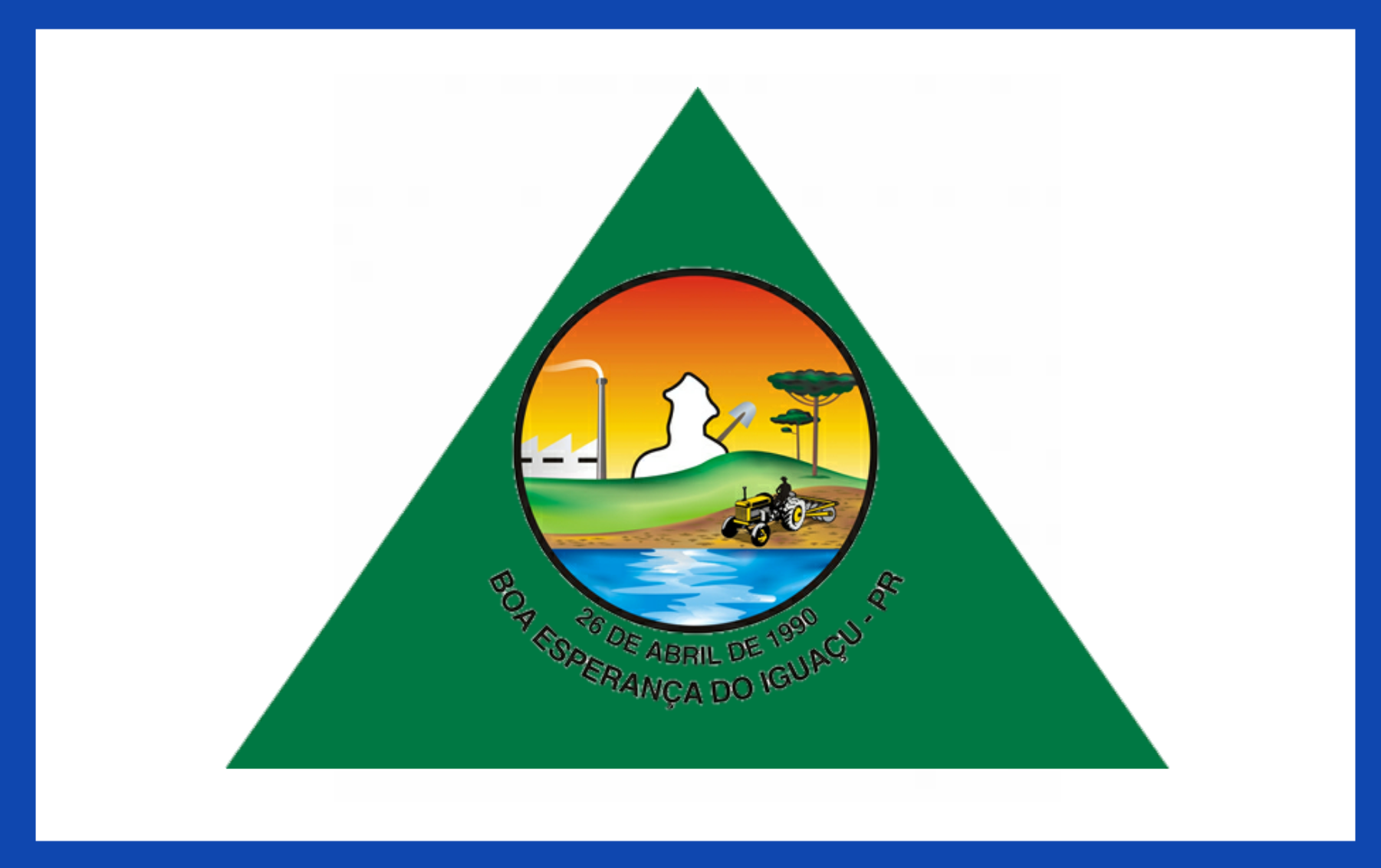
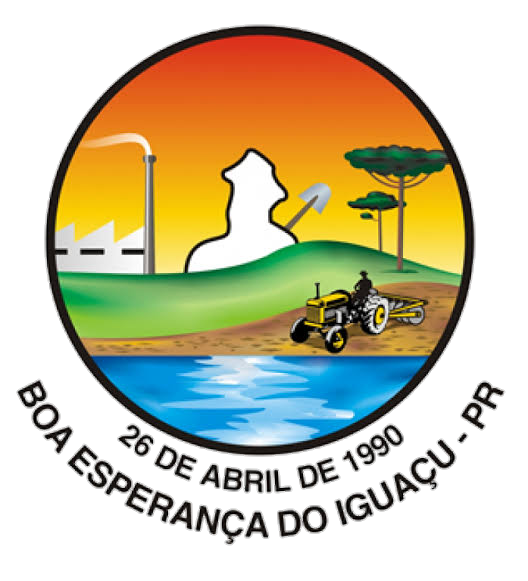
- Flag Coat of arms
- Interactive map of Boa Esperança do Iguaçu
- Country: Brazil
- Region: Southern
- State: Paraná
- Mesoregion: Sudoeste Paranaense

Population (2020)
  - Total: 2,470
- Time zone: UTC−3 (BRT)

Boa Esperança do Iguaçu is a municipality in the state of Paraná in the Southern Region of Brazil.

== See also ==
- List of municipalities in Paraná
