= Mercedes, Paraná =

Coordinates: 24°27′14″S 54°09′43″W

- Municipality
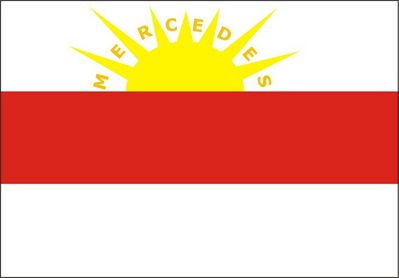
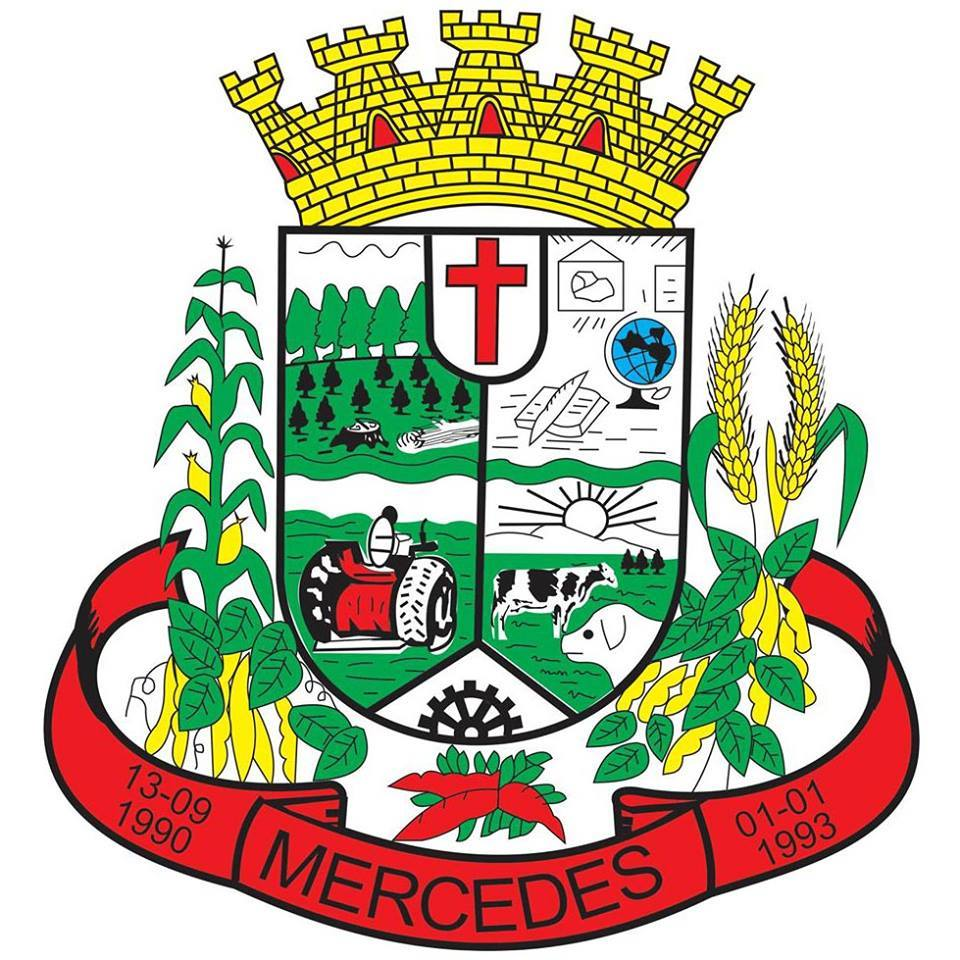
- Flag Coat of arms
- Interactive map of Mercedes, Paraná
- Country: Brazil
- Region: Southern
- State: Paraná
- Mesoregion: Oeste Paranaense

Population (2020)
  - Total: 5,577
- Time zone: UTC−3 (BRT)

Mercedes is a municipality in the state of Paraná in the Southern Region of Brazil.

== See also ==
- List of municipalities in Paraná
