= Bridge law =

Body of legislation

Bridge law is the body of laws which apply to bridges in a particular jurisdiction.

== United States ==
In the United States, legislative authority to erect a bridge is necessary in three cases: first, when a toll is demanded for its use—the right to take toll being a franchise which cannot be claimed without express grant from the state; second, when the state owns the bed of the stream over which the bridge extends, as is the case in all public or navigable streams; third, when the structure interferes or threatens to interfere with navigation.

In the last case the authority of state governments is subject to the power given to Congress by the Federal Constitution to "regulate commerce with foreign nations, and among the several states." The states may authorize bridges over navigable streams, and may regulate their size, form, and manner of construction. Until Congress intervenes in such cases, the power of the states is unlimited. When it does intervene, however, its will is supreme, and its legislation, within the limits of the constitutional grant, overrides that of any state. A bridge constructed over a navigable river in accordance with an act of Congress is a lawful structure, however much it may interfere with the public right of navigation. For example, President Franklin D. Roosevelt stopped Robert Moses from building the Battery Crossing, officially out of concern about blocking navigational access to the Brooklyn Navy Yard, but actually as an act of revenge, and instead forced building the Brooklyn-Battery Tunnel.

== See also ==
- Bridges Act
- Federal Bridge Gross Weight Formula
