= Diamante d'Oeste =

Coordinates: 24.9428°S 54.1028°W

- Municipality
- Interactive map of Diamante d'Oeste
- Country: Brazil
- Region: Southern
- State: Paraná
- Mesoregion: Oeste Paranaense

Population (2020)
  - Total: 5,266
- Time zone: UTC−3 (BRT)

Diamante d'Oeste is a municipality in the state of Paraná in the Southern Region of Brazil.

== See also ==
- List of municipalities in Paraná
