= São Miguel do Iguaçu =

Coordinates: 25°21′S 54°10′W

- Municipality
- Flag Coat of arms
- Interactive map of São Miguel do Iguaçu
- Country: Brazil
- Region: Southern
- State: Paraná
- Mesoregion: Oeste Paranaense

Population (2020)
  - Total: 27,576
- Time zone: UTC−3 (BRT)

São Miguel do Iguaçu is a municipality in the state of Paraná in the Southern Region of Brazil.

The municipality contains part of the Santa Maria Ecological Corridor, created in 2001.

== Climate ==
Climate data for São Miguel do Iguaçu, elevation 260 m (850 ft), (1976–2005 normals, extremes 1983–1997)
Month	Jan	Feb	Mar	Apr	May	Jun	Jul	Aug	Sep	Oct	Nov	Dec	Year
Record high °C (°F)	38.0 (100.4)	37.6 (99.7)	36.6 (97.9)	34.8 (94.6)	32.8 (91.0)	30.2 (86.4)	30.8 (87.4)	36.4 (97.5)	36.4 (97.5)	37.2 (99.0)	39.7 (103.5)	39.9 (103.8)	39.9 (103.8)
Mean daily maximum °C (°F)	31.9 (89.4)	31.1 (88.0)	30.6 (87.1)	28.0 (82.4)	24.6 (76.3)	22.2 (72.0)	22.4 (72.3)	24.4 (75.9)	26.3 (79.3)	28.4 (83.1)	30.4 (86.7)	31.4 (88.5)	27.6 (81.8)
Daily mean °C (°F)	25.8 (78.4)	24.9 (76.8)	24.3 (75.7)	22.0 (71.6)	18.8 (65.8)	16.2 (61.2)	16.0 (60.8)	17.6 (63.7)	19.6 (67.3)	22.0 (71.6)	24.0 (75.2)	25.3 (77.5)	21.4 (70.5)
Mean daily minimum °C (°F)	21.2 (70.2)	20.7 (69.3)	19.7 (67.5)	17.7 (63.9)	14.6 (58.3)	12.1 (53.8)	11.5 (52.7)	12.6 (54.7)	14.6 (58.3)	16.9 (62.4)	18.8 (65.8)	20.2 (68.4)	16.7 (62.1)
Record low °C (°F)	13.3 (55.9)	10.1 (50.2)	7.6 (45.7)	6.0 (42.8)	0.7 (33.3)	−0.2 (31.6)	−1.2 (29.8)	−1.2 (29.8)	2.7 (36.9)	5.5 (41.9)	8.0 (46.4)	12.2 (54.0)	−1.2 (29.8)
Average precipitation mm (inches)	167.7 (6.60)	156.1 (6.15)	135.2 (5.32)	146.6 (5.77)	184.4 (7.26)	148.0 (5.83)	99.7 (3.93)	105.4 (4.15)	150.0 (5.91)	227.6 (8.96)	147.9 (5.82)	162.0 (6.38)	1,830.6 (72.08)
Average precipitation days (≥ 1.0 mm)	11	11	10	10	10	9	8	7	10	11	9	10	116
Average relative humidity (%)	75	77	75	78	80	81	77	71	69	70	68	70	74
Mean monthly sunshine hours	242.9	212.6	226.9	186.3	182.3	162.2	190.4	198.3	176.7	216.2	245.3	257.6	2,497.7
Source 1: Empresa Brasileira de Pesquisa Agropecuária (EMBRAPA)
Source 2: IDR-Paraná (precipitation days and sun 1983–1997)

== See also ==
- List of municipalities in Paraná
