= Itaipu (Glass) =

1989 cantata by Philip Glass

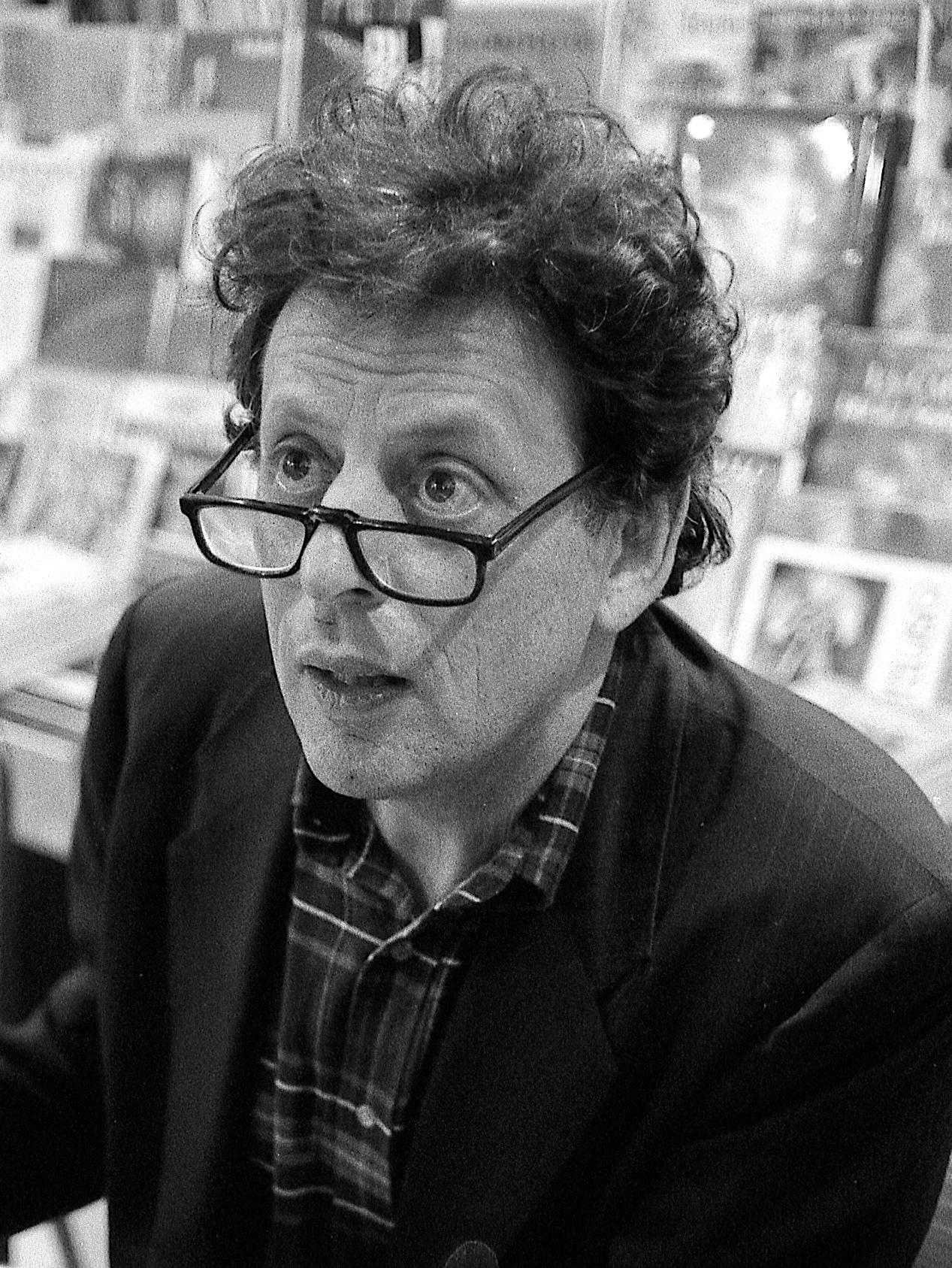
Philip Glass in 1993

Itaipu is a four-movement symphonic cantata by Philip Glass. The composition was written in 1989, and pays homage to the Itaipu Dam, the world's largest hydroelectric dam, built on the Paraná River between Paraguay and Brazil. The text is written in Guaraní, with a translation by Daniela Thomas. It was commissioned by the Atlanta Symphony Orchestra and Chorus and was first performed on November 2, 1989.

The four movements are:

1. Mato Grosso
2. The Lake
3. The Dam
4. To the Sea

== Instrumentation ==
Woodwinds
piccolo
2 flutes
3 oboes
3 clarinets in B♭
2 bassoons
contrabassoon

Brass
6 horns in F
4 trumpets in B♭
2 trombones
bass trombone
tuba

Percussion
tambourine
tubular bells
cowbell
maracas
triangle
wood block
cymbal
snare drum
tenor drum
bass drum

Mixed chorus

Keyboards
piano

Strings
2 harps

violins I
violins II
violas
cellos
double basses
