= Brazil–Paraguay border =

International border

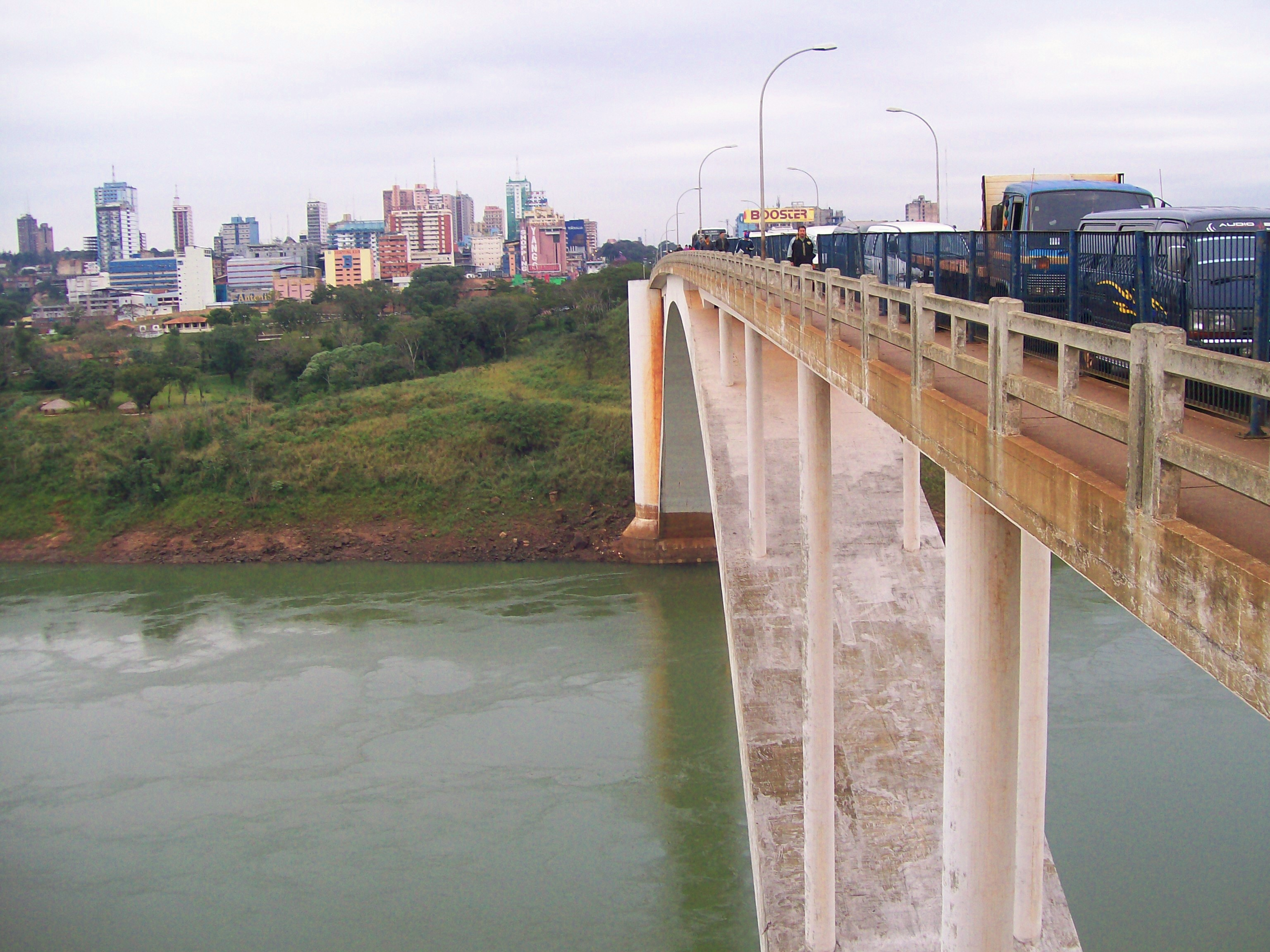
The International Friendship Bridge, located between Foz do Iguaçu (in Brazil) and Ciudad del Este (Paraguay), is the main symbol of the border between Brazil and Paraguay.

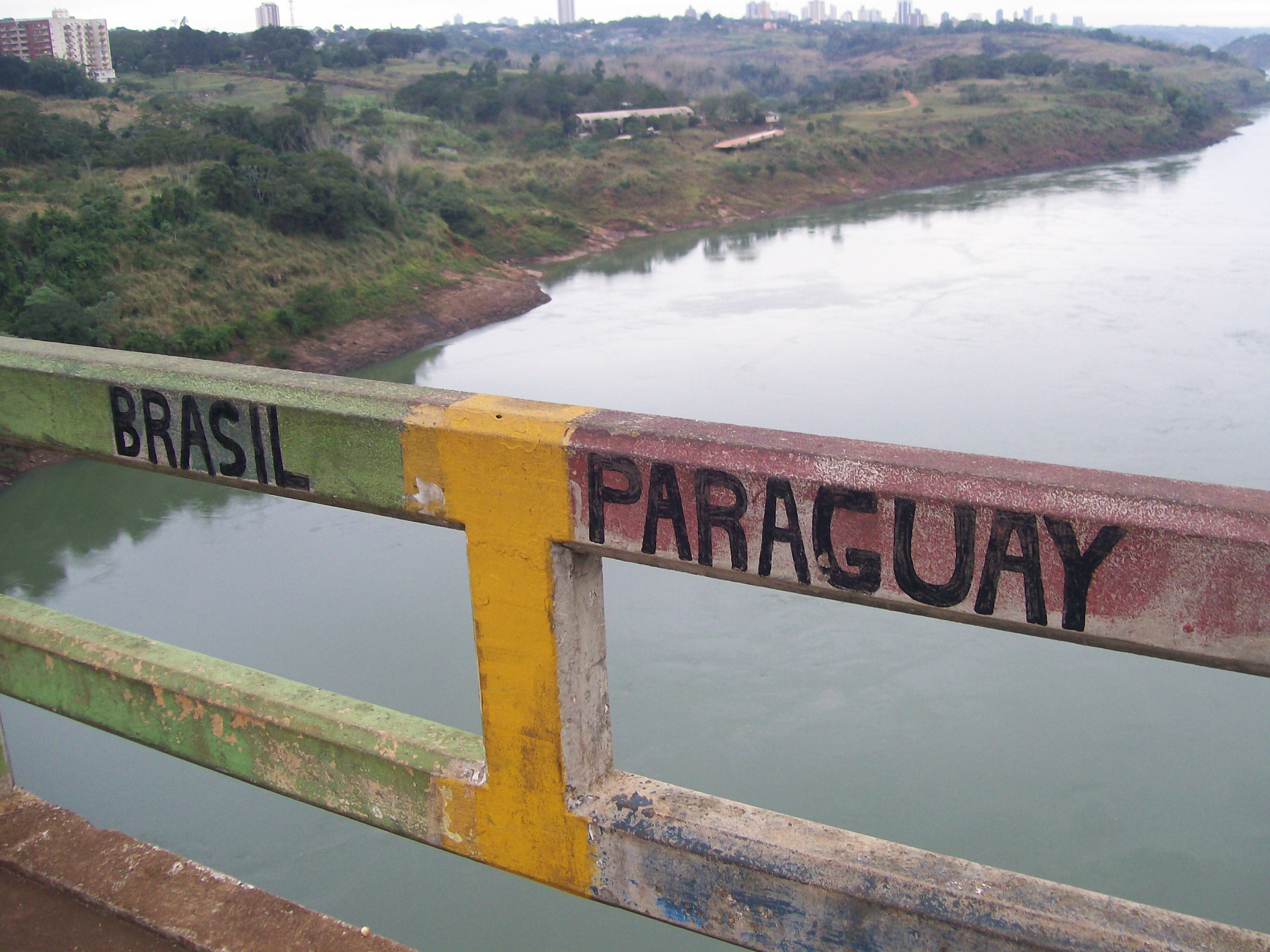
The exact point of the border line between Brazil and Paraguay, at the Friendship Bridge.

The Brazil–Paraguay border runs from Foz do Iguaçu, Paraná, to Corumbá, Mato Grosso do Sul. It crosses a variety of terrains, going from large urban areas by inhospitable deserts and wetlands. It starts within the framework of the three borders, between Foz do Iguaçu and President Franco and ends in the triple border with Bolivia, near the Paraguayan city of Bahía Negra. On the border between Brazil and Paraguay, lies the Itaipu Hydroelectric Power Plant, which is one of the largest hydroelectric plants in the world in terms of annual energy generation. The border's Friendship Bridge is the busiest crossing point between the two countries, passage is free.

== History ==
The fixation of the border took place after the Paraguayan War, when in 1872 was signed a peace treaty with Paraguay, which also contained their limits with Brazil, and that according to Helio Vianna, respected the covenants of the colonial era and claimed to Brazil only land already occupied or exploited by Portuguese and Brazilians.

== See also ==
- Borders of Brazil
- Borders of Paraguay
- Friendship Bridge (Brazil–Paraguay)
