= Itaipu Dam =

Dam along the Brazil–Paraguay border

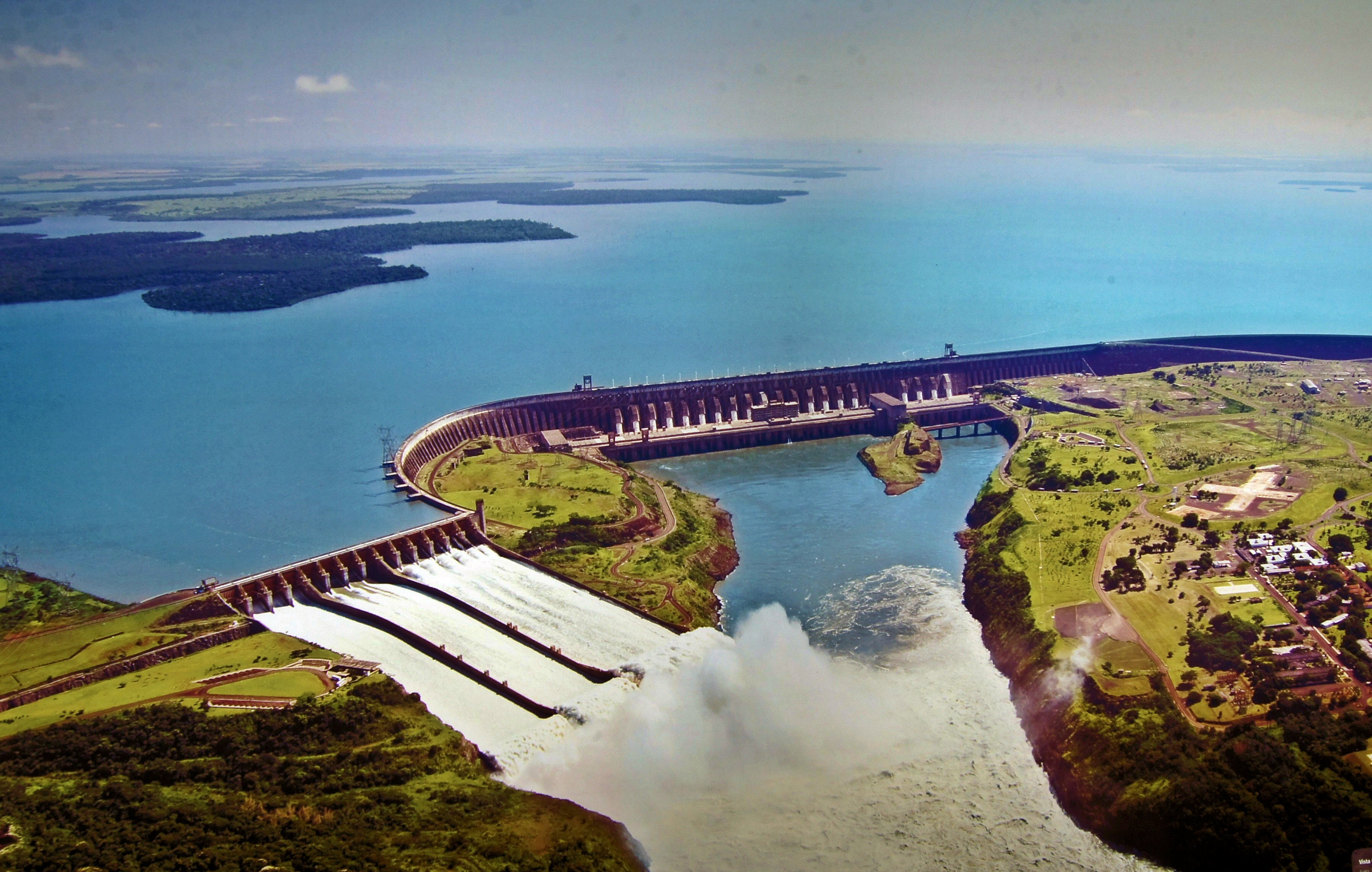
- The Itaipu Dam

- Location of the Dam Itaipu Dam (Brazil)
- Interactive map of Itaipu Dam
- Official name: Central Hidroeléctrica Itaipú Binacional; Usina Hidrelétrica Itaipu Binacional
- Country: Brazil; Paraguay
- Location: Foz do Iguaçu; Hernandarias
- Status: Operational
- Construction began: January 1971
- Opening date: 5 May 1984
- Construction cost: US$19.6 billion (equivalent to $60.7 billion today)
- Owners: Government of Brazil & Government of Paraguay

Dam and spillways
- Type of dam: Combination gravity, buttress and embankment sections
- Impounds: Paraná River
- Height: 196 m (643 ft), reinf. concrete Barrage at Rock side
- Length: 7,919 m (25,981 ft)
- Dam volume: 12,300,000 m^{3} (430,000,000 cu ft)
- Spillway capacity: 62,200 m^{3}/s (2,200,000 cu ft/s)

Reservoir
- Creates: Itaipu Reservoir
- Total capacity: 29 km^{3} (24,000,000 acre⋅ft)
- Catchment area: 1,350,000 km^{2} (520,000 sq mi)
- Surface area: 1,350 km^{2} (520 sq mi)
- Maximum length: 170 km (110 mi)
- Maximum width: 12 km (7.5 mi)

Power Station
- Type: Conventional
- Hydraulic head: 118 m (387 ft)
- Turbines: 20 × 700 MW (940,000 hp) Francis-type
- Installed capacity: 14 GW
- Capacity factor: 62.3% (2020)
- Annual generation: 83.879 TWh (301.96 PJ) (2023)
- Website www.itaipu.energy

The Itaipu Dam (Guarani: Yjoko Itaipu [itajˈpu]; Portuguese: Barragem de Itaipu [itajˈpu]; Spanish: Represa de Itaipú [itajˈpu]) is a hydroelectric dam on the Paraná River located on the border between Brazil and Paraguay.

The name "Itaipu" is from an island near the construction site, named in the Guarani language after the concept of a "sounding stone." As of 2020, the Itaipu Dam's hydroelectric power plant produced the second-largest amount of electricity of any hydroelectric power plant in the world, only surpassed by the Three Gorges Dam plant in China. Itaipu also holds the 45th largest reservoir in the world.

Following a 1973 treaty, Brazil and Paraguay started construction of the dam from 1970 to 1984, at the border between the two countries, 15 km (9.3 mi) north of the Friendship Bridge. The construction of the dam displaced 10,000 families, and flooded the Guaíra Falls, one of the largest waterfalls in the world.

The project ranges from Foz do Iguaçu, in Brazil, and Ciudad del Este in Paraguay, in the south to Guaíra and Salto del Guairá in the north. The installed generation capacity of the plant is 14 GW, with 20 generating units providing 700 MW each with a hydraulic design head of 118 metres (387 ft). In 2016, the plant employed 3,038 workers.

Of the twenty generator units currently installed, ten generate at 50 Hz for Paraguay and ten generate at 60 Hz for Brazil. Output of the Paraguayan generators exceeds the load in Paraguay, so most of their production is exported directly to the Brazilian side. Two 600 kV HVDC lines running 800 kilometres (500 mi) long carry the majority of the energy to Southeastern Brazil.

== History ==
=== Negotiations between Brazil and Paraguay ===
The concept behind the Itaipu Power Plant was the result of serious negotiations between the two countries during the 1960s. The "Ata do Iguaçu" (Iguaçu Act) was signed on July 22, 1966, by the Brazilian and Paraguayan Ministers of Foreign Affairs, Juracy Magalhães and Raúl Sapena Pastor. This was a joint declaration of the mutual interest in studying the exploitation of the hydro resources that the two countries shared in the section of the Paraná River starting from and including the Salto de Sete Quedas, to the Iguaçu River watershed. The treaty that gave origin to the power plant was signed in 1973.

The terms of the treaty, which expired in 2023, have been the subject of widespread discontent in Paraguay. The government of President Lugo vowed to renegotiate the terms of the treaty with Brazil, which long remained hostile to any renegotiation.

In 2009, Brazil agreed to a fairer payment of electricity to Paraguay and also allowed Paraguay to sell excess power directly to Brazilian companies instead of solely through the Brazilian electricity monopoly.

=== Construction starts ===
In 1970, the consortium formed by the companies ELC Electroconsult S.p.A. (from Italy) and IECO (from the United States) won the international competition for the realization of the viability studies and for the elaboration of the construction project. Design studies began in February 1971. On April 26, 1973, Brazil and Paraguay signed the Itaipu Treaty, the legal instrument for the hydroelectric exploitation of the Paraná River by the two countries. On May 17, 1974, the Itaipu Binacional entity was created to administer the plant's construction. The construction began in January of the following year. Brazil's (and Latin America's) first electric car was introduced in late 1974; it received the name Itaipu in honor of the project.

=== Paraná River rerouted ===
On October 14, 1978, the Paraná River had its route changed, which allowed a section of the riverbed to dry so the dam could be built there.

=== Agreement by Brazil, Paraguay, and Argentina ===
The construction of the dam was first contested by Argentina, but the negotiations and resolution of the dispute ended up setting the basis for Argentine–Brazilian integration later on. An important diplomatic settlement was reached with the signing of the Acordo Tripartite by Brazil, Paraguay, and Argentina, on October 19, 1979. This agreement established the allowed river levels and how much they could change as a result of the various hydroelectric undertakings in the watershed that was shared by the three countries.

=== Formation of the lake ===
The reservoir began its formation on October 13, 1982, when the dam works were completed and the side canal's gates were closed. Throughout this period, heavy rains and flooding accelerated the filling of the reservoir as the water rose 100 meters (330 feet) and reached the gates of the spillway on October 27.

=== Start of operations ===
On May 5, 1984, the first generation unit started running in Itaipu. The first 18 units were installed at the rate of two to three a year; the last two of these started running in the year 1991.

=== Capacity expansion in 2007 ===
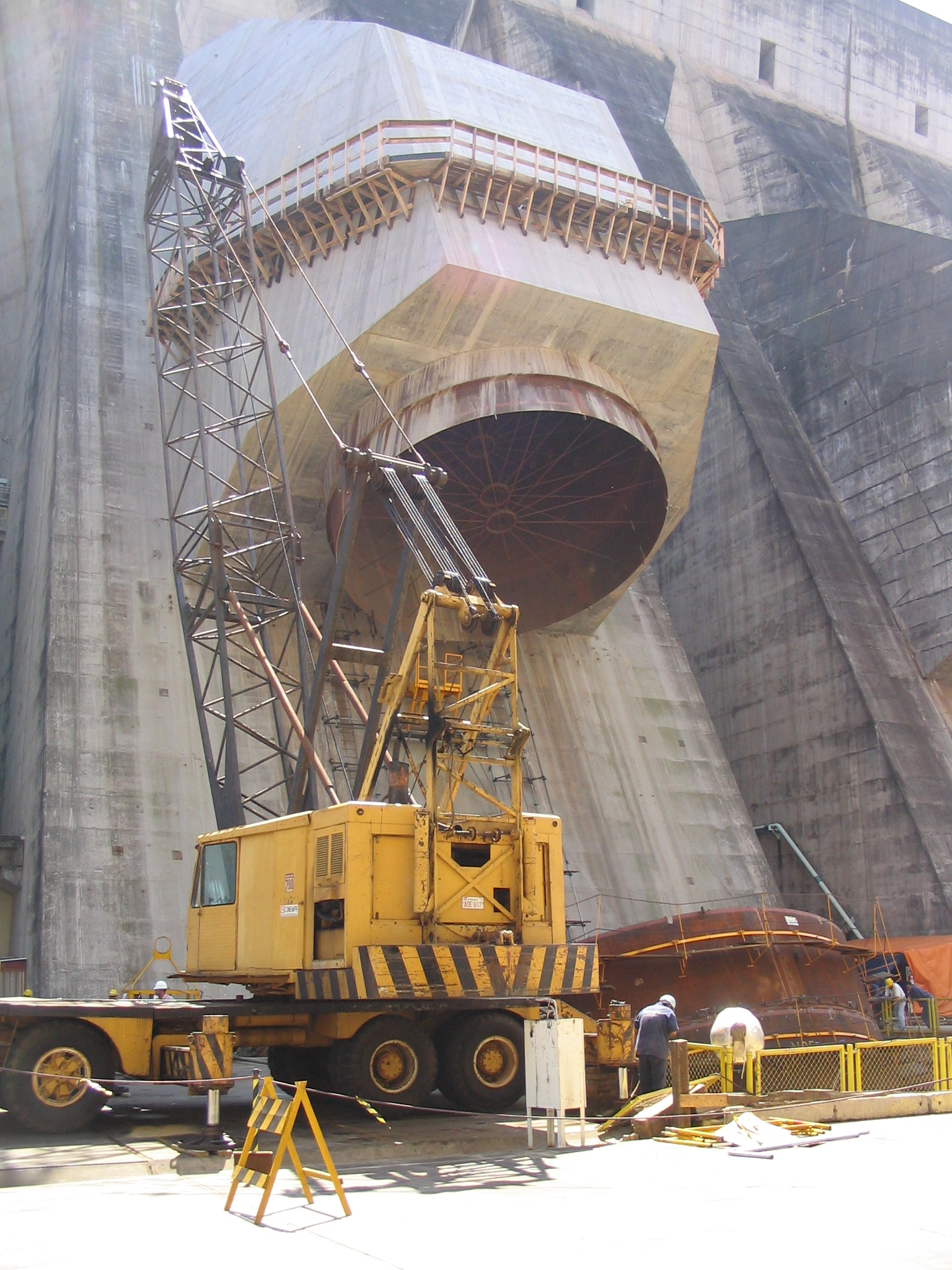
The dam undergoes expansion work.

The last two of the 20 electric generation units started operations in September 2006 and in March 2007, thus raising the installed capacity to 14 GW and completing the power plant. This increase in capacity allows 18 generation units to run permanently while two are shut down for maintenance. Due to a clause in the treaty signed between Brazil, Paraguay, and Argentina, the maximum number of generating units allowed to operate simultaneously cannot exceed 18 (see the agreement section for more information).

The rated nominal power of each generating unit (turbine and generator) is 700 MW. However, because the head (difference between reservoir level and the river level at the bottom of the dam) that actually occurs is higher than the designed head (118 m or 387 ft), the power available exceeds 750 MW half of the time for each generator. Each turbine generates around 700 MW; by comparison, all the water from the Iguaçu Falls would have the capacity to feed only two generators.

== November 2009 power failure ==
On November 10, 2009, transmission from the plant was completely disrupted, possibly due to a storm damaging up to three high-voltage transmission lines. Itaipu itself was not damaged. This caused massive power outages in Brazil and Paraguay, blacking out the entire country of Paraguay for 15 minutes, and plunging Rio de Janeiro and São Paulo into darkness for more than 2 hours. 50 million people were reportedly affected. The blackout occurred at 22:13 local time. It affected the southeast of Brazil most severely, leaving São Paulo, Rio de Janeiro, and Espírito Santo completely without electricity. Blackouts also swept through the interior of Rio Grande do Sul, Santa Catarina, Mato Grosso do Sul, Mato Grosso, the interior of Bahia, and parts of Pernambuco, energy officials said. By 00:30, power had been restored to most areas.

== Wonder of the Modern World ==
In 1994, the American Society of Civil Engineers elected the Itaipu Dam as one of the seven modern Wonders of the World. In 1995, the American magazine Popular Mechanics published the results.

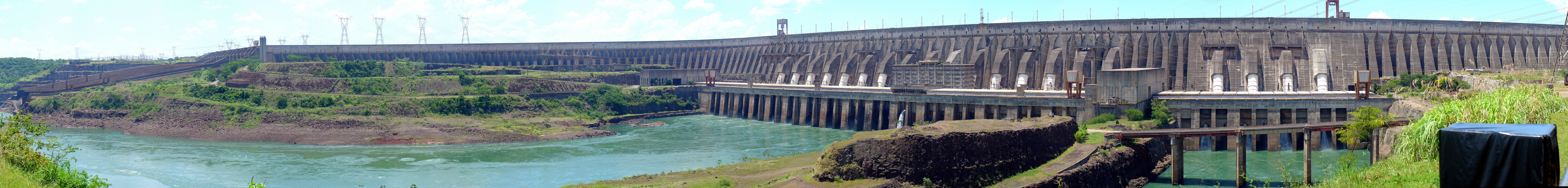
Panoramic view of the Itaipu Dam, with the spillways closed
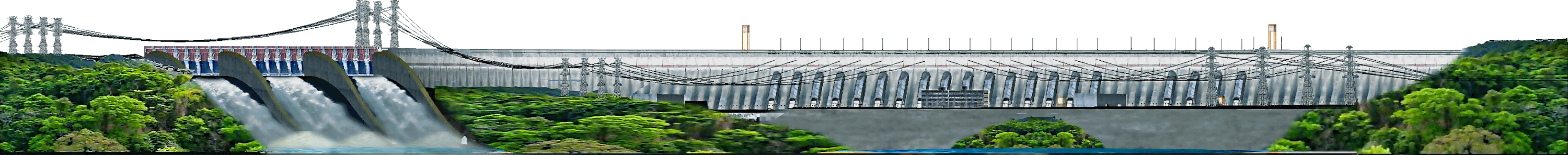
These diagrams show the heights in detail:

325 metres (1,066 ft), entire dam including the four 100 metres (330 ft) high Power Line Pylons atop the Barrage
260 metres (850 ft), dam barrage + the foundation inside water until the slope river floor
247 metres (810 ft), 196 metres (643 ft) high of roof reinforcement concrete barrage dam + Cranes atop the Barrage
225 metres (738 ft), Elevation End Main Concrete Barrage including all structures atop

196 metres (643 ft), The official roof given from Itaipú Binacional Webpage, which is only the section of Turbines

== Social and environmental impacts ==
=== Inundation impacts ===
When construction of the dam began in 1971, approximately 10,000 families living beside the Paraná River were displaced because of the construction.

The world's largest waterfall by volume, the Guaíra Falls, was inundated by the newly formed Itaipu reservoir. The Brazilian government later liquidated the Guaíra Falls National Park. A few months before the reservoir was filled, 80 people died when an overcrowded bridge overlooking the falls collapsed, as tourists sought a last glimpse of the falls.

==== Ecological legacy ====
The Guaíra Falls was an effective barrier that separated freshwater species in the upper Paraná basin (with its many endemics) from species found below it, and the two are recognized as different ecoregions. After the falls disappeared, many species formerly restricted to one of these areas have been able to invade the other, causing problems typically associated with introduced species. For example, more than 30 fish species that formerly were restricted to the region below the falls have been able to invade the region above.

The American composer Philip Glass has written a symphonic cantata named Itaipu in honor of the structure.

The Santa Maria Ecological Corridor now connects the Iguaçu National Park with the protected margins of Lake Itaipu, and via these margins with the Ilha Grande National Park.

== Statistics ==
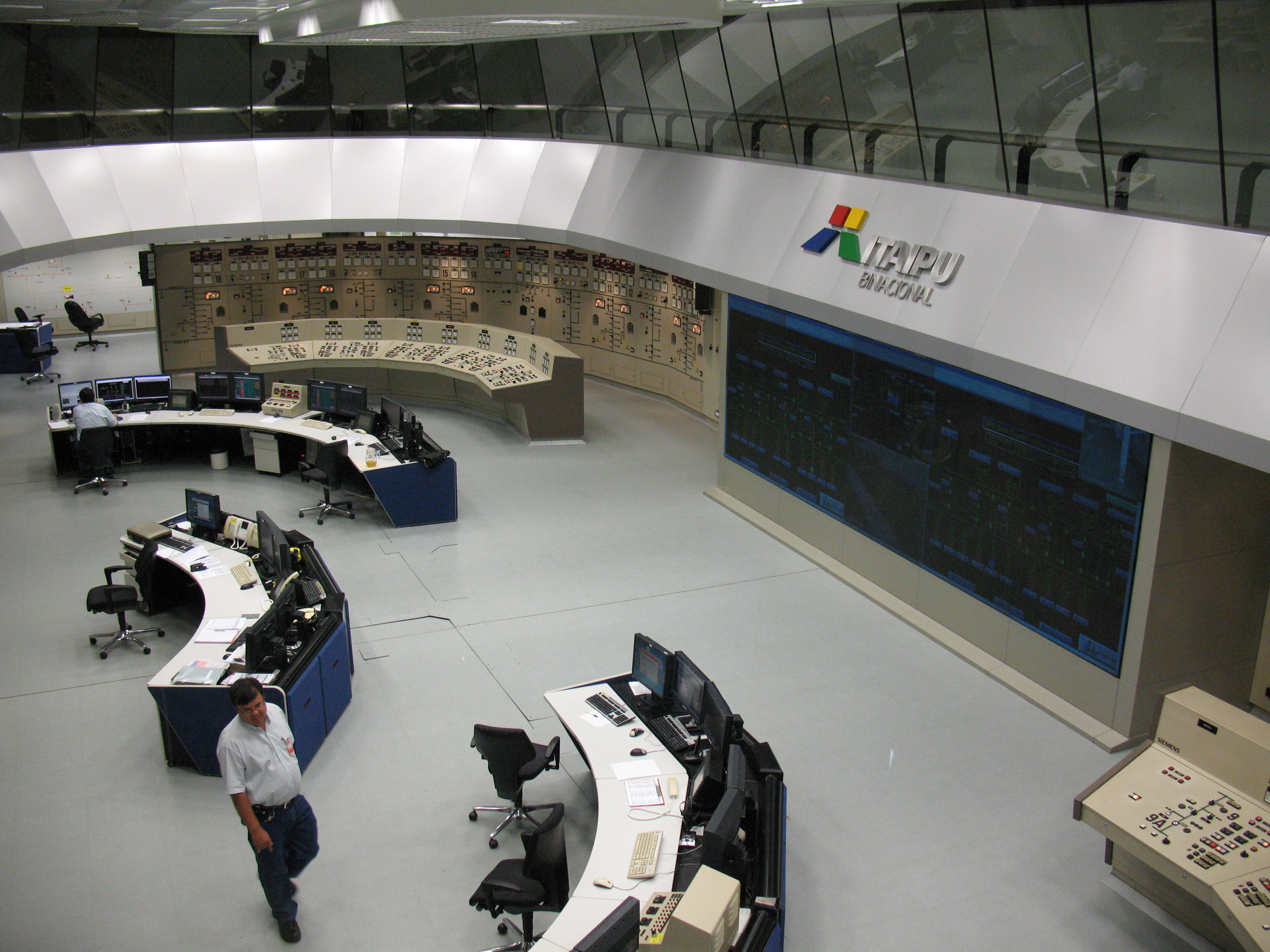
Central Control Room (CCR)

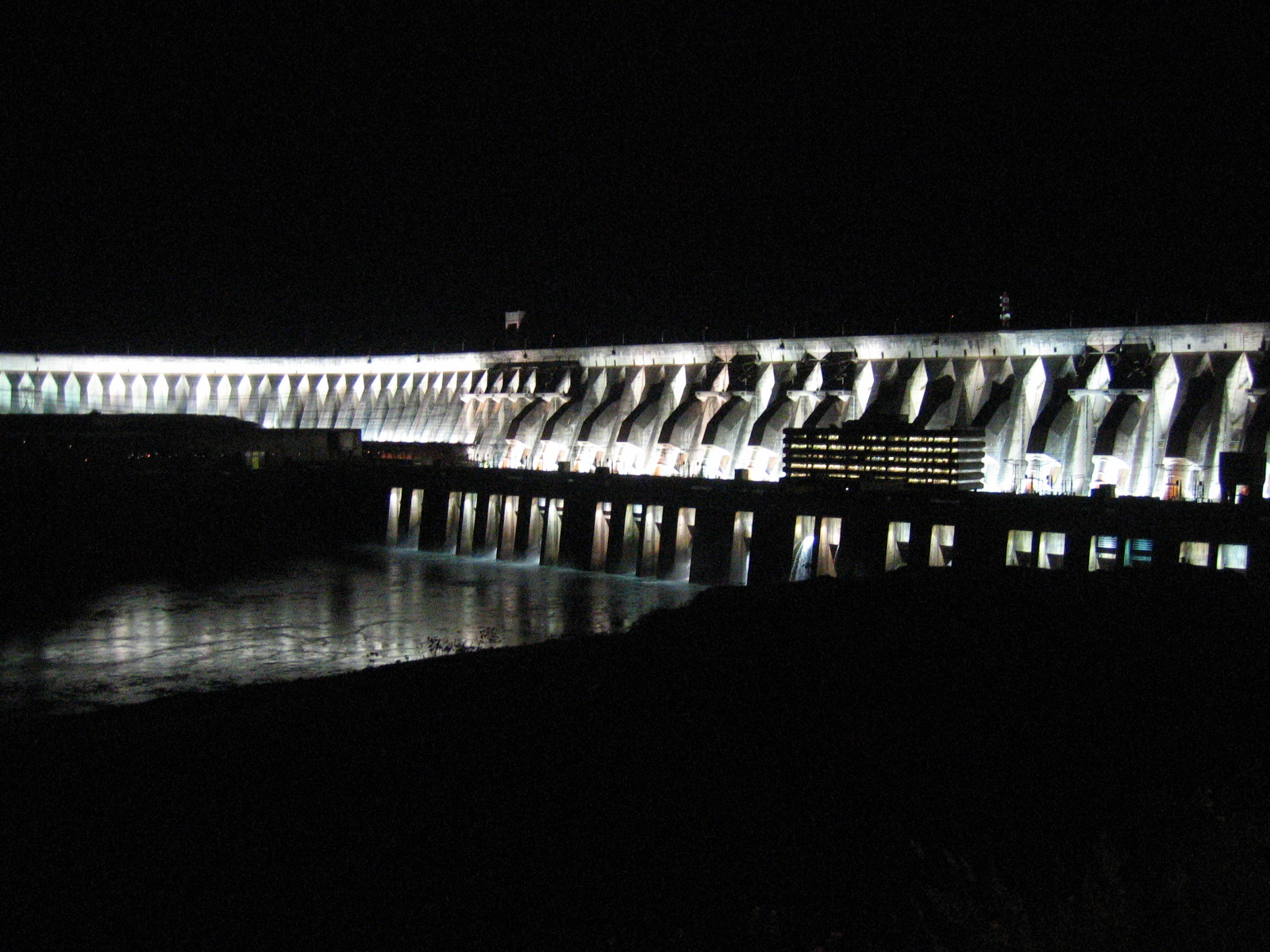
The dam at night

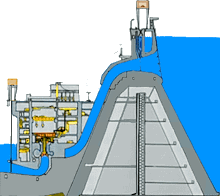
official section of barrage at turbines part

=== Construction ===
- The course of the seventh biggest river in the world was shifted, as were 50 million tonnes of earth and rock.
- The amount of concrete used to build the Itaipu Power Plant would be enough to construct 210 football stadiums the size of the Estádio do Maracanã.
- The iron and steel used would allow for the construction of 380 Eiffel Towers.
- The total volume of excavation of earth and rock in Itaipu is 8.5 times greater than that of the Channel Tunnel, while the volume of concrete is 15 times greater.
- Around forty thousand people worked in the construction.
- Itaipu is one of the most expensive objects ever built.

=== Generating station and dam ===
- The total length of the dam is 7,235 metres (23,737 ft). The crest elevation is 225 metres (738 ft). Itaipu is actually four dams joined together – from the far left, an earth fill dam, a rock fill dam, a concrete buttress main dam, and a concrete wing dam to the right.
- The spillway has a length of 483 metres (1,585 ft).
- The maximum flow of Itaipu's fourteen segmented spillways is 62.2 thousand cubic metres per second (2.20×10^{6} cu ft/s), into three ski slope-formed canals. It is equivalent to 40 times the average flow of the nearby natural Iguaçu Falls.
- The flow of two generators (700 cubic metres per second (25,000 cu ft/s) each) is roughly equivalent to the average flow of the Iguaçu Falls (1,500 cubic metres per second (53,000 cu ft/s)).
- The dam is 196 metres (643 ft) high, equivalent to a 65-story building.
- Though it is the seventh largest reservoir in size in Brazil, the Itaipu's reservoir has the highest ratio of electricity production to flooded area. For the 14,000 MW installed power, 1,350 square kilometres (520 sq mi) were flooded. The reservoirs for the hydroelectric power plants of Sobradinho Dam, Tucuruí Dam, Porto Primavera Dam, Balbina Dam, Serra da Mesa Dam, and Furnas Dam are all larger than the one for Itaipu, but have a smaller installed generating capacity. The one with the next largest hydroelectric production, Tucuruí, has an installed capacity of 8,000 MW, while flooding 2,430 km^{2} (938 sq mi) of land.
- Electricity is 55% cheaper when made by the Itaipu Dam than by the other types of power plants in the area.

=== Generation ===
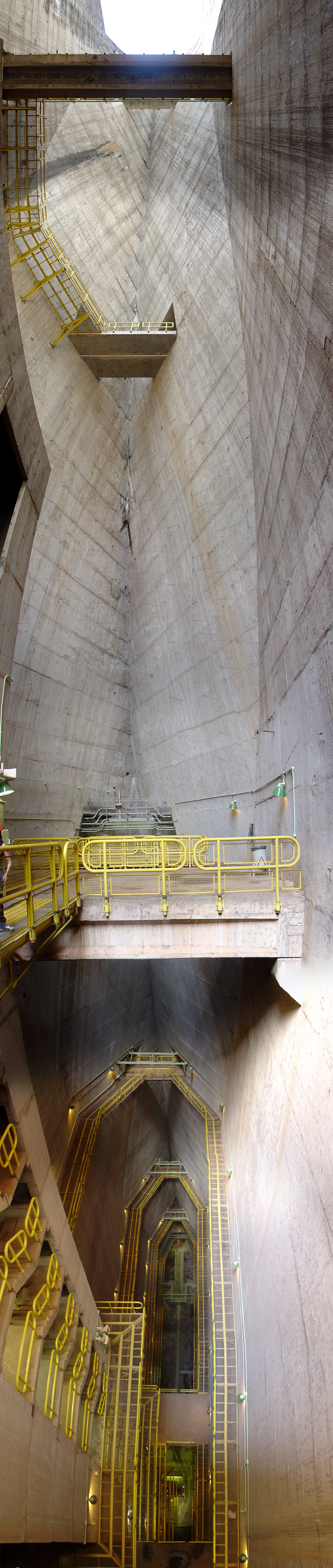
Inside the dam structure

Although its designed peak generating capacity is only 14,000 MW, behind the 22,500 MW Three Gorges Dam, the dam formerly held the record for energy production with 103.1 TWh produced in 2016. This record was beaten in 2020, when the Three Gorges Dam produced a new record 111.8 TWh after extensive monsoon rainfall that year.

In the period 2012–2021, the Itaipu Dam maintained the second-highest average annual hydroelectric production in the world, averaging 89.22 TWh per year, second to the 97.22 TWh per year average of the Three Gorges Dam in that period.

Annual production of energy
Year	Installed units	TWh
1984	0–2	2.770
1985	2–3	6.327
1986	3–6	21.853
1987	6–9	35.807
1988	9–12	38.508
1989	12–15	47.230
1990	15–16	53.090
1991	16–18	57.517
1992	18	52.268
1993	18	59.997
1994	18	69.394
1995	18	77.212
1996	18	81.654
1997	18	89.237
1998	18	87.845
1999	18	90.001
2000	18	93.428
2001	18	79.300
2004	18	89.911
2005	18	87.971
2006	19	92.690
2007	20	90.620
2008	20	94.684
2009	20	91.652
2010	20	85.970
2011	20	92.246
2012	20	98.287
2013	20	98.630
2014	20	87.8
2015	20	89.2
2016	20	103.1
2017	20	96.387
2018	20	96.585
2019	20	79.444
2020	20	76.382
2021	20	66.369
2022	20	69.873
2023	20	83.879

== See also ==
- List of largest dams
- List of largest hydroelectric power stations
- List of largest power stations in the world
- List of conventional hydroelectric power stations
- List of water-related megaprojects
- List of power stations in Brazil
- List of tallest dams
- Megaproject
- Three Gorges Dam
- List of hydroelectric power station failures
