= Santa Terezinha de Itaipu =

Coordinates: 25.4469°S 54.4008°W

- Municipality
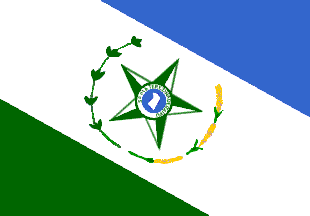
- Flag
- Interactive map of Santa Terezinha de Itaipu
- Country: Brazil
- Region: Southern
- State: Paraná
- Mesoregion: Oeste Paranaense

Population (2020)
  - Total: 23,699
- Time zone: UTC−3 (BRT)

Santa Terezinha de Itaipu is a municipality in the state of Paraná in the Southern Region of Brazil.

According to the IBGE Santa Teresinha de Itaipu has approximately 24,000 inhabitants.

The municipality contains part of the Santa Maria Ecological Corridor, created in 2001.

== See also ==
- List of municipalities in Paraná
