= Santa Helena, Paraná =

Santa Helena
- Municipality
- Flag Coat of arms

- Location in Brazil
- Coordinates: 24°51′36″S 54°19′58″W
- Country: Brazil
- Region: Southern
- State: Paraná
- Mesoregion: Oeste Paranaense

Population (2020)
  - Total: 26,767
- Time zone: UTC -3

Santa Helena is a municipality in the state of Paraná in the Southern Region of Brazil.

== See also ==
- List of municipalities in Paraná
