= Abatiá =

Coordinates: 23°19′S 50°18′W

- Municipality and town
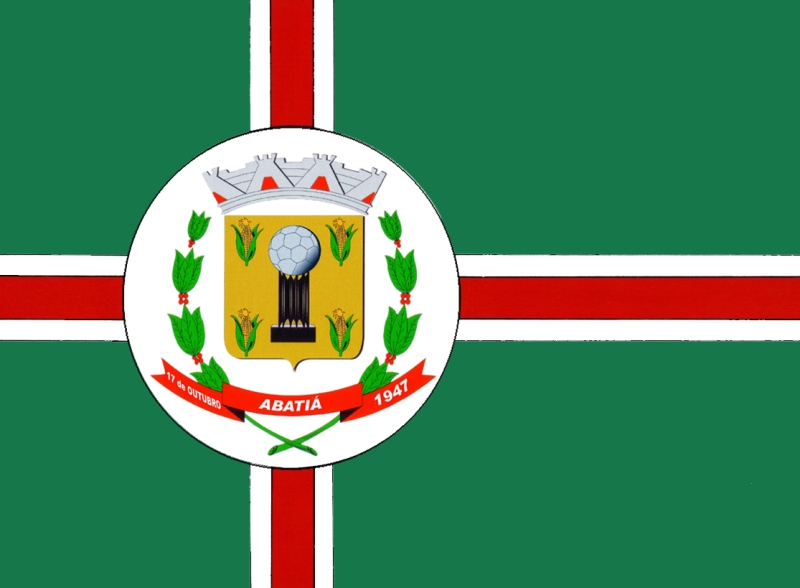
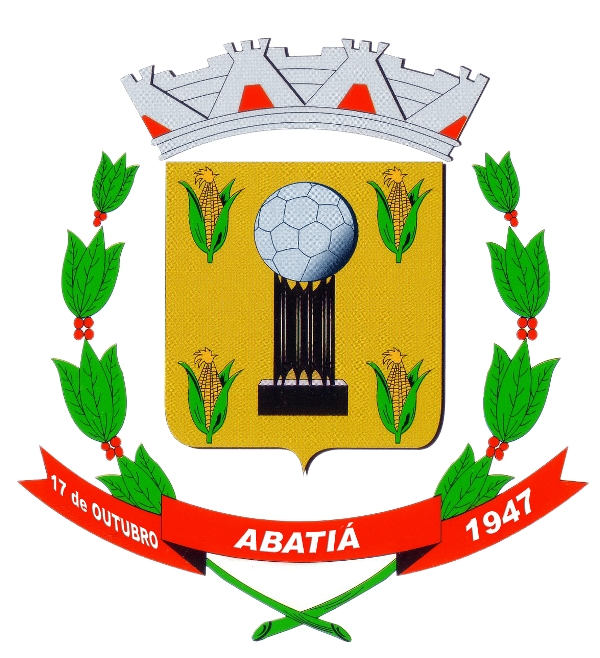
- Flag Coat of arms
- Interactive map of Abatiá
- Country: Brazil
- Region: Southern
- State: Paraná
- Mesoregion: Norte Pioneiro Paranaense

Population (2020)
  - Total: 7,408
- Time zone: UTC−3 (BRT)

Abatiá is a municipality in the state of Paraná in the Southern Region of Brazil.

== See also ==
- List of municipalities in Paraná
