= 2022 Northeastern Brazil floods and mudslides =

Severe meteorological condition caused by the anticyclone of Santa Helena

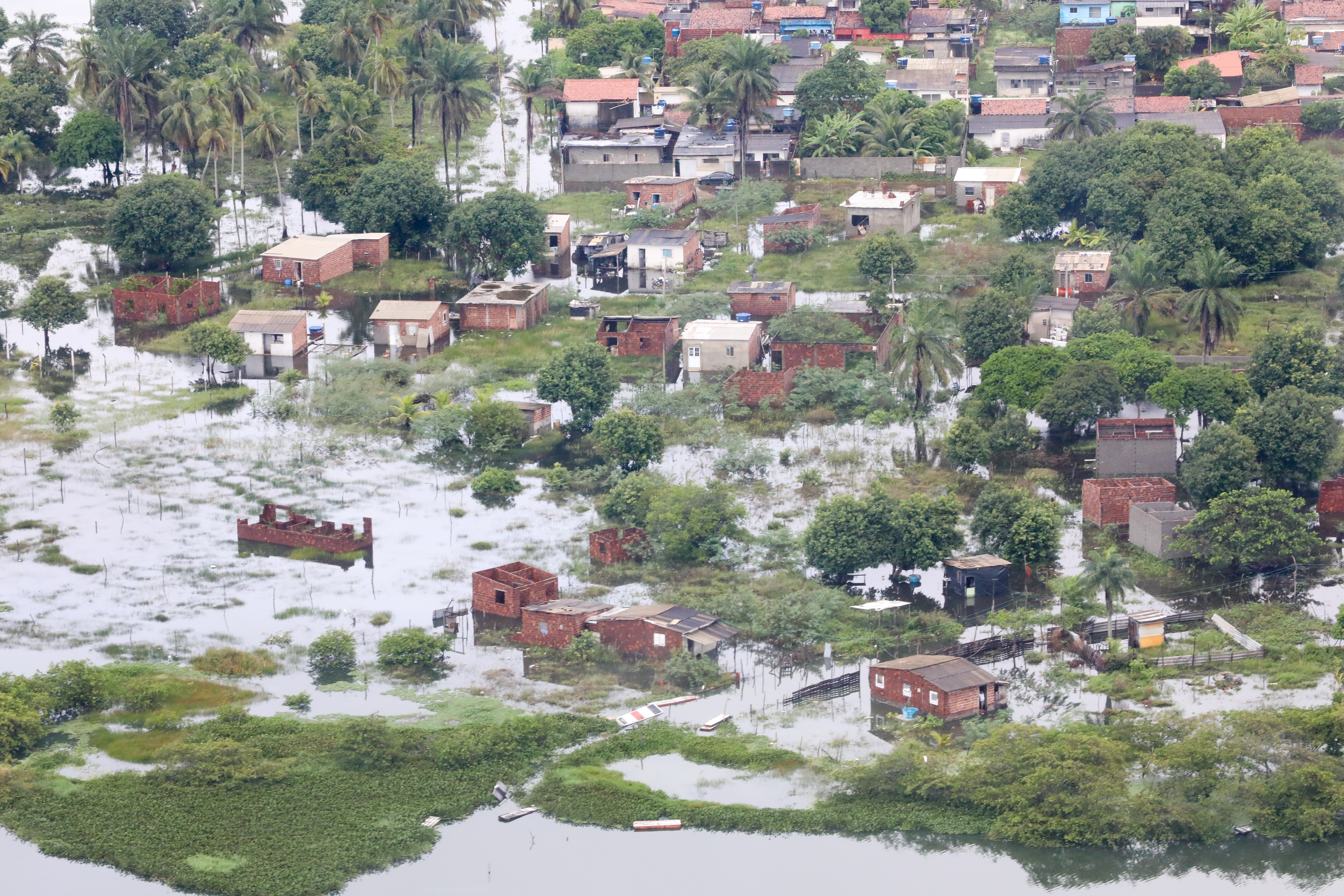
- Houses are destroyed by heavy rains in Recife.
- Date: 23 May – June 2022
- Location: Alagoas, Paraíba, Pernambuco, Rio Grande do Norte and Sergipe
- Cause: South Atlantic High, eastern wave disturbances and higher than expected rainfall
- Deaths: 109

Floods and mudslides occurred in the Northeast Region of Brazil in 2022. Its cause was the rains that hit mainly the state of Pernambuco, but also Sergipe, Alagoas, Paraíba and Rio Grande do Norte. Precipitation volumes surpassed the historical monthly average in several cities in just three days.

== By state ==
=== Pernambuco ===
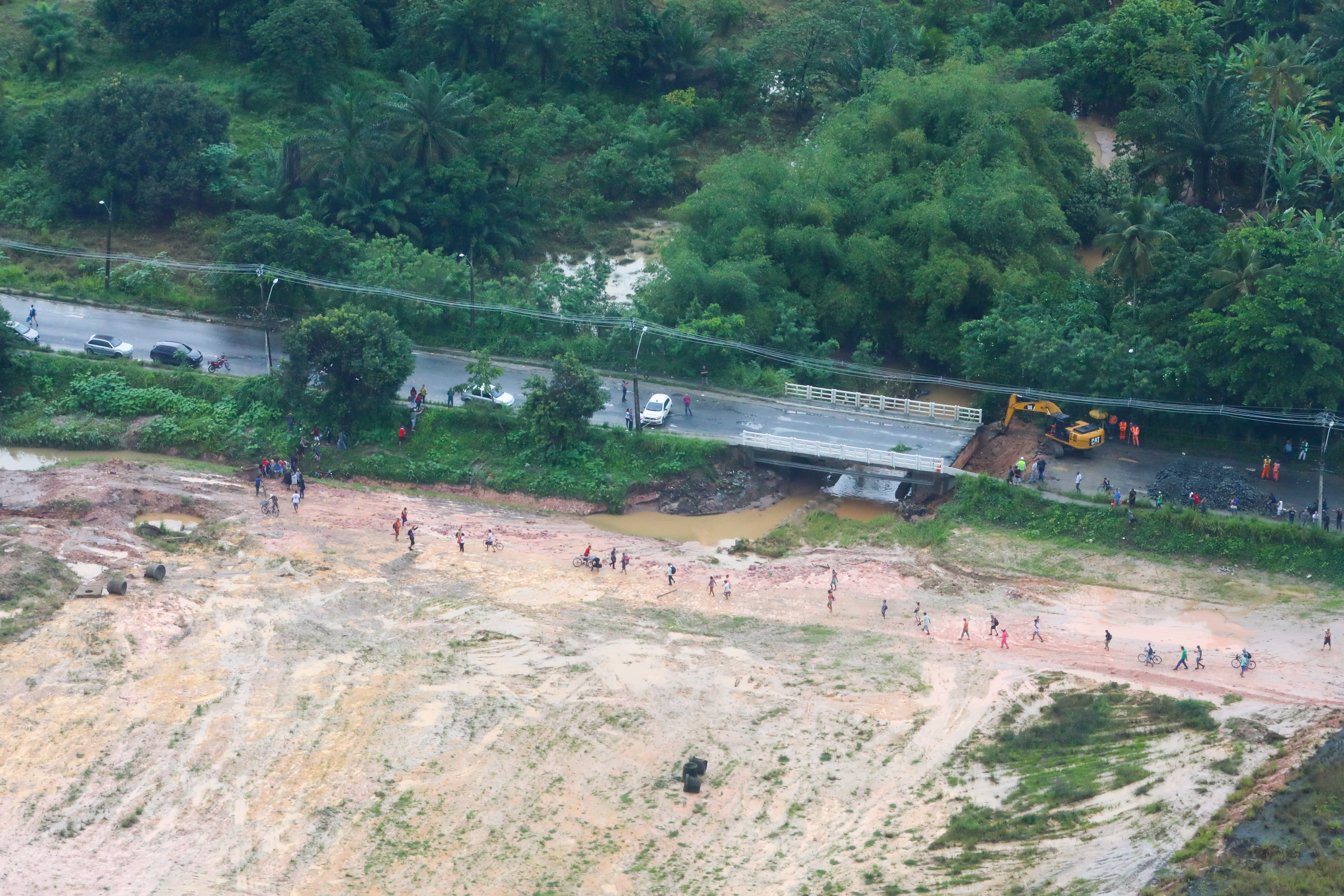
Part of asphalt collapses in highway.

Pernambuco was the most affected state. On 28 and 29 May, the city of Recife was on red alert from the National Institute of Meteorology (Inmet) — which means a high volume of precipitation (more than 60mm per hour or 100mm in a day) and a high possibility of accidents. In 24 hours, the Recife metropolitan area, the Zona da Mata and the Agreste of Pernambuco registered more than 100 millimeters rainfall.

The municipalities of Itapissuma and Itaquitinga recorded more rain, from 6 am on May 27 to 6 am on May 28, than the total forecast for the entire month of May. Recife, Olinda, Jaboatão dos Guararapes, São Lourenço da Mata, Igarassu and Abreu e Lima and at least twelve other municipalities recorded rainfall of more than 200 mm in 24 hours.

The death toll in Greater Recife alone reached 106 and, to date, another 10 people remain missing. In Jardim Monte Verde alone, in the Ibura neighborhood (south of Greater Recife), at least 21 people died. In addition, another 4,000 people were left homeless because of the rains.

=== Alagoas ===
The state was also impacted by heavy rains, with more than 10,000 people rendered homeless. In the capital Maceió, more than 250 mm of rain fell, which exceeded the historical monthly average of the place. At least 33 municipalities in the state were in a state of emergency.

== Government reaction ==
=== State ===
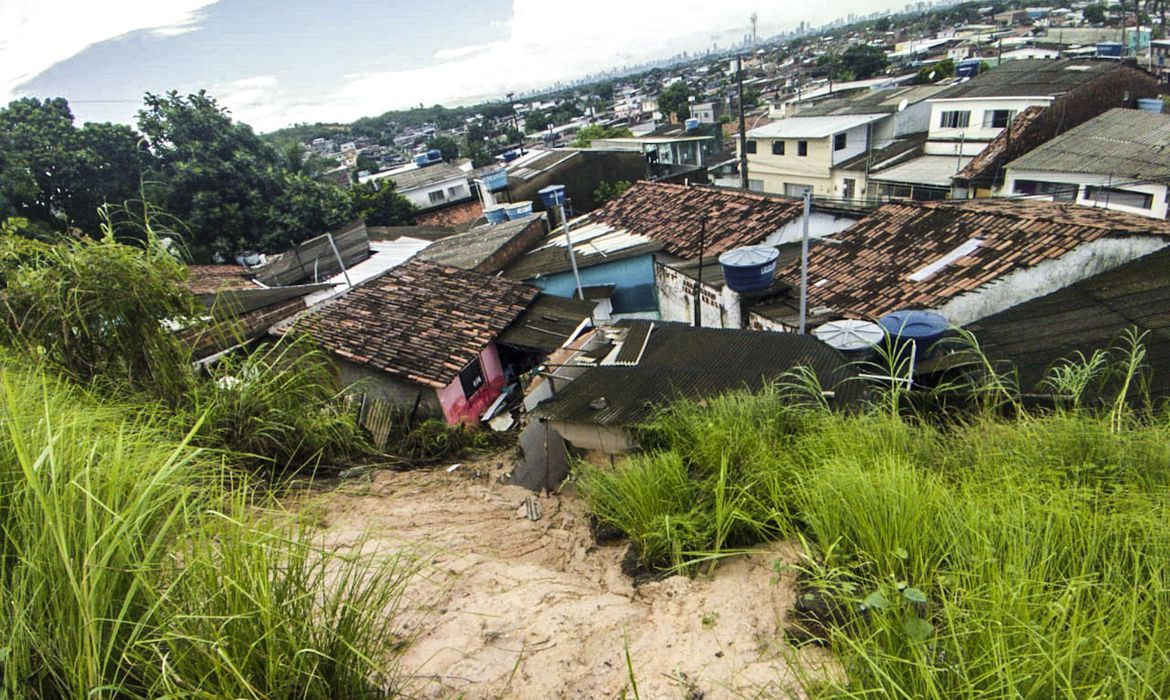
Houses are destroyed after a landslide in Recife.

The governor of Pernambuco, Paulo Câmara, anticipated the appointment of 92 new soldiers from the Pernambuco Military Fire Brigade to reinforce the relief work for the victims of the rains and released 100 million reais for rescue operations. The government declared a situation of emergency, as well as 14 municipalities in the Greater Recife metropolitan region and also requested the support of the Northeastern Military Command for the search and rescue service. The city of Recife has opened schools and day care centers to receive families in need.

=== Federal ===
On the day of the tragedy, President Jair Bolsonaro made 1 billion reais available for emergency aid and for rebuilding houses. On May 30, 2022, the president flew over the scene of the tragedy in a helicopter, but failed to land.

== See also ==
- Late December 2021 Bahia floods
- 2022 Brazil floods and landslides
