= Alberto Maia =

Neighborhood of Camaragibe, Pernambuco, Brazil

- Neighborhood
- Location in Brazil
- Coordinates: 8°01′20″S 35°00′18″W
- Country: Brazil
- State: Pernambuco
- City: Camaragibe

Alberto Maia is a neighborhood of the city of Camaragibe, state of Pernambuco. The neighborhood is located between the allotments of John Paul II, Santa Terezinha, Santa Maria, Santa Mônica and Santana.
