= Helinho =

Helinho may refer to:

- Helinho (footballer, born 1964), Brazilian football winger
- Helinho (footballer, born 1980), Brazilian football midfielder
- Helinho (footballer, born 2000), Brazilian football midfielder/forward
- Helinho (basketball), Brazilian basketball player and coach; head coach of Franca Basquetebol Clube
- Hélio José Muniz Filho (1977–2001), known as Helinho, Brazilian vigilante murderer
- Hélio Justino (born 1972), known as Helinho, Brazilian handball player
