= Recife Metro =

Rapid transit system in Recife

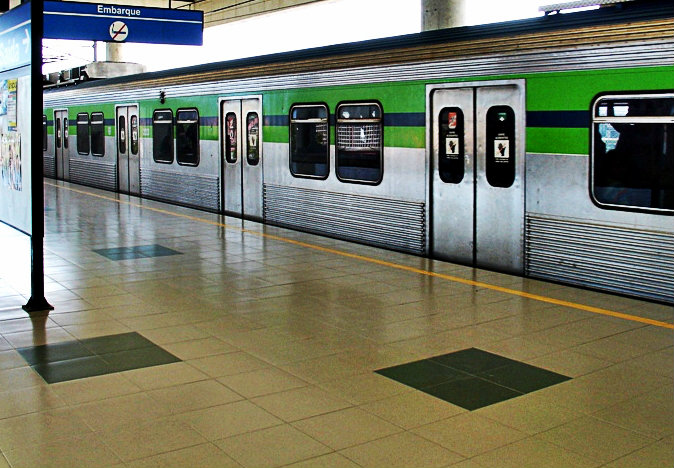

Overview
- Native name: Metrô do Recife, Metrorec
- Locale: Metropolitan Region of Recife, Pernambuco, Brazil
- Transit type: Rapid transit
- Number of lines: 3 (plus 2 light rail lines)
- Line number: C1, C2, S, VLT/Linha Diesel
- Number of stations: 29
- Daily ridership: 225,000 (Metro only)
- Website: CBTU Recife

Operation
- Began operation: 11 March 1985; 41 years ago
- Operator: Companhia Brasileira de Trens Urbanos (CBTU)
- Number of vehicles: 40
- Train length: 4 cars
- Headway: 4.75–7 minutes (Center Line); 16 minutes (South Line)

Technical
- System length: 39.5 km (24.5 mi)
- Track gauge: 1,600 mm (5 ft 3 in)
System map
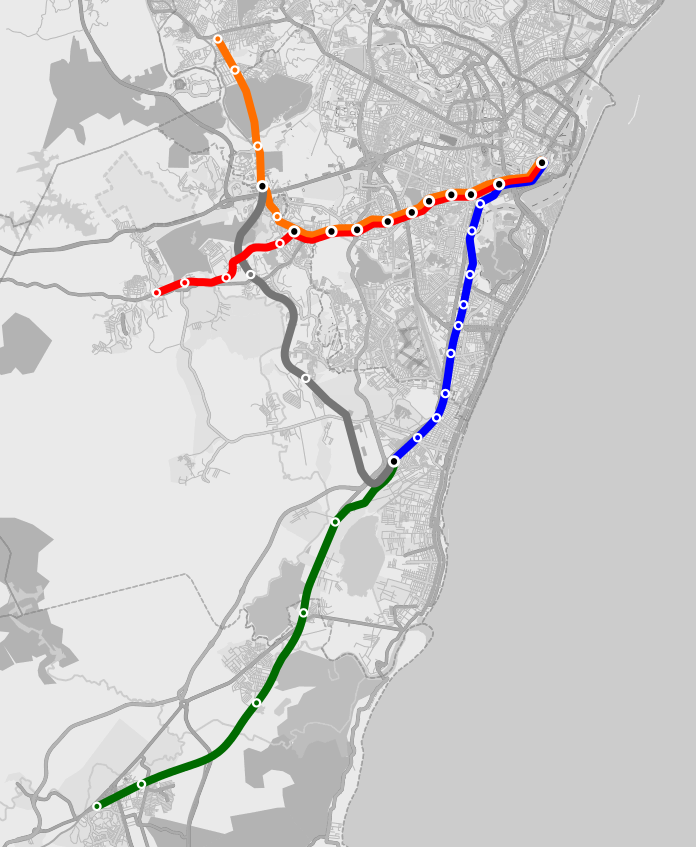
Map of the network, including the light rail line. At the time of the map, Cosme e Damião station was still under construction.

The Recife Metro (Portuguese: Metrô do Recife, Metrorec) is a rapid transit system serving the Metropolitan Region of Recife, Pernambuco, Brazil. It is operated by the federally-owned Companhia Brasileira de Trens Urbanos (CBTU) and currently serves 29 stations, along 39.5 kilometers (24.5 mi) of track. The system is complemented by two diesel-powered light rail lines with seven additional stations. In 2018, the combined system carried 102,089,000 passengers.

== Characteristics ==
The contemporary metro, entirely aboveground, began construction in 1983, with funding from the World Bank. The metro consists of the Center Line (with two branches, Center-1 and Center-2) and the South Line, which all radiate outward from Recife station.

The stations were designed to include various non-written means of identification, as the Northeast Region has a substantial rate of illiteracy (13.9% as of 2019). In addition to audio messages announcing the name of the stop, there are visual cues: a different color is used on the walls of every station, and stations are uniquely identified with pictograms, similar to the Mexico City Metro.

Center Line trains leaving Recife station have one of two destinations: Center-1 trains run to Camaragibe, while Center-2 trains serve Jaboatão dos Guararapes. The two branches run on the same tracks between Recife station and Coqueiral station, reusing the route of an old railway track, where the metro system was built. The South line runs from Recife station parallel to the shore of the Atlantic.

The average distance between stations is of 1.2 kilometers (0.7 mi) so the typical speed of the train is 40 km/h (25 mph), but the maximum speed is 90 km/h (56 mph). The gauge is 1,600 mm (5 ft 3 in) (Irish gauge) and the trains are powered by overhead lines.

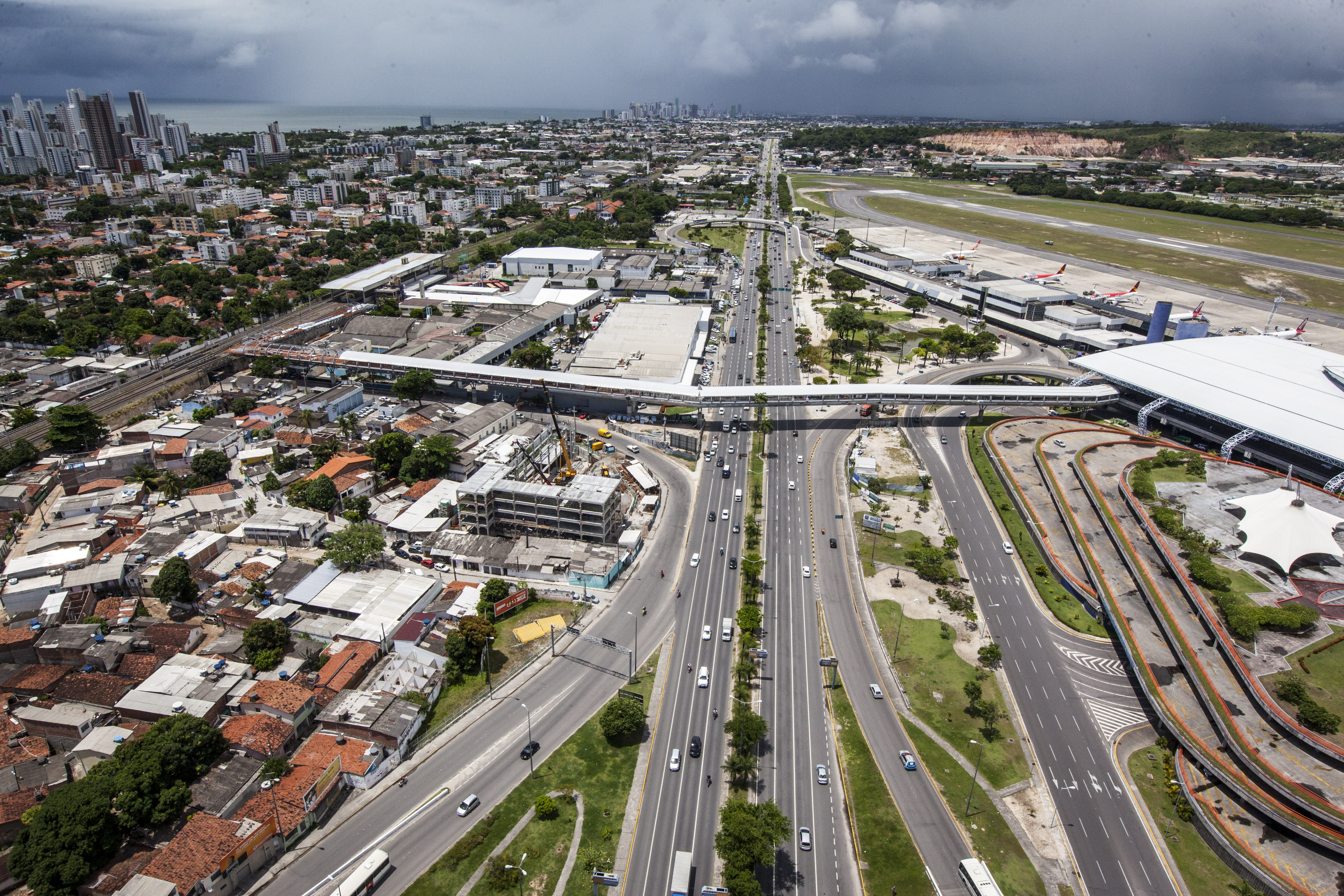
Aerial view of the Recife airport area, where the white walkway directly connecting the terminal to the Recife Metro can be distinguished.

The system originally had a total of 25.2 kilometers (15.7 mi) of route. After completion of the expansion of the network that occurred from February 2005 to March 2009, the metro grew to its current 39.5 kilometers (24.5 mi) in length.

The Recife Metro has a direct connection to the Recife International Airport via the Airport Station, which is located just a few meters from the terminal and accessible by a covered walkway.

=== Diesel light rail ===
A 31.5 km (19.6 mi) long meter gauge (1,000 mm (3 ft 3 3/8 in)) light rail network (Brazilian Portuguese: Veículo Leve sobre Trilhos, VLT) is integrated with the metro system. Two light rail lines link the city of Cabo de Santo Agostinho with Recife and provide a connection between the Center-1 and South lines through the suburbs. The rail lines are not electrified, and use diesel vehicles. Terminology varies, with the CBTU and media referring to it both as the VLT and as the Linha Diesel ('Diesel line'), the name of the former heavy rail service.

=== Bus integration ===
The system also includes several bus lines linked from the terminals of bus/metro integration designated SEI (Sistema Estrutural Integrado - "Integrated Structural System") through which passengers may continue their travel on the same ticket.

== Lines ==
=== Metro ===
The metro is built to a gauge of 1,600 mm (5 ft 3 in), (Irish gauge). All three lines are elevated or at grade, and trains are powered by overhead lines.

Line	Terminals	Start date	Length	Stations	Duration (min)	Schedule (as of April 2021)
Center - 1	Recife ↔ Camaragibe	11 March 1985	†	15	28	Daily, 5 AM to 11 PM
Center - 2	Recife ↔ Jaboatão	29 August 1987	†	14	24	Daily, 5 AM to 11 PM
South	Recife ↔ Cajueiro Seco	28 February 2005	14.3 km	13	25	Daily, 5 AM to 11 PM
Total (metro system)			39.5 km	29	---	---

† Center-1 and Center-2 lines share a significant amount of track. The precise length of each branch has not been published.

=== Light rail ===
Metre gauge (1,000 mm (3 ft 3 3/8 in) is used, in common with most other railways in Brazil. It is built at grade.

Line	Terminals	Start date	Length	Stations	Duration (min)	Schedule (as of April 2021)
Diesel light rail (VLT)	Cabo de Santo Agustinho ↔ Cajueiro Seco, Curado ↔ Cajueiro Seco	2012	31.5 km	8	54	Monday to Friday, 5 AM to 8:44 PM (on Saturdays, until 2pm). No service on Sunday.

== Rolling stock ==
Image	Train model	Type	Years active	Country of origin	Lines served
	ALCO RS-8	Diesel-electric locomotive	1959-present	USA	Light rail
	CAF 100	Electric multiple unit	2012–present	Brazil/Spain	Metro, unknown
	TUDH BS Mobile 3	Diesel multiple unit	1985-unknown	Brazil/Germany	Light rail
	TUE Santa Matilde/MAN Série 800	Electric multiple unit	2012-present	Brazil/Germany/UK	Metro, unknown

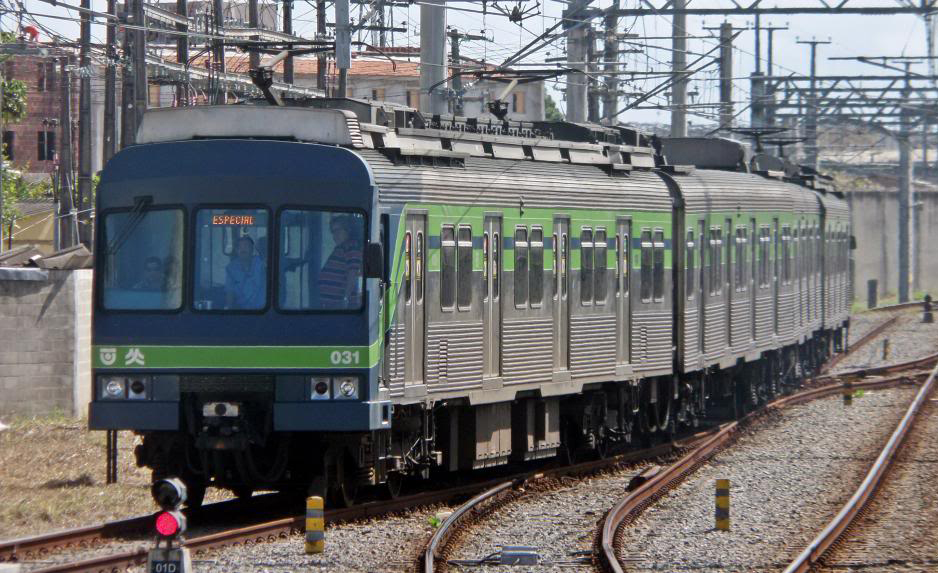
TUE Série 800

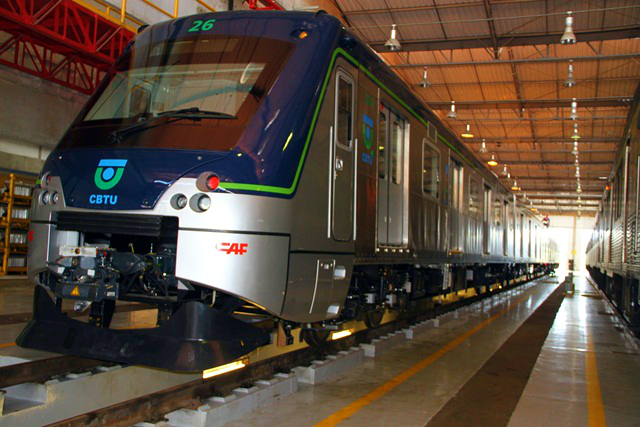
CAF 100

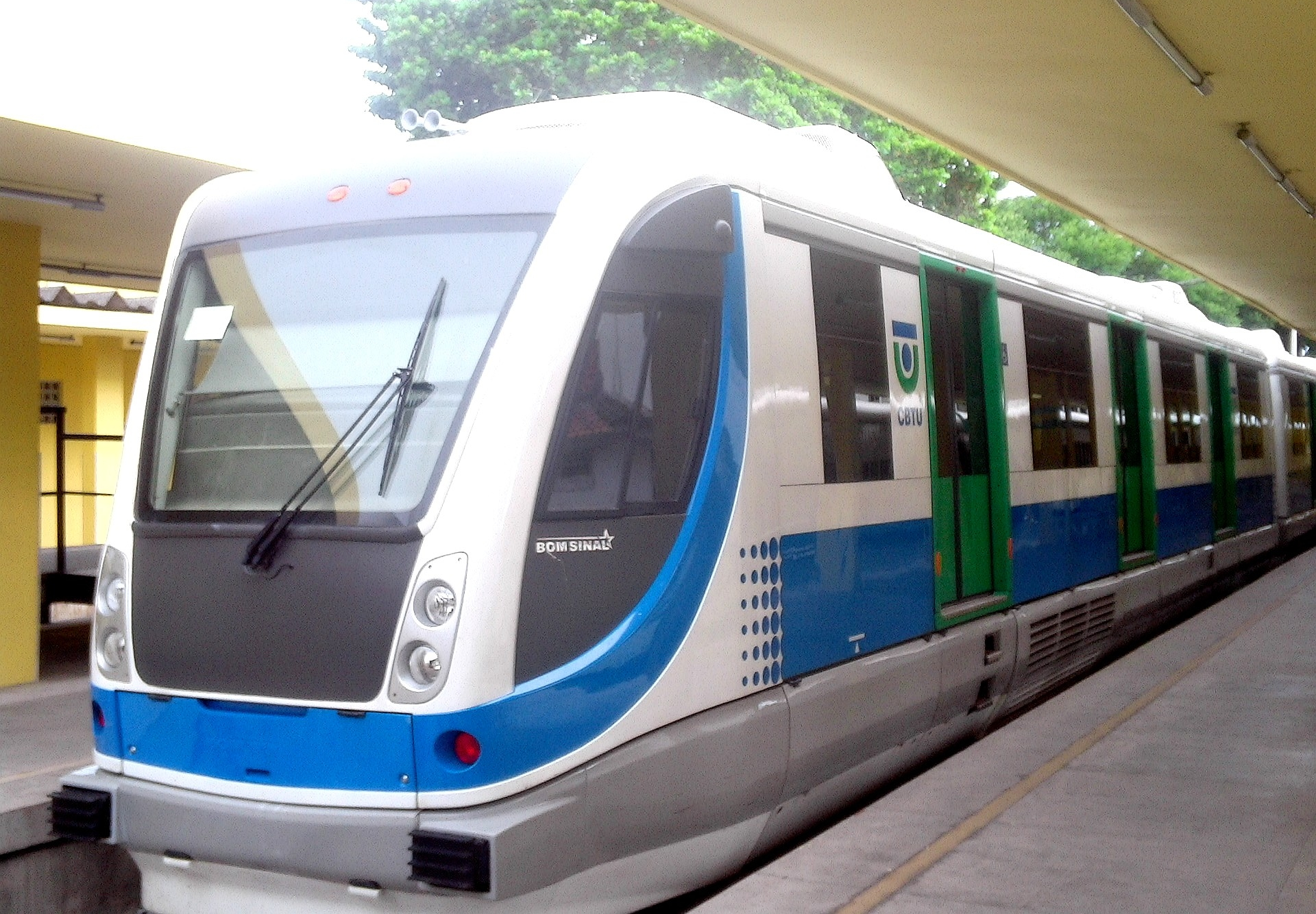
TUDH BS Mobile 3, on a different system in Maceio

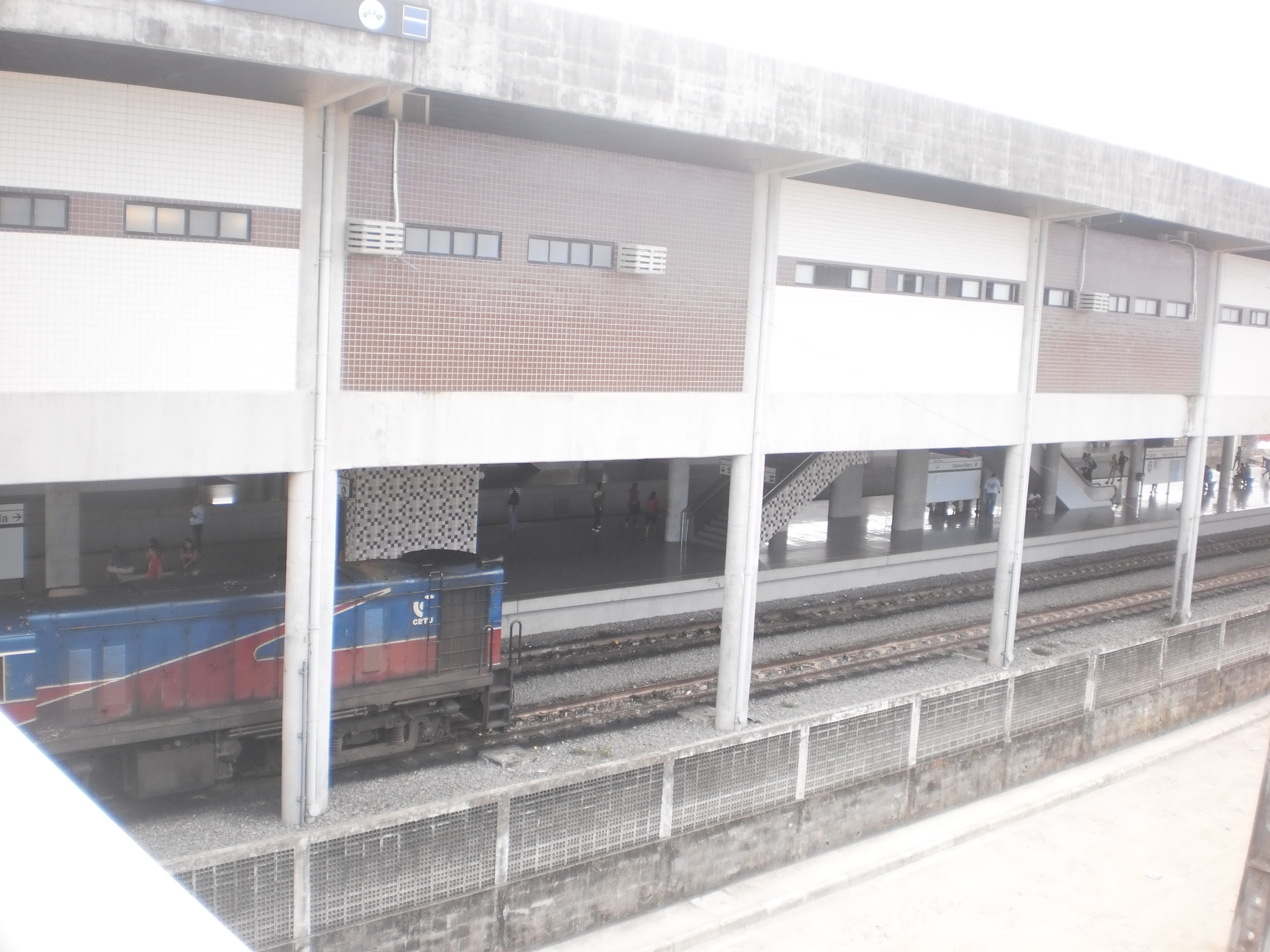
Locomotive at Cajueiro Seco station, in 2011

== Stations ==
Nº	Center-1	Center-2	South Line	Diesel Light Rail
1	Recife SEI	Recife SEI	Recife SEI	Curado C1
2	Joana Bezerra¹ SEI	Joana Bezerra¹ SEI	Joana Bezerra¹ SEI	Jorge Lins
3	Afogados SEI	Afogados SEI	Largo da Paz SEI	Marcos Freire
4	Ipiranga	Ipiranga	Imbiribeira	Cajueiro Seco SEI, S
5	Mangueira	Mangueira	Antonio Falcão	Ângelo de Souza
6	Santa Luzia SEI	Santa Luzia SEI	Shopping Center Recife	Pontezinha
7	Edgar Werneck	Edgar Werneck	Tancredo Neves SEI	Ponte dos Carvalhos
8	Barro SEI	Barro SEI	Aeroporto - Airport SEI	Santo Inácio
9	Tejipió	Tejipió	Porta Larga	Cabo SEI
10	Coqueiral²	Coqueiral²	Monte dos Guararapes	
11	Alto do Céu	Cavaleiro SEI	Prazeres SEI	
12	Curado LRT	Floriano	Cajueiro Seco SEI, LRT	
13	Rodoviária-Coach station	Engenho Velho		
14	Cosme e Damião	Jaboatão		
15	Camaragibe SEI			

=== Notes ===
- SEI: integration with local buses
- 1: Center-1, Center-2 and South lines run together between Recife and Joana Bezerra stations
- 2: Center-1 and Center-2 run together between Recife and Coqueiral stations
Examples of station pictograms

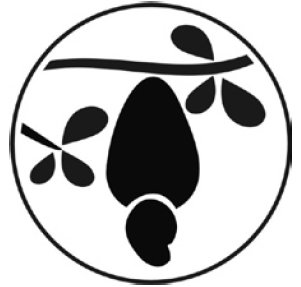
Pictogram for Cajueiro Seco (lit. 'dry cashew') station, depicting a cashew apple

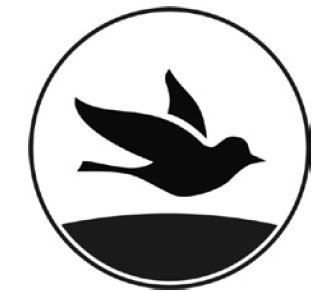
Pictogram for Largo da Paz (lit. 'Peace Square') station, depicting a dove

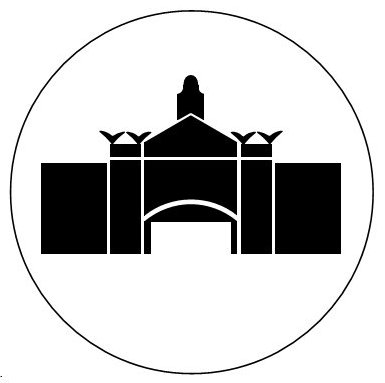
Pictogram for Recife station, depicting the former central railway station

== Network map (excluding light rail) ==
Map

== See also ==
- List of metro systems
- Rapid transit in Brazil
