= Lupércio do Nascimento =

Professor Lupércio
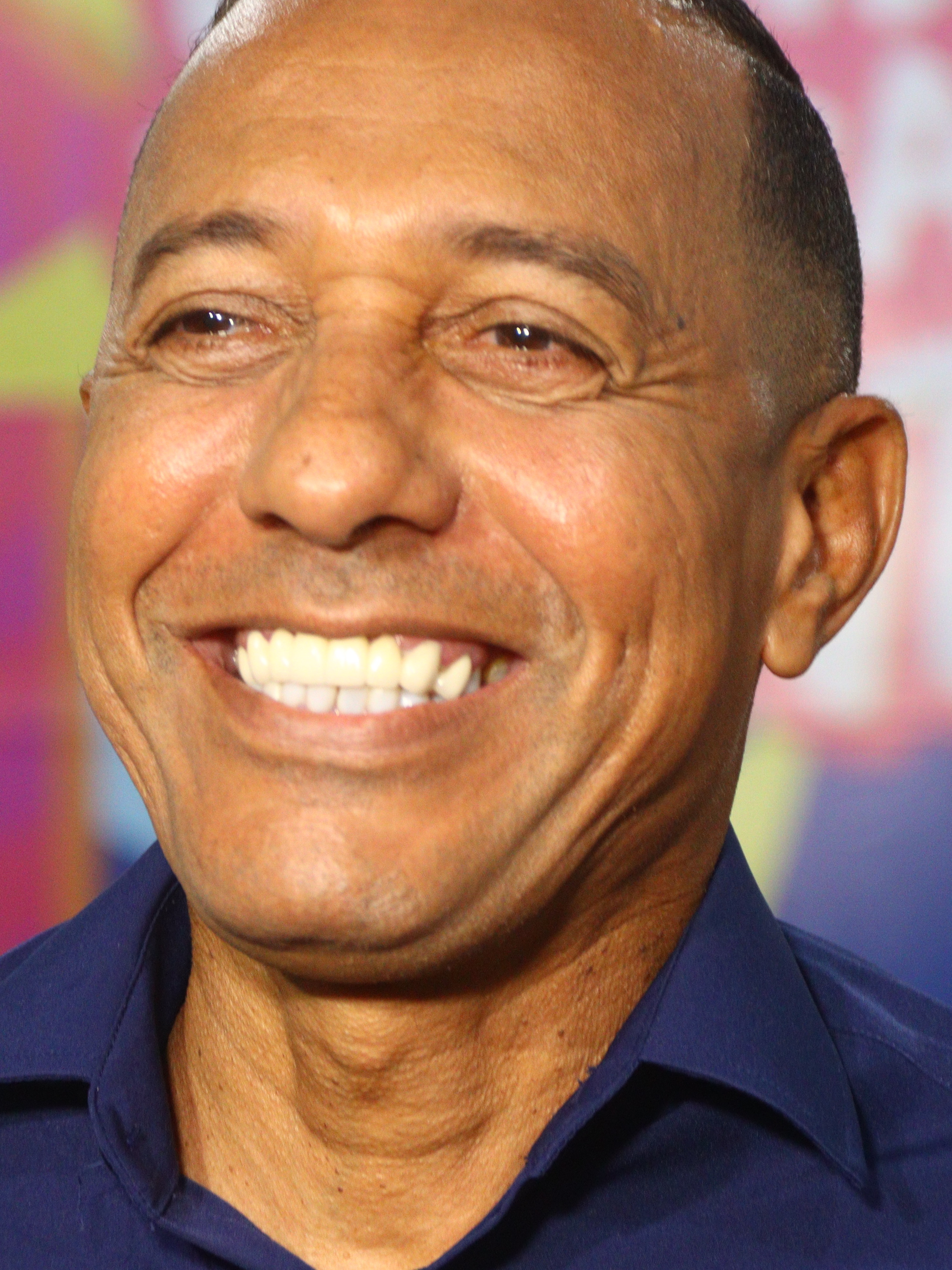
- Professor Lupércio in 2024.

Mayor of Olinda
- In office 1 January 2017 – 1 January 2025
- Preceded by: Renildo Calheiros
- Succeeded by: Mirella Almeida

State Deputy of Pernambuco
- In office 1 February 2015 – 1 January 2017

Councilman of Olinda
- In office 1 January 2005 – 1 January 2009
- In office 1 January 2013 – 1 February 2015

Personal details
- Born: Lupércio Carlos do Nascimento; 15 November 1967 (age 58) Recife, Pernambuco, Brazil
- Party: PSD (2023–present)
- Other political affiliations: See list: PTN (2003–2007); PDT (2007–2009); DEM (2009–2011); PV (2011–2013); SD (2013–2023)
- Education: Faculdade de Olinda

Lupércio Carlos do Nascimento (born 15 November 1967), better known as Professor Lupércio, is a Brazilian politician currently affiliated with the Social Democratic Party (PSD). He was the mayor of the city of Olinda from 2017 to 2025.

== Career ==
Lupércio entered politics through the student movements, coming to become president of the Central Student's Directory of the FUNESO (Fundação de Ensino Superior de Olinda), the institution in which he graduated with a degree in mathematics. Along with this, he earned his bachelor's degree in law from Faculdade de Olinda and has a post-graduate degree in mathematics.

He ran to become a city councilor in Olinda three times: in 2004 for the PTN, where he was elected; in 2008, for the PDT, losing reelection; and in 2012 for the PV, becoming the most voted for city councilor in the history of the city. In 2014, he was elected as a state deputy in the state of Pernambuco for Solidariedade. In 2016, he was elected to become mayor of Olinda for Solidariedade, defeating Antônio Campos of the Brazilian Socialisty Party (PSB). He was reelected in 2020, defeating João Paulo Lima e Silva, of the Communist Party of Brazil (PCdoB).

During the 2024 elections, he supported his former secretary of Economic Development, Mirella Almeida of the PSD, to succeed him as mayor. She was elected with 51.38% of the vote in the second round in a tight race against opposition candidate Vinícius Castello of the PT.

At the end of 2024, on taking stock of his administration, he affirmed his intention to run again for the state legislature in 2026.
