= Moreno, Pernambuco =

City in Pernambuco, Brazil

Moreno
- Municipality of Pernambuco, Brazil
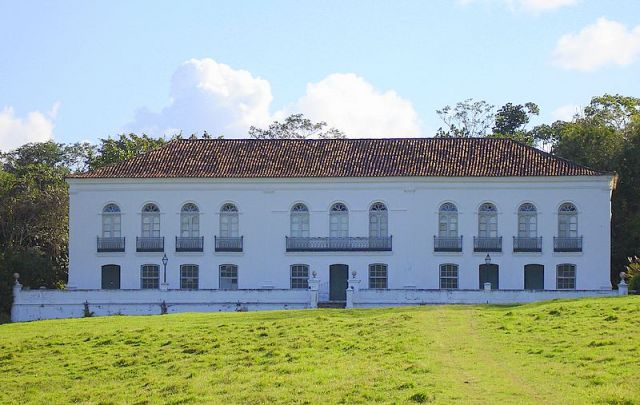
- Moreno Mill in Moreno

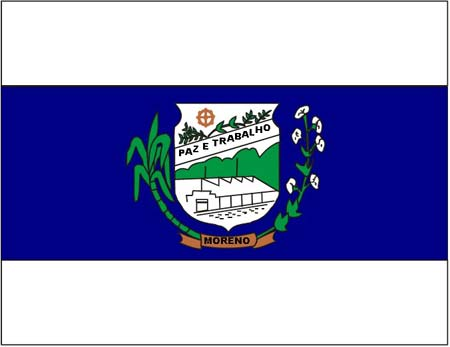
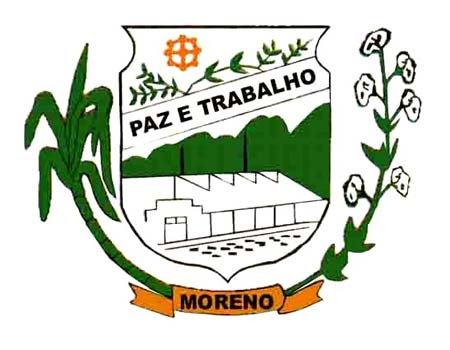
- Flag Coat of arms

- Location of Moreno in Pernambuco

- Location within Brazil Location within South America
- Coordinates: 8°7′7″S 35°5′32″W
- Country: Brazil
- Region: Northeast
- State: Pernambuco
- Founded: 11 September 1928

Government
  - Mayor: Edmilson Cupertino de Almeida (PP) (2025-2028)
  - Vice Mayor: José Jerônimo Santana Barbosa (Republicanos) (2025-2028)

Area
  - Total: 194.197 km^{2} (74.980 sq mi)
- Elevation: 96 m (315 ft)

Population (2022 Census)
  - Total: 55,292
  - Estimate (2025): 57,654
  - Density: 284.72/km^{2} (737.4/sq mi)
- Demonym: Morenense (Brazilian Portuguese)
- Time zone: UTC-03:00 (Brasília Time)
- Postal code: 54800-000
- HDI (2010): 0.652 – medium
- Website: moreno.pe.gov.br

Moreno (Recifense portuguese pronunciation: [mɔˈɾẽnŭ]) is a city in the state of Pernambuco, Brazil. It's integrated in the Recife metropolitan area with another 13 cities. Moreno has a total area of 195.6 square kilometers and had an estimated population of 63,294 inhabitants in 2020 according with IBGE.

== Geography ==
- State - Pernambuco
- Region - RMR (Recife)
- Boundaries - São Lourenço da Mata (N), Cabo de Santo Agostinho (S), Jaboatão (W), Vitória de Santo Antão (E)
- Area - 195.6 km^{2}
- Elevation - 96 m (312 ft)
- Hydrography - Capibaribe River
- Vegetation - Atlantic forest, capoeira, capoeirinha and sugarcane plantation
- Climate - Hot tropical and dry
- Annual average temperature - 26 C
- Main road - BR 232 and PE 007
- Distance to Recife - 30 km

== Economy ==
The main economic activities in Moreno are based in food industry, commerce and primary sector especially eggs, chickens and honey.

=== Economic Indicators ===
Population	GDP x(1000 R$).	GDP pc (R$)	PE	RMR
55.659	207.508	3.928	0.35%	0.54%

Economy by Sector 2006

Primary sector	Secondary sector	Service sector
17.76%	14.42%	67.82%

=== Health Indicators ===
HDI (2000)	Hospitals (2007)	Hospitals beds (2007)	Children's Mortality every 1000 (2005)
0.693	2	123	20.4

== See also ==
- List of municipalities in Pernambuco
