= Jaboatão dos Guararapes =

Municipality of Pernambuco, Brazil

- Municipality
- Municipality of Jaboatão dos Guararapes
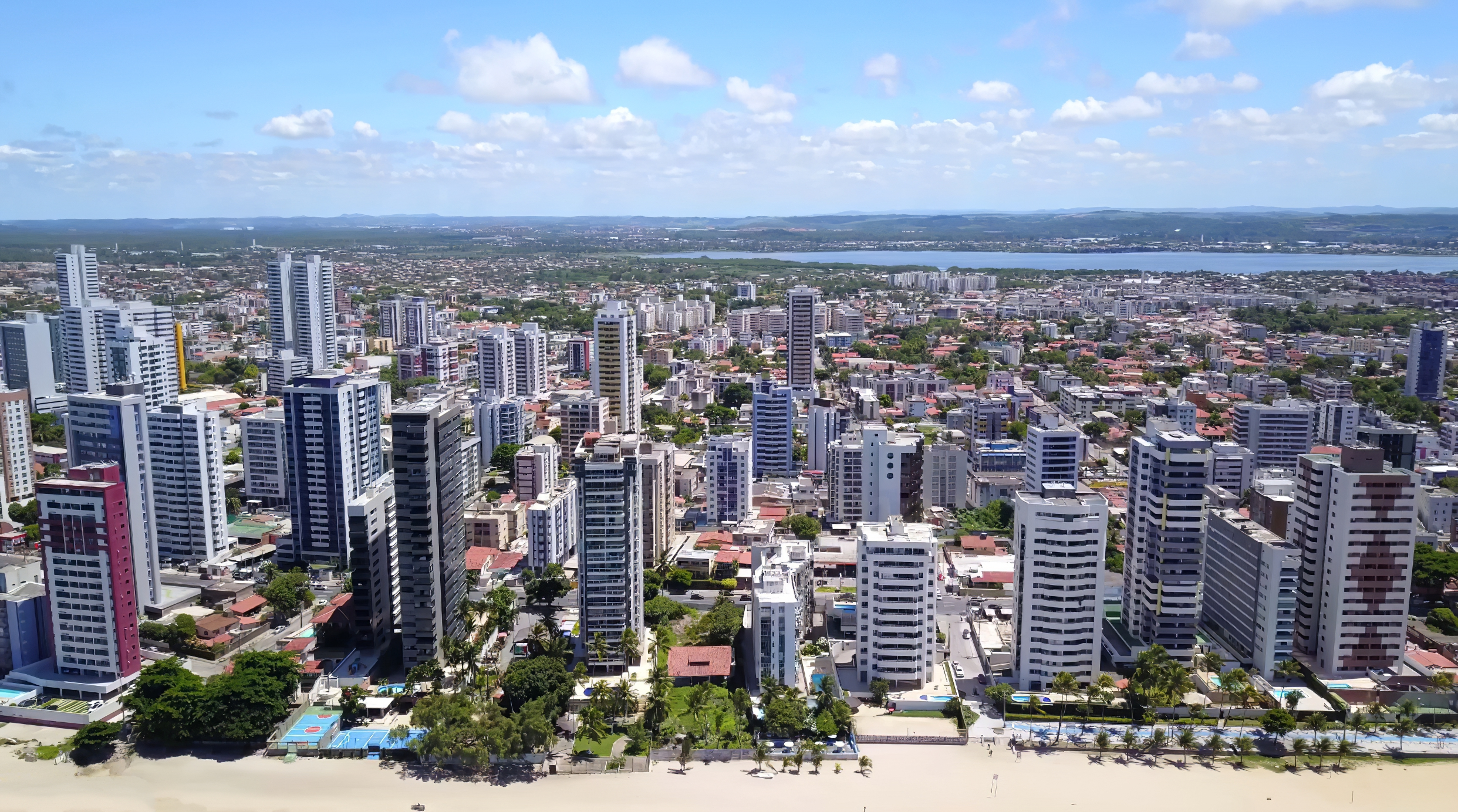
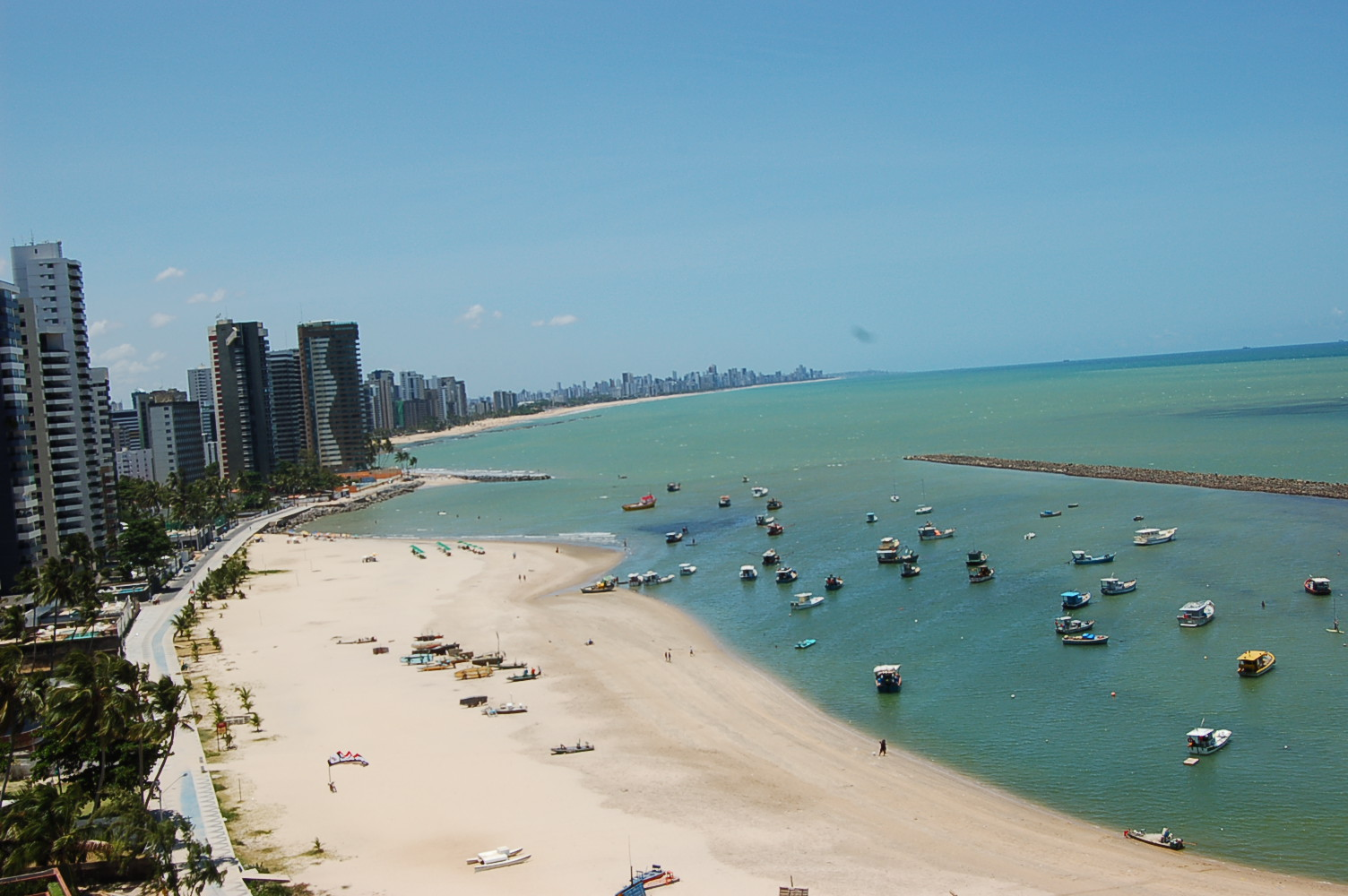
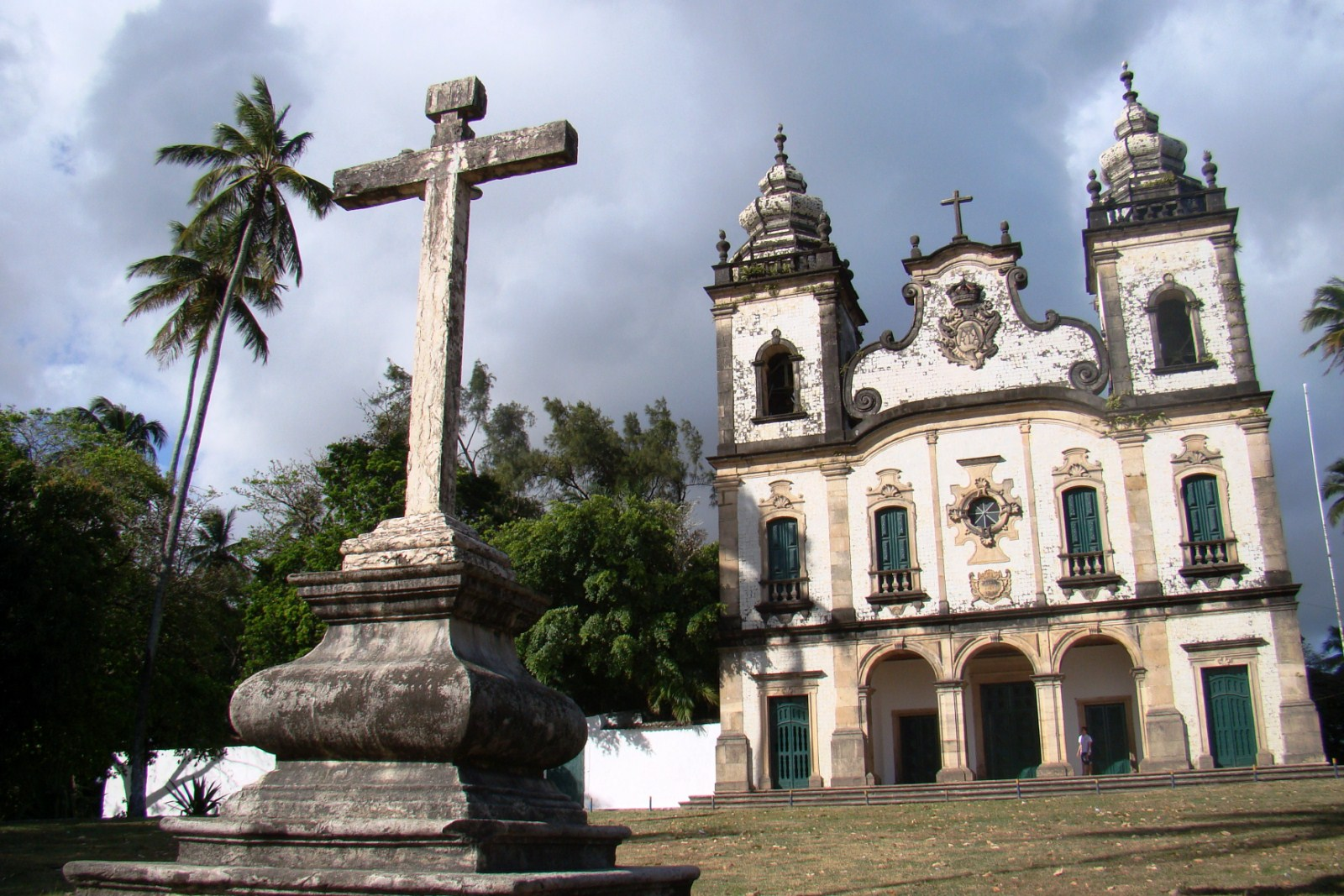
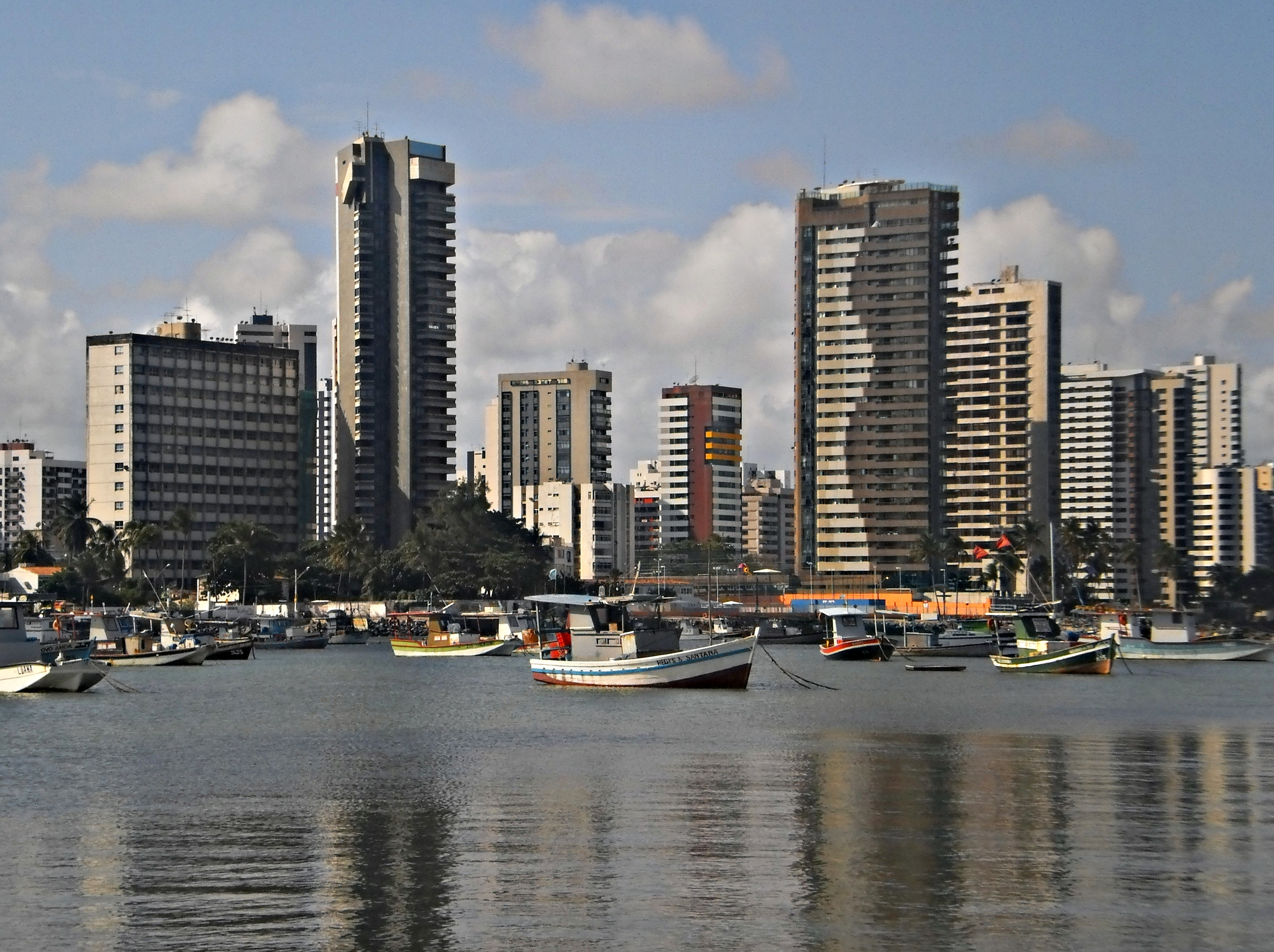
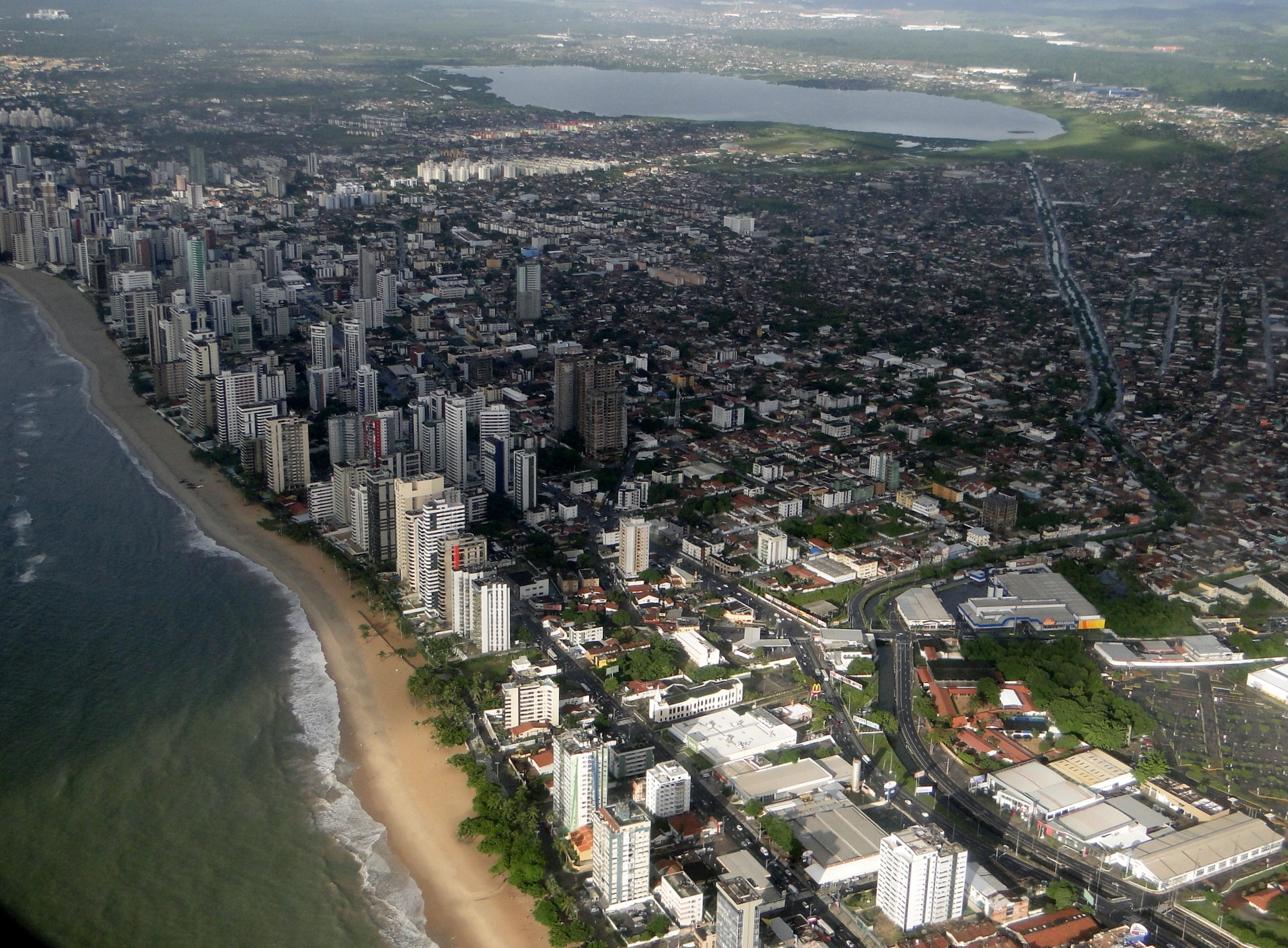
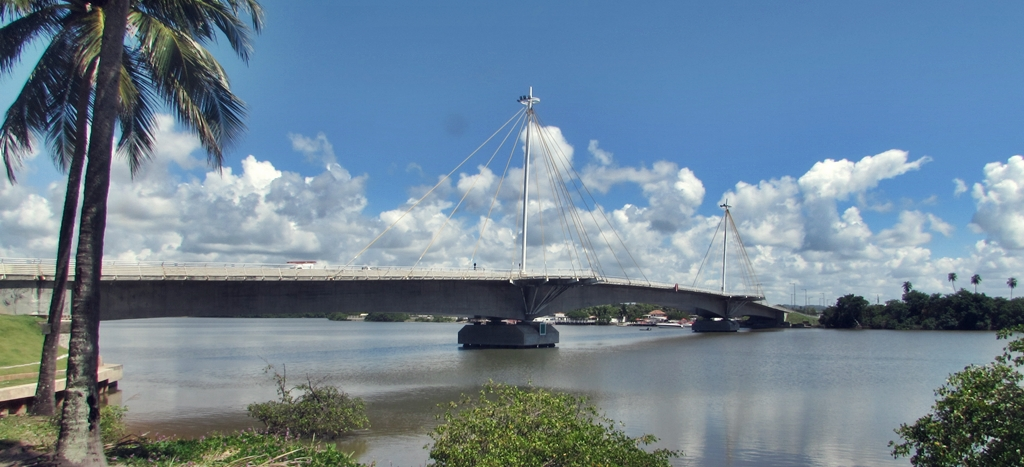

- Flag Coat of arms
- Nickname: "Nation's Birthplace"
- Motto: "For Nation's Unity"
- Location in Pernambuco
- Coordinates: 8°06′44″S 35°00′56″W
- Country: Brazil
- Region: Northeast
- State: Pernambuco

Government
  - Mayor: Luiz José Inojosa de Medeiros (Mano medeiros) (PR)

Area
  - Total: 256.08 km^{2} (98.87 sq mi)
- Elevation: 10 m (33 ft)

Population (2022 Census)
  - Total: 644,037
  - Estimate (2025): 684,293
  - Density: 2.489/km^{2} (6.45/sq mi)
- Time zone: UTC−3 (BRT Brasília Time)
  - Summer (DST): Since 2019, Brazil no longer observes daylight saving time.
- Postal Code: 54000-000
- Area code: +55 81
- HDI (2010): 0.717 – high
- Website: jaboatao.pe.gov.br

Jaboatão dos Guararapes (Portuguese pronunciation: [ʒabwaˈtɐ̃w duz ɡwaɾaˈɾapis]) is a city in the state of Pernambuco, Brazil. It is a part of the Recife metro area. The population was 706,867 according to the Brazilian Institute of Geography and Statistics (IBGE) in 2020, making it the second most-populous city in the state of Pernambuco and the 27th in Brazil, ahead of major Brazilian state capitals such as Cuiabá and Aracaju. The city is a very important industrial center, hosting companies like Unilever and Coca-Cola. It is bordered by Recife in the north, Cabo de Santo Agostinho on the south, and Mangue forests to the west in Moreno.

== Geography ==
The city is located at around 8°6′46″S 35°0′54″W, just south of Recife. It has three urban beaches (Piedade, Candeias and Barra de Jangada). Some of the main neighborhoods are Candeias, Cavaleiro, Piedade, Jardim Piedade and Barra de Jangada.

- State – Pernambuco
- Region – RMR (Recife)
- Boundaries – Sao Lourenco da Mata and Recife (N), Cabo de Santo Agostinho (S ), Moreno (W), Atlantic Ocean (E)
- Area – 256.073 km^{2} (99 sq mi)
- Elevation – 76 m (247 ft)
- Hydrography – small coaster rivers
- Rivers – Jaboatão, Gurjaú and Jordão
- Urban Beaches – Piedade, Candeias and Barra de Jangada
- Vegetation – Atlantic forest, Mangal and Sugarcane
- Climate – Hot tropical and humid
- Annual average temperature – 28 c
- Metro – Recife Metro
- Main roads – BR 101, BR 232, BR-408, PE-007, PE-008 (Batalha's Road) and PE-017 (Axis of Integration)
- Main ways – Bernado Vieira de Melo Avenue, Beira-Mar (Seaside) Avenue, Curcurana's Road, Manoel Rabelo's Avenue, Castelo Branco's Avenue, Barreto de Menezes Avenue, Ayrton Senna's Avenue, Setúbal Channel Avenue, President Kennedy's Avenue, Aniceto Varejão Street and Arão Lins de Andrade Street

== History ==
The unclassified extinct Arapoá language was spoken around Jaboatão.

The city of Jaboatão dos Guararapes was founded on 4 May 1593 by Bento Luiz Figueira, the third owner of Engenho São João Baptista. The Second Battle of Guararapes occurred in the city and was one of the most important battles in Brazil's history, in which the people from Pernambuco defeated and expelled the Dutch from the State. This battle was an important event that led to the creation of the Brazilian Army. In 1873 it ascended to village status, and in 1884 after being split up with Olinda it ascended to city status.

== Demographics ==
In 2009, the city population estimated by IBGE was 687,688, however, local politicians criticized the research claiming that there were more people living in the city than were on the census. Notwithstanding, IBGE did not redo the survey. Its population makes it the 2nd most populous city in the state of Pernambuco, 9th in the Northeast region and the 26th in the whole country.

== Economy ==
The main economic activities in Jaboatao dos Guararapes are based in tourism, commerce, beverage industry and transportation industry.

=== Economic indicators ===
Population	GDP x(1000 R$).	GDP pc (R$)	PE (%)	RMR (%)
687.688	5,578,363	8.384	9.00	13.91

Economy by sector 2006
Primary sector	Secondary sector	Service sector
0.45%	26.39%	73.16%

=== Health indicators ===
HDI (2000)	Hospitals (2007)	Hospitals beds (2007)	Children's Mortality every 1000 (2005)
0.777	4	576	17.1

== See also ==
- List of municipalities in Pernambuco
- Pernambuco museums
- Pernambuco beaches
- Associação Desportiva Jaboatão dos Guararapes
