= Camaragibe =

City in Pernambuco, Brazil

- Municipality
- Municipality of Camaragibe; Município de Camaragibe
- Flag Coat of arms
- Motto: Fé e Esperança "Faith and Hope"
- Location in the state of Pernambuco and Brazil

- Location in Brazil Camaragibe (South America)
- Coordinates: 8°01′19″S 34°58′51″W
- Country: Brazil
- Region: Northeast
- State: Pernambuco
- Emancipated: 13 March 1982 (44 years ago)
- Named for: Lantana camara (plant)

Government
  - Type: Mayor–council government
  - Mayor: Diego Cabral, 2025–2028 (Republicanos)

Area
  - Total: 51.321 km^{2} (19.815 sq mi)
- Elevation: 55 m (180 ft)

Population (2022 Census)
  - Total: 153,658
  - Estimate (2025): 160,318
  - Density: 2,994.1/km^{2} (7,754.6/sq mi)
- Time zone: UTC−3 (Brasília Time)
- Area code: +55 81
- Website: www.camaragibe.pe.gov.br (in Portuguese)

Camaragibe (Recifense portuguese pronunciation: [kɐmɐɾɐˈʒibi]) is a city in the Northeast region of Brazil, in the state of Pernambuco. It lies within the Greater Recife — Brazil's 5th-largest metropolitan area.

Currently, Camaragibe is run by Diego Cabral (from the political party Republicans) and Debora Rocha (The Vice-mayor).

== History ==
The lands now belonging to the city were used as a reserve of wood, and then for sugar planting. It was populated by natives, until the arrival of Portuguese with Duarte Coelho Pereira, around 1500. After the Portuguese arrival, however, the natives were not completely driven from the area.

In the 16th century, the city (then just an engenho) was considered one of the richest in the region until the Dutch invasion in 1645. At that time, the farm was burned to the ground by the natives.

On 13 May 1982, Camaragibe, which was then part of the bigger city São Lourenço da Mata, was elevated to the category of city.

The city is considered among the most densely populated urban areas in the world because of the very accelerated growth that the city experienced from the emancipation until now.

== Geography ==
- State - Pernambuco
- Region - RMR (Recife)
- Boundaries - Paulista (N), Sao Lourenco da Mata (S), Paudalho (W), Recife (E)
- Area - 55.08 km^{2}
- Elevation - 55 m
- Hydrography - Capibaribe and Beberibe rivers
- Vegetation - Hidrofila, capoeira, and sugarcane plantation
- Climate - Hot tropical and humid
- Annual average temperature - 25.1 °C
- Main road - PE 005
- Distance to Recife - 16 km

== Economy ==
The main economic activities in Camaragibe are based in commerce and general industry. Also is a main and terminal stop in the metropolitan train (subway or tube system), with integration with local bus lanes.

=== Economic Indicators ===
Population	GDP x(1000 R$).	GDP pc (R$)	PE	RMR
143.210	492.113	3.608	0.82%	1.22%

Economy by Sector 2006

Primary sector	Secondary sector	Service sector
1.43%	13.35%	85.22%

=== Health Indicators ===
HDI (2000)	Hospitals (2007)	Hospitals beds (2007)	Children's Mortality every 1000 (2005)
0.747	4	1291	15.1

== Notable people ==
- Hélio José Muniz Filho, Brazilian criminal suspected of killing 65 people
- Érica de Sena, racewalker

== See also ==
- List of municipalities in Pernambuco
