= Hélio José Muniz Filho =

Brazilian vigilante murderer

Hélio José Muniz Filho (1977 – 14 January 2001), better known as Helinho, was a Brazilian vigilante murderer. He was accused of killing 65 people.

He was born in Camaragibe, Pernambuco, in the Metropolitan region of Recife.

In 1997, he was sentenced to 201 years in prison in Recife, Pernambuco. On 14 January 2001, 24-year-old Hélio was stabbed in the neck and arm by three inmates at the Anibal Bruno Maximum Security Prison. He was taken to Freitas Octavian Hospital in Recife, where he succumbed to his injuries.
