= Greater Recife =

Coordinates: 8.053889°S 34.880833°W

Grande Recife Região Metropolitana do Recife (RMR)
- Metro Area
- Metropolitan Region of Recife
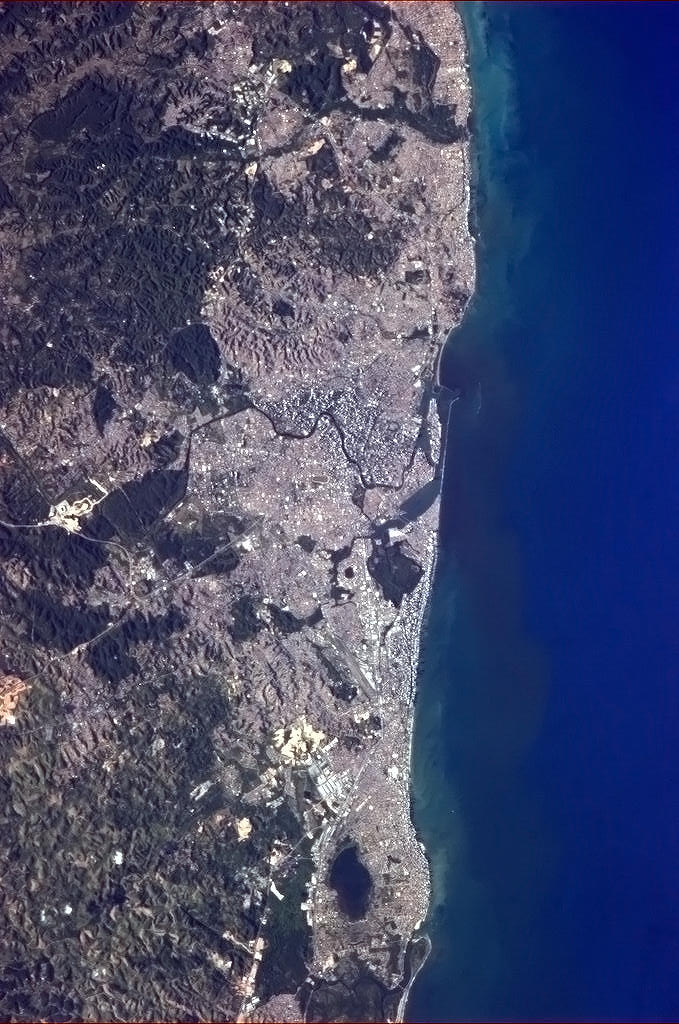
- The RMR seen from the International Space Station

- The Metropolitan Region in Pernambuco (including the former member of Goiana)
- Country: Brazil
- Region: Pernambuco
- State: Pernambuco
- Metropolitan Area established: June 8, 1973
- Recife as Capital: 1827

Area
  - Metro: 2,764.26 km^{2} (1,067.29 sq mi)

Population (2022)
  - Metro Area: 3,726,974
- Time zone: UTC−3 (BRT)
- HDI (2000): 0.734 – high

Recife Metropolitan Area, officially the Metropolitan Region of Recife (Brazilian Portuguese: Região Metropolitana do Recife (RMR), or Grande Recife), is a major metropolitan area in Northeast Brazil with a population of 3.7 million as of 2022, centered on the state capital of Recife, Pernambuco. In 2017, it was ranked as the 8th largest metropolitan region nationally.

The Brazilian Institute of Geography and Statistics (IBGE) defines the region as a "metropolis" in its Area of Influence surveys, in terms of economic and social importance. The region's area of influence covers a large part of Northeast Brazil, including the entire states of Alagoas, Paraíba, and Pernambuco, in addition to portions of Bahia, Ceará, Maranhão, Piauí, Rio Grande do Norte, and Sergipe. Within this area of influence are the smaller cities of Natal, João Pessoa, Maceió, and Aracaju.

== Municipalities ==
The Metropolitan Region is defined in federal and state legislation as consisting of 14 municipalities. Goiana was formerly a part, but left in March 2020. The Immediate Geographic Region (formerly termed microregion) around Recife defined by the IBGE encompasses additional outlying municipalities.

| Municipality | Area (2020, km²) | Population (2010, census) | Population (2020, estimate) | GDP (2017, '000 BRL) | GDP per capita (2017, BRL) |
|---|---|---|---|---|---|
| Abreu e Lima | 126,384 | 94,429 | 100,346 | 2,003,665 | 20,164.90 |
| Araçoiaba | 96,360 | 18,156 | 20,733 | 139,026 | 6,859.40 |
| Cabo de Santo Agostinho | 445,343 | 185,025 | 208,944 | 9,964,401 | 46,689.25 |
| Camaragibe | 51,321 | 144,466 | 158,899 | 1,757,192 | 11,238.05 |
| Igarassu | 306,879 | 102,021 | 118,370 | 2,479,117 | 21,483.19 |
| Ilha de Itamaracá | 66,146 | 21,884 | 26,672 | 239,399 | 9,289.99 |
| Ipojuca | 521,801 | 80,637 | 97,669 | 10,879,739 | 115,089.32 |
| Itapissuma | 73,968 | 23,769 | 26,900 | 1,398,050 | 53,081.09 |
| Jaboatão dos Guararapes | 258,724 | 644,620 | 706,867 | 13,545,569 | 19,463.25 |
| Moreno | 196,073 | 56,696 | 63,294 | 682,663 | 10,989.60 |
| Olinda | 41,300 | 377,779 | 393,115 | 5,438,691 | 13,917.85 |
| Paulista | 96,932 | 300,466 | 334,376 | 4,019,150 | 12,240.33 |
| Recife | 218,843 | 1,537,704 | 1,653,461 | 51,859,618 | 31,743.72 |
| São Lourenço da Mata | 264,190 | 102,895 | 114,079 | 1,107,308 | 9,877.95 |
| Total | 2,764.260 | 3,690,547 | 4,023,725 | 105,513,588 | —N/a |

== Transport ==
=== Airport ===
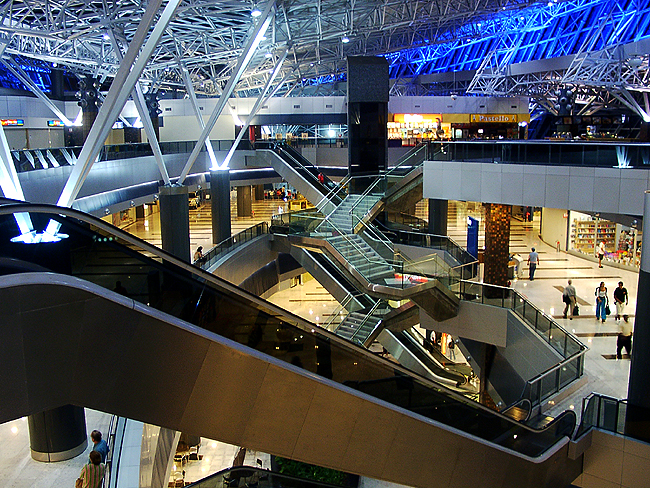
Guararapes International Airport (REC).

Guararapes – Gilberto Freyre International Airport serves the area, and has domestic and international flights.

=== Ports ===
The region is served by Suape and Recife ports.

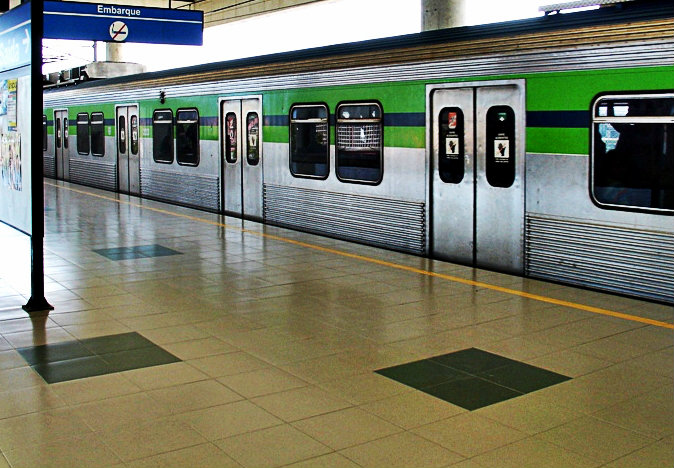
Recife Metro, the second largest in Brazil, after São Paulo.

=== Metro ===
Since 1998, an extension to the Recife Metro is being built. When ready, it will become the second largest in Brazil, after São Paulo.

This system also integrates with several bus lines connected to the bus/metro integration terminals, such as Barro and Joana Bezerra stations. It is possible to ride the metro and the connected bus line by purchasing one ticket only. Since March 2009, Recife Metro has finished one more phase of expansion. The system counts now has 28 stations (11 integrated with buses) and is 39.5 kilometers long.

=== Bus ===
Buses transport over 3 million passengers daily through 224 routes and 4,523 stops.
