= São Lourenço da Mata =

Municipality of Pernambuco, Brazil

- Municipality
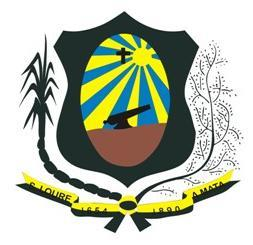
- Flag Coat of arms

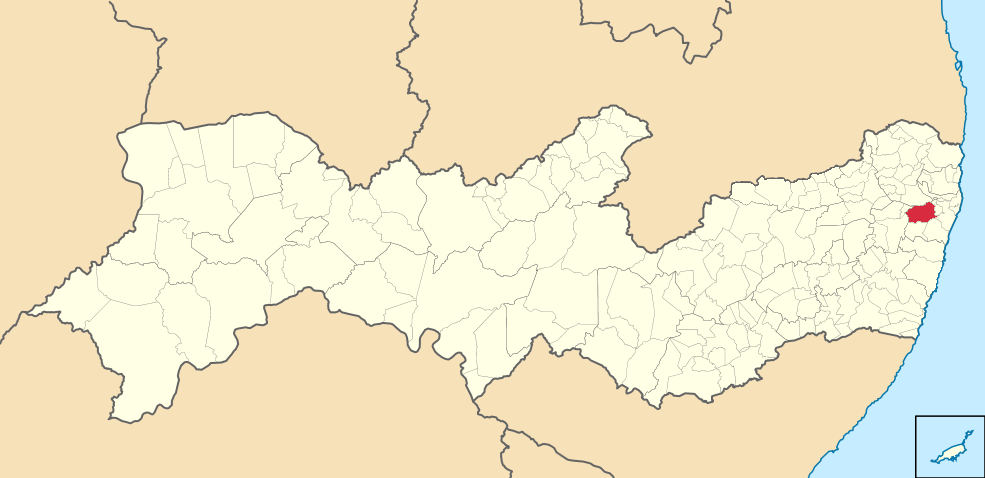
- Location of São Lourenço da Mata in Pernambuco

- Location in Brazil São Lourenço da Mata (South America)
- Coordinates: 8°0′7″S 35°1′4″W
- Country: Brazil
- Region: Northeast
- State: Pernambuco

Area
  - Total: 264.346 km^{2} (102.065 sq mi)
- Elevation: 58 m (190 ft)

Population (2022 Census)
  - Total: 111,249
  - Estimate (2025): 118,258
  - Density: 420.846/km^{2} (1,089.99/sq mi)
- Time zone: UTC−3 (BRT)

São Lourenço da Mata (Recifense portuguese pronunciation: [ˈsɐ̃w loˈɾẽsŭ dɐ ˈmɐtɐ]) is a city located in the greater Recife metropolitan area in the state of Pernambuco, with a population of 111,249 inhabitants (2022 Census). The city was one of the hosts of the 2014 FIFA World Cup. The new Arena Pernambuco is set to boost the local economy with the construction of a new stadium, flats, car parks, hospital, technical school, shopping center, integrated metro-bus station, and road improvements.

== Geography ==
- State - Pernambuco
- Region - RMR (Recife)
- Boundaries - Paudalho (N), Jaboatão dos Guararapes and Moreno, Pernambuco (S), Vitória de Santo Antão and Chã de Alegria (W), Recife and Camaragibe (E)
- Area - 264.35 km^{2}
- Elevation - 16 m
- Hydrography - Capibaribe river
- Vegetation - Atlantic forest, capoeira, capoeirinha, and sugarcane
- Climate - Hot tropical and humid
- Annual average temperature - 25.5 °C
- Main road - PE 005
- Distance to Recife - 18 km

== Economy ==
The main economic activities in São Lourenço da Mata are based in general industry, especially the electrical and transportation sectors.

=== Economic Indicators ===
Population	GDP x (1000 R$).	GDP pc (R$)	PE	RMR
99,945	310.748	3.261	0.51%	0.77%

Economy by Sector 2006

Primary sector	Secondary sector	Service sector
3.39%	18.73%	77.88%

=== Health Indicators ===
HDI (2000)	Hospitals (2007)	Hospitals beds (2007)	Children's Mortality every 1000 (2005)
0.707	1	98	13.4

== See also ==
- List of municipalities in Pernambuco
