= Itapissuma =

Municipality of Pernambuco, Brazil

- City
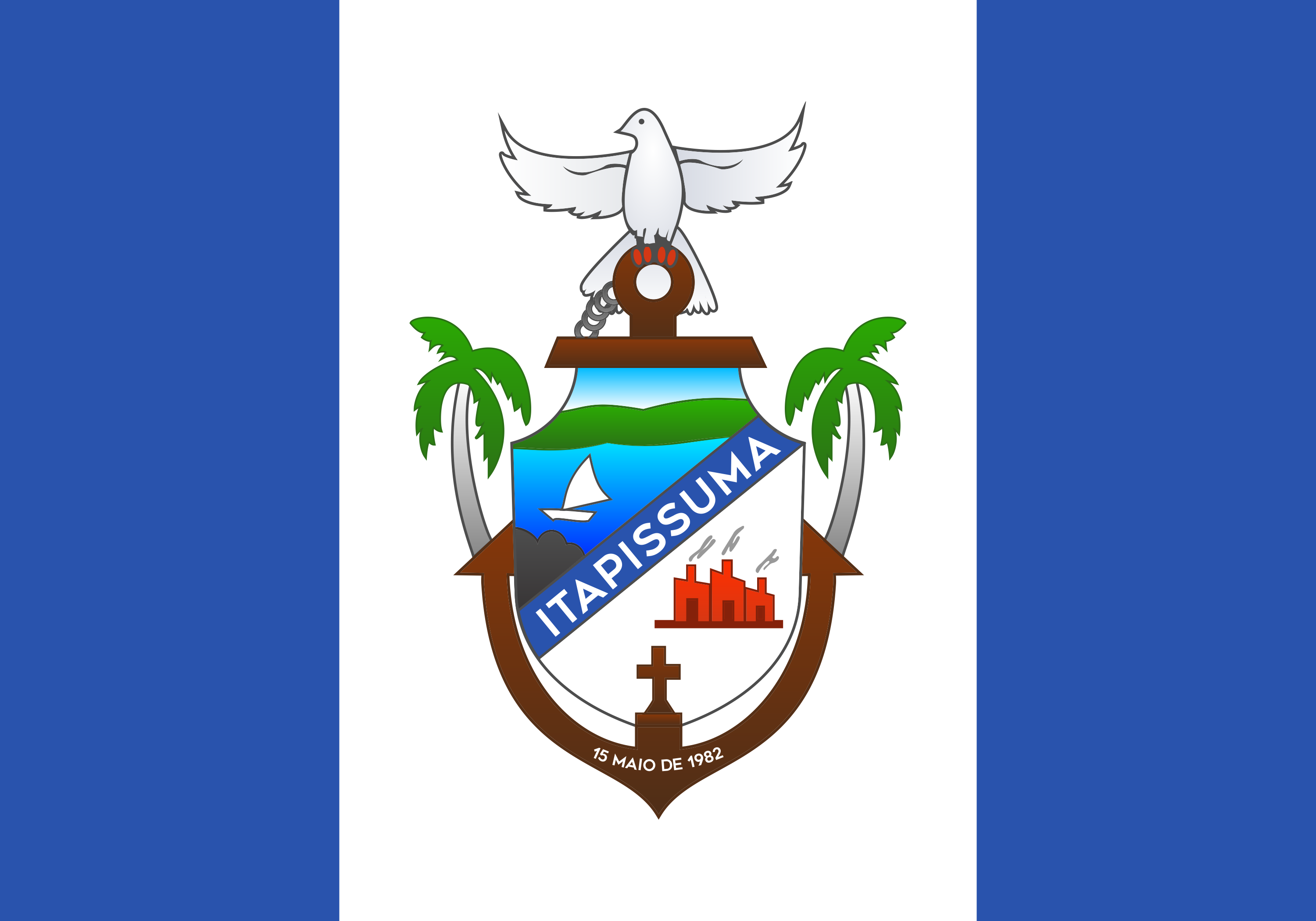
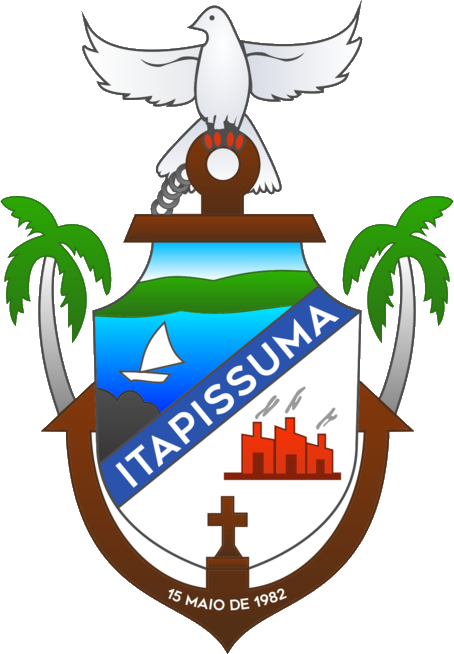
- Flag Coat of arms

- Itapissuma located in Brazil Map
- Coordinates: 07°46′33″S 34°53′31″W
- Country: Brazil
- State: Pernambuco
- Region: RMR (Recife)

Area
  - Total: 74.25 km^{2} (28.67 sq mi)
- Elevation: 7 m (23 ft)

Population (2022 Census)
  - Total: 27,749
  - Estimate (2025): 29,669
- Time zone: [[UTCBRT]]
  - Summer (DST): −3
- Average Temperature: 25.3 °C (77.5 °F)

Itapissuma (Central northeastern portuguese pronunciation: [itɐpiˈsumɐ]) is a city in the state of Pernambuco, Brazil. It is integrated in the Recife metropolitan area with another 13 cities. Itapissuma has a total area of 74.25 square kilometers and had an estimated population of 26,900 inhabitants in 2020 according to the IBGE. The city has the best children's mortality rate in the metropolitan area and has also the second highest GDP per capita after Ipojuca.

== Geography ==
- State - Pernambuco
- Region - RMR (Recife)
- Boundaries - Goiana (N), Igarassu (S and W), and Itamaraca (E)
- Area - 74.25 km^{2}
- Elevation - 7 m (22 ft)
- Hydrography - Small coast river
- Vegetation - Mangrove, coconut trees and sugarcane plantation
- Climate - Hot tropical and humid
- Annual average temperature - 25.3 c
- Main road - BR 101 and PE 035
- Distance to Recife - 39 km

== Economy ==
The main economic activities in Itapissuma are based in metallurgic (aluminium) and general industry (which counts for 63% of the local economy) and the primary sector especially farms with pigs and coconut.

=== Economic Indicators ===
Population	GDP x(1000 R$).	GDP pc (R$)	PE	RMR
24.026	424.898	18.593	0.71%	1.06%

Economy by Sector (2006)

Primary sector	Secondary sector	Service sector
4.01%	63.36%	32.63%

=== Health Indicators ===
HDI (2000)	Hospitals (2012)	Hospitals beds (2007)	Children's Mortality every 1000 (2005)
0.695	2	8	7.4 (best rate in RMR)

== See also ==
- List of municipalities in Pernambuco
