= Olinda =

Municipality in Pernambuco, Brazil

- Municipality
- Municipality of Olinda
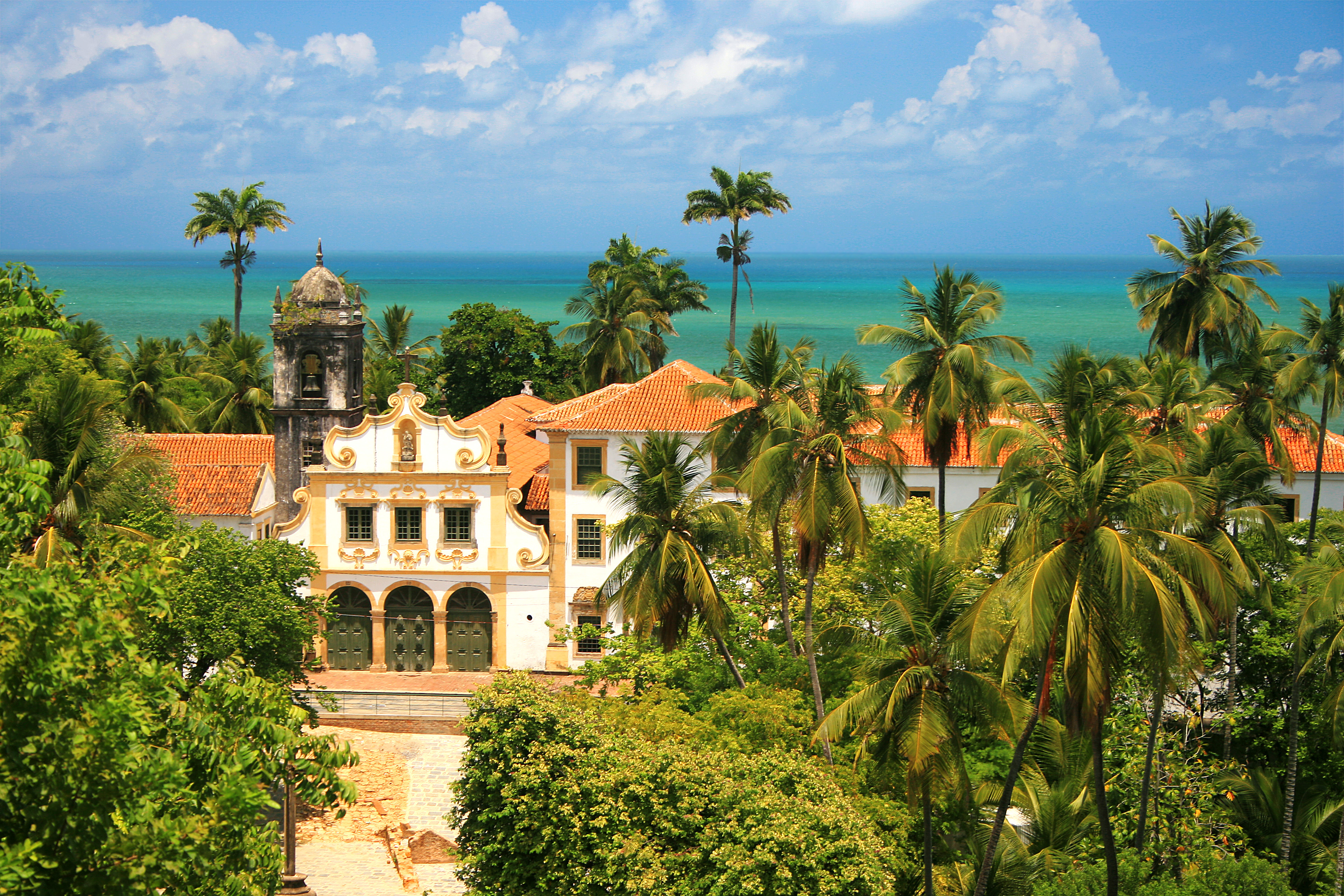
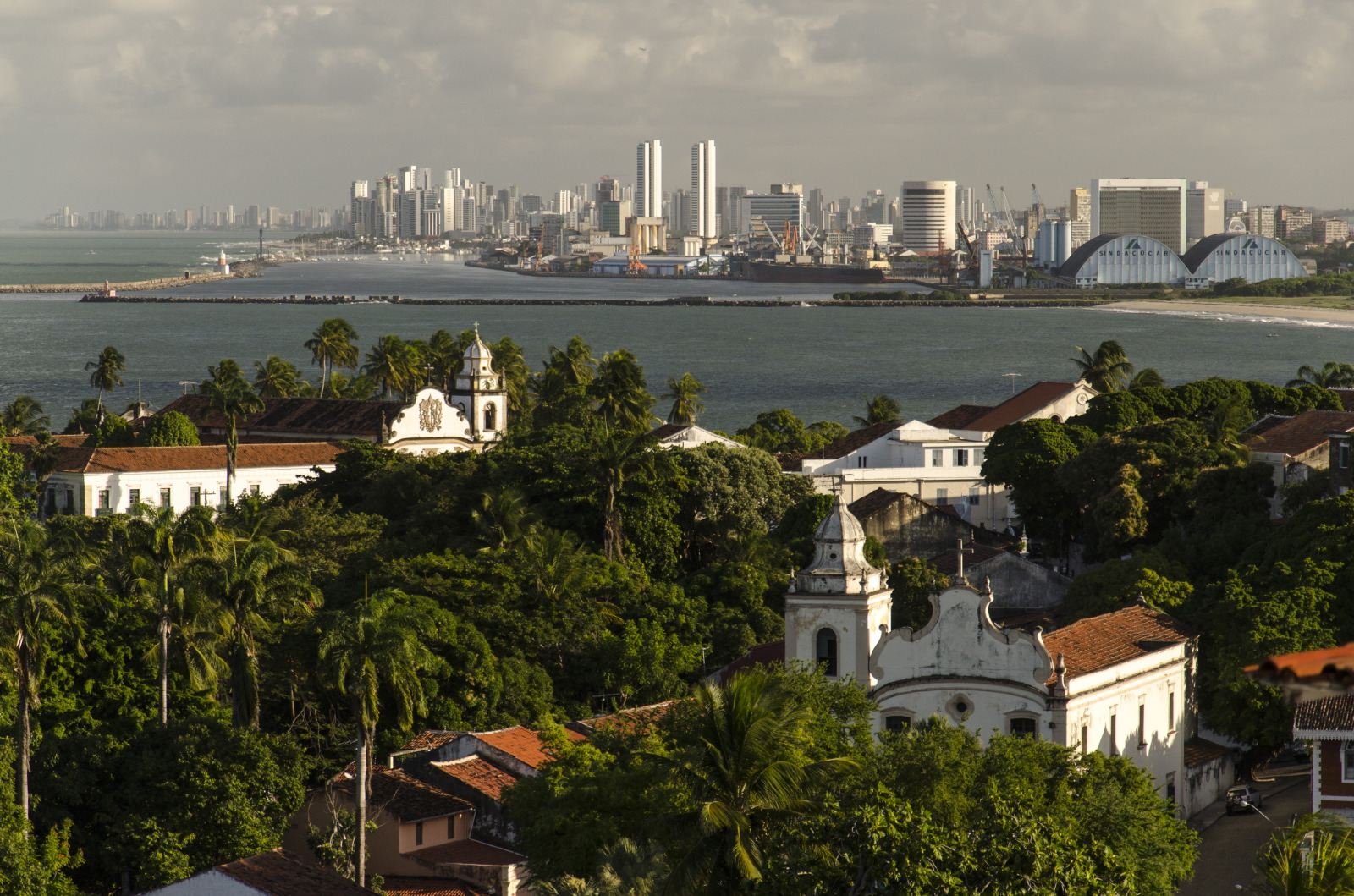
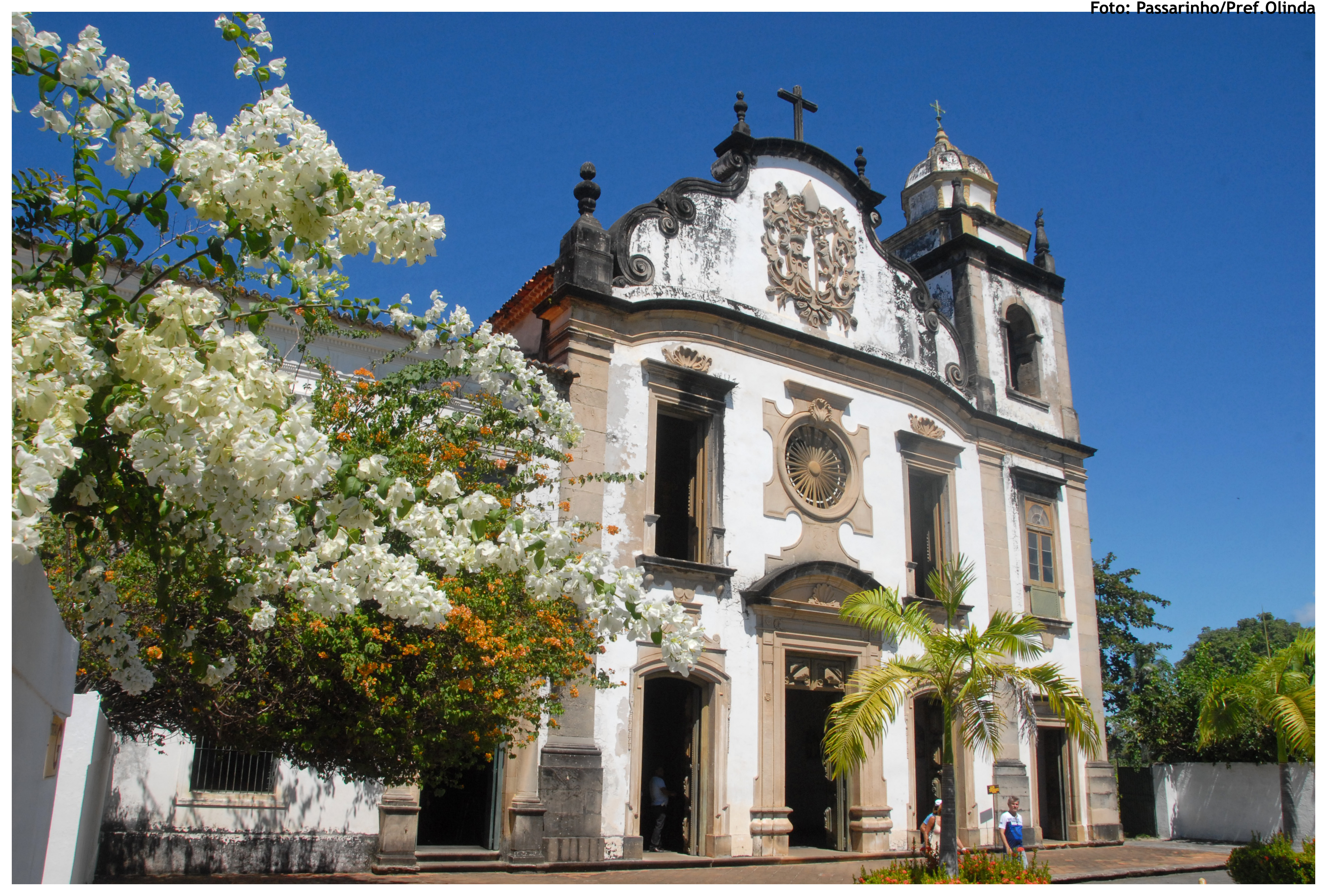
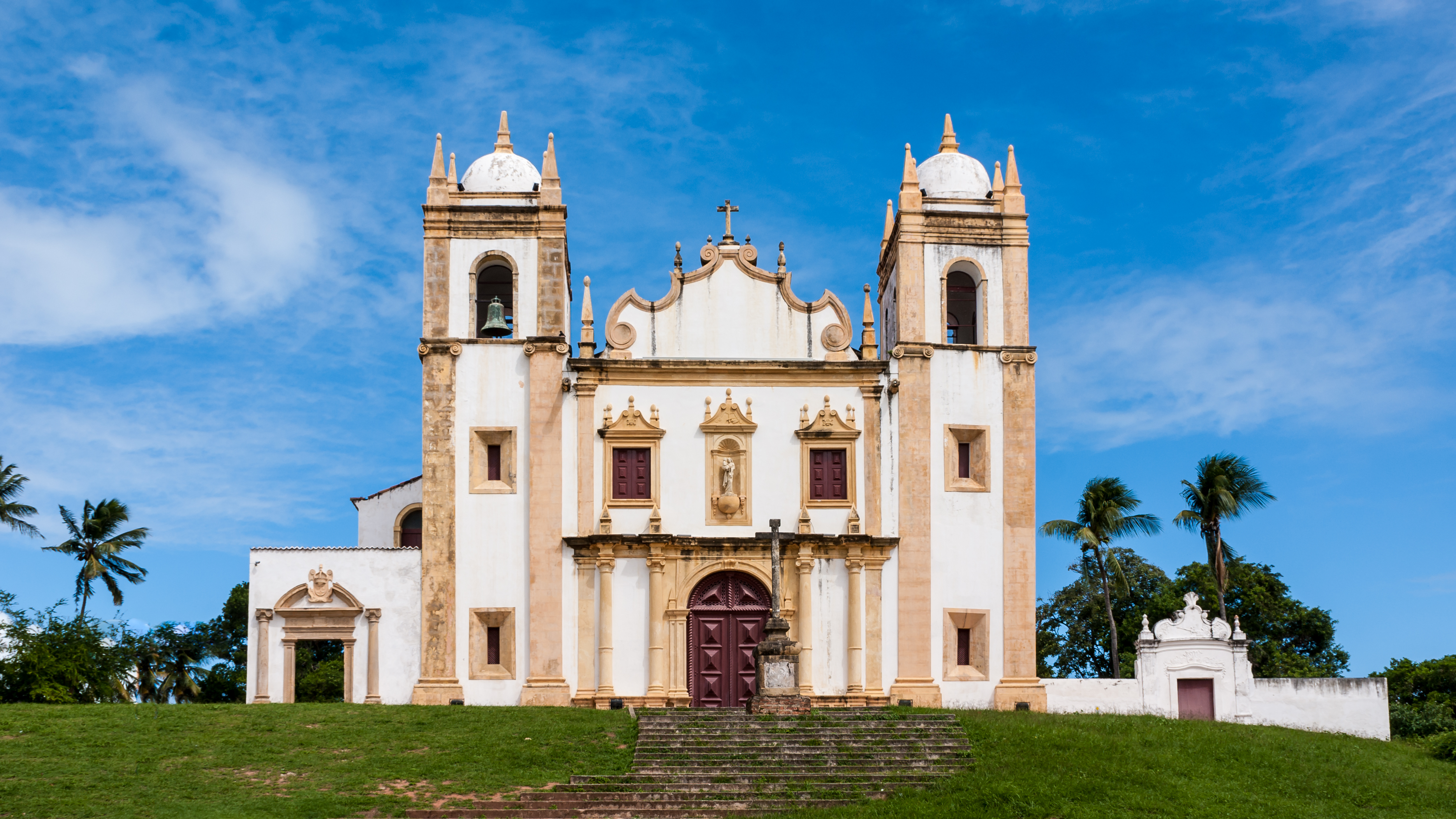
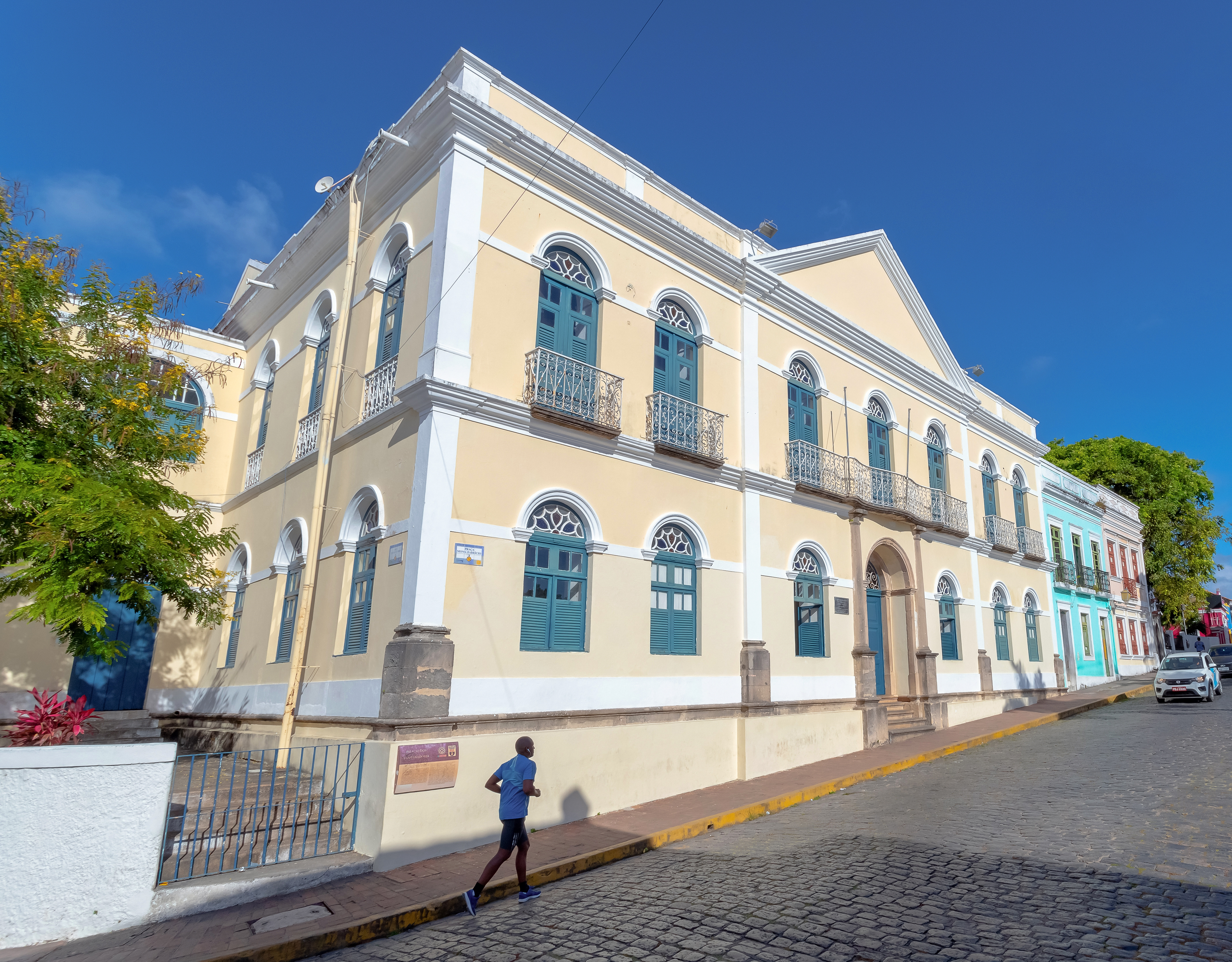
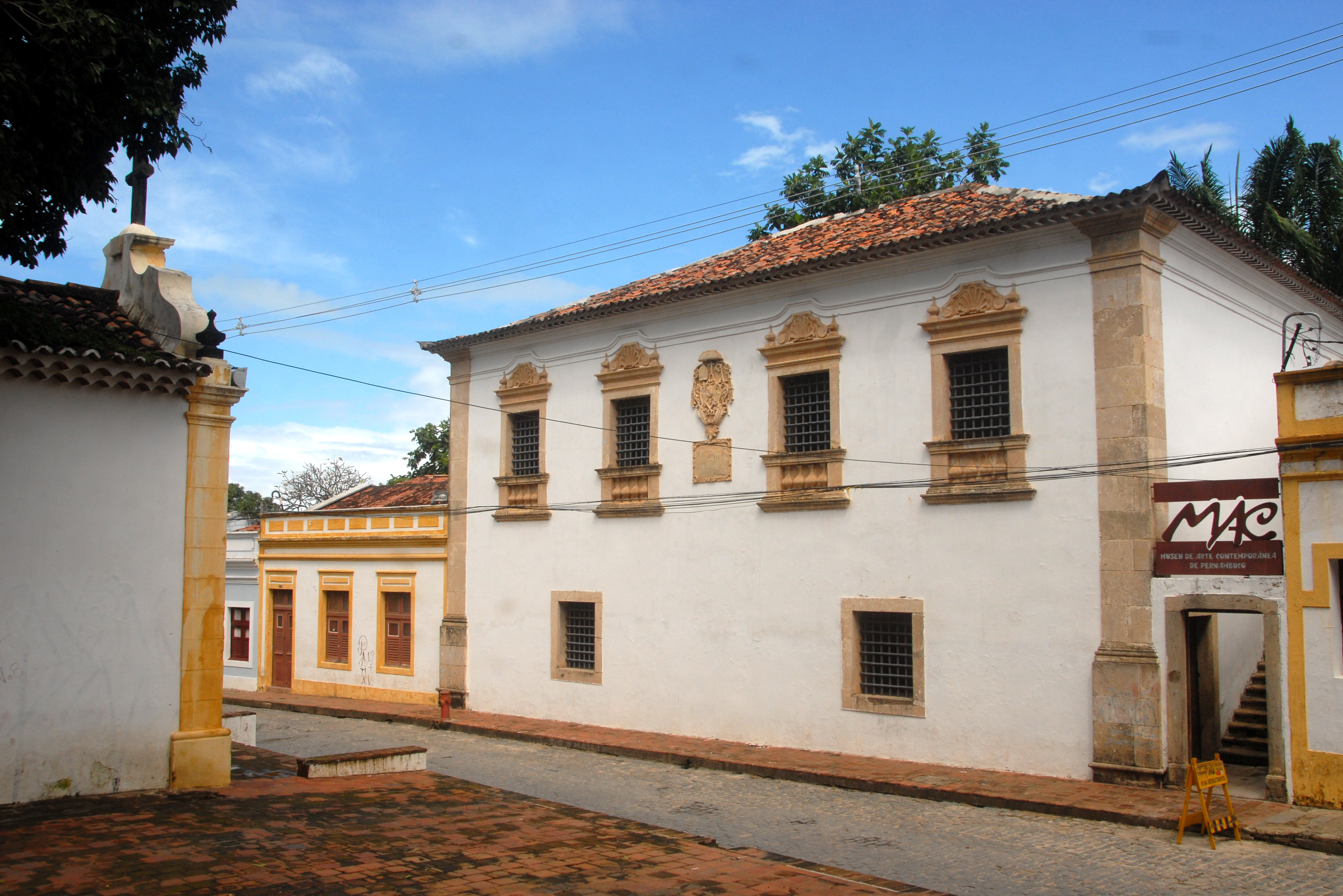
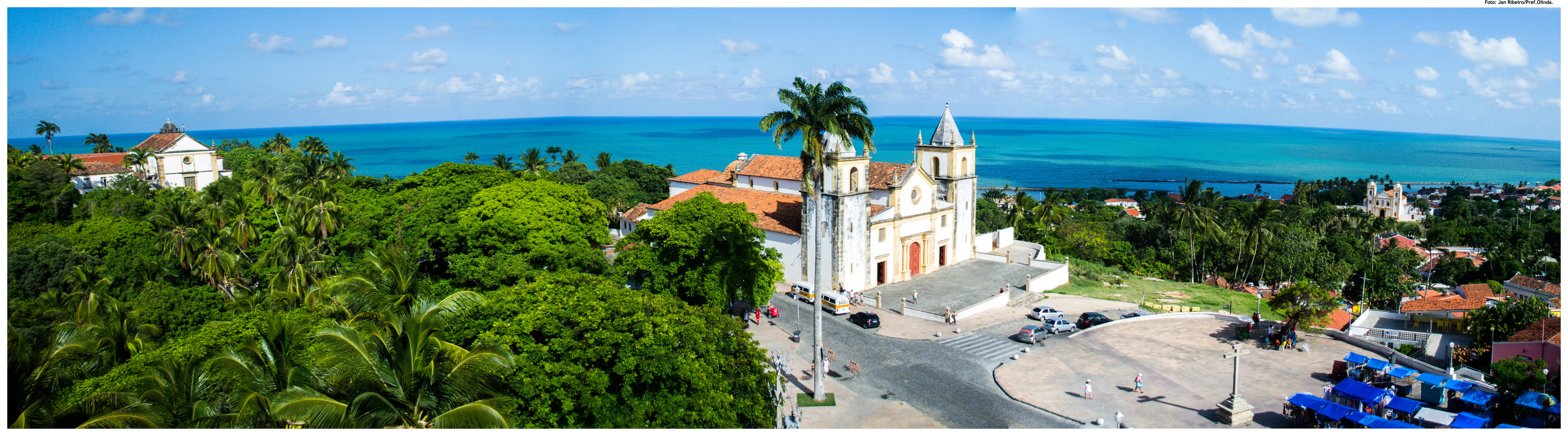

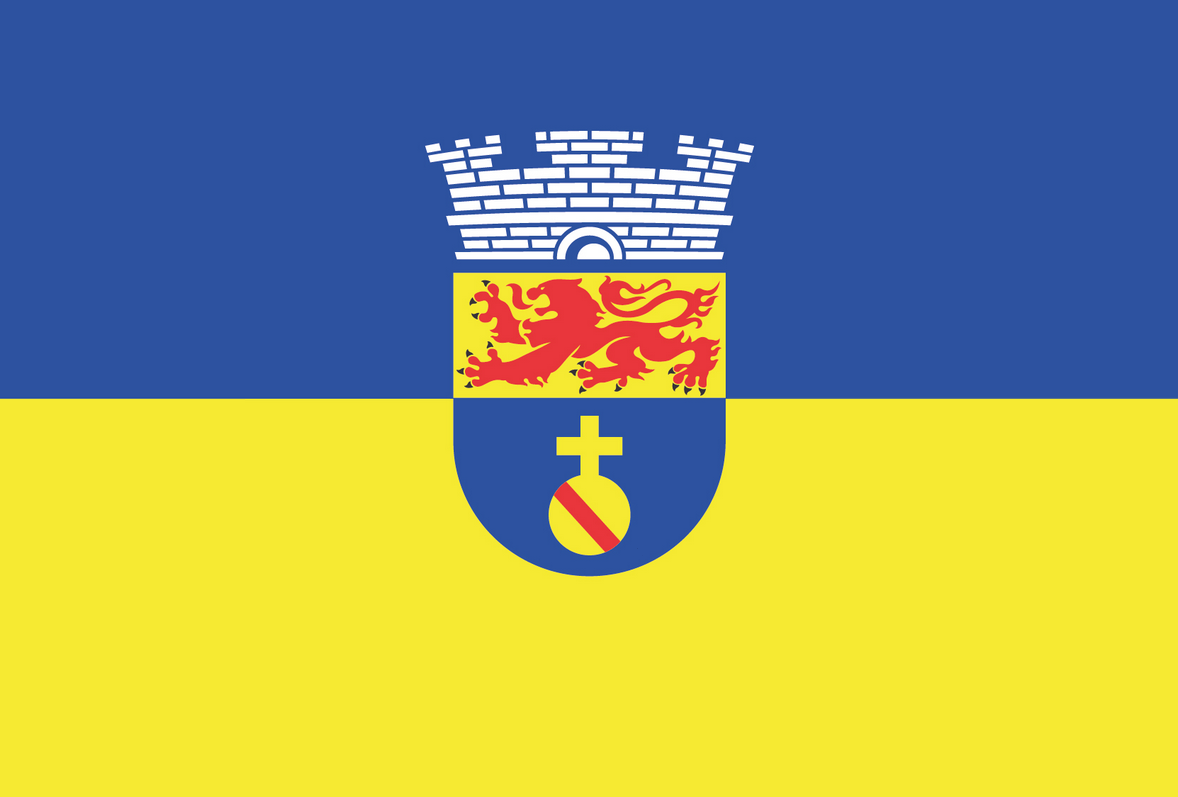
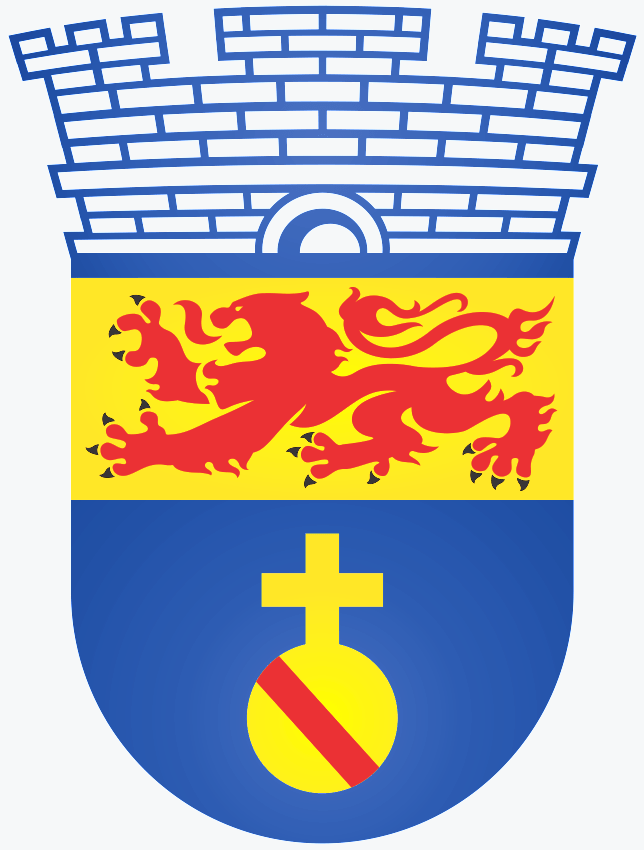
- Flag Coat of arms

- Location in Pernambuco

- Location in Brazil
- Coordinates: 8°0′32″S 34°51′18″W
- Country: Brazil
- Region: Northeast
- State: Pernambuco
- Founded: March 12, 1535
- Incorporated (as village): 1537
- Incorporated (as city): 1676

Government
  - Mayor: Mirella Almeida (PSD)

Area
  - Municipality: 43.55 km^{2} (16.81 sq mi)
  - Metro: 2,768 km^{2} (1,069 sq mi)
- Elevation: 16 m (52 ft)

Population (2022 Brazilian census)
  - Municipality: 349,976
  - Estimate (2025): 364,717
  - Density: 8,036/km^{2} (20,810/sq mi)
  - Metro: 3,768,902
- Time zone: UTC−3 (BRT)
- HDI (2010): 0.735 – high
- Website: www.olinda.pe.gov.br

Olinda (Portuguese pronunciation: [ɔˈlĩdɐ]) is a historic city in Pernambuco, Brazil, in the Northeast Region. It is located on the country's northeastern Atlantic Ocean coast, in the Metropolitan Region of Recife, the state capital. It has a population of 349,976 people, covers 41.681 square kilometres (16.093 mi^{2}), and has a population density of 9,437 inhabitants per square kilometre (24,440/sq mi). It is noted as one of the best-preserved colonial cities in Brazil and has been inhabited since 1535.

As the former capital of the Captaincy of Pernambuco during the colonial era, Olinda has many historical buildings—the center was declared a UNESCO World Heritage Site in 1982—and a rich culture. The Carnaval of Olinda, a popular street party, is very similar to traditional Portuguese carnivals, with the addition of African influenced dances, reflecting the history of the Northeast. All the festivities are celebrated on the streets with no bleachers or roping, and, unlike in other cities, admission is free. There are hundreds of small musical groups (sometimes featuring a single performer) in many genres.

== History ==
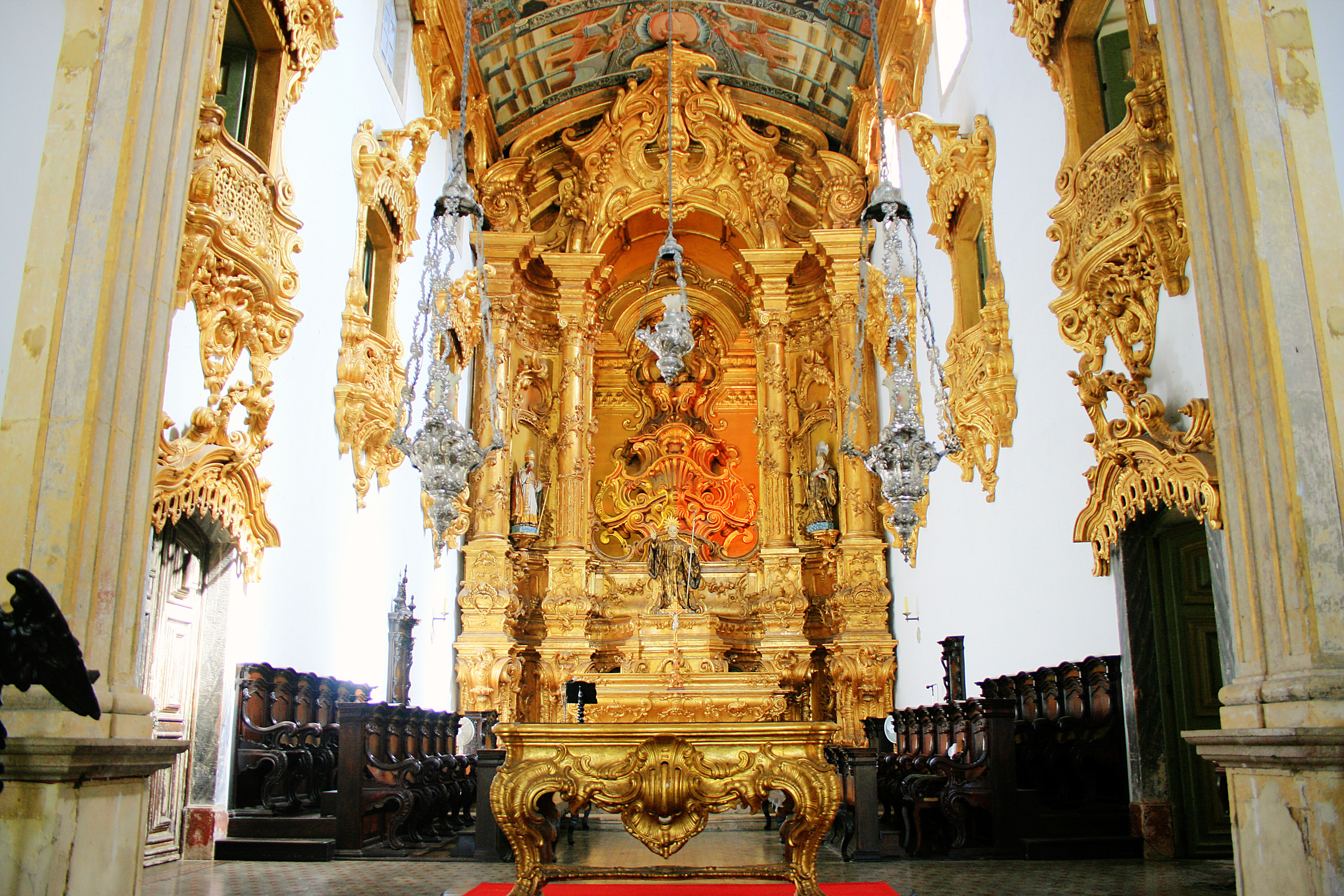
Main altar of Saint Benedict Church.

Historic Centre of the Town of Olinda
UNESCO World Heritage Site
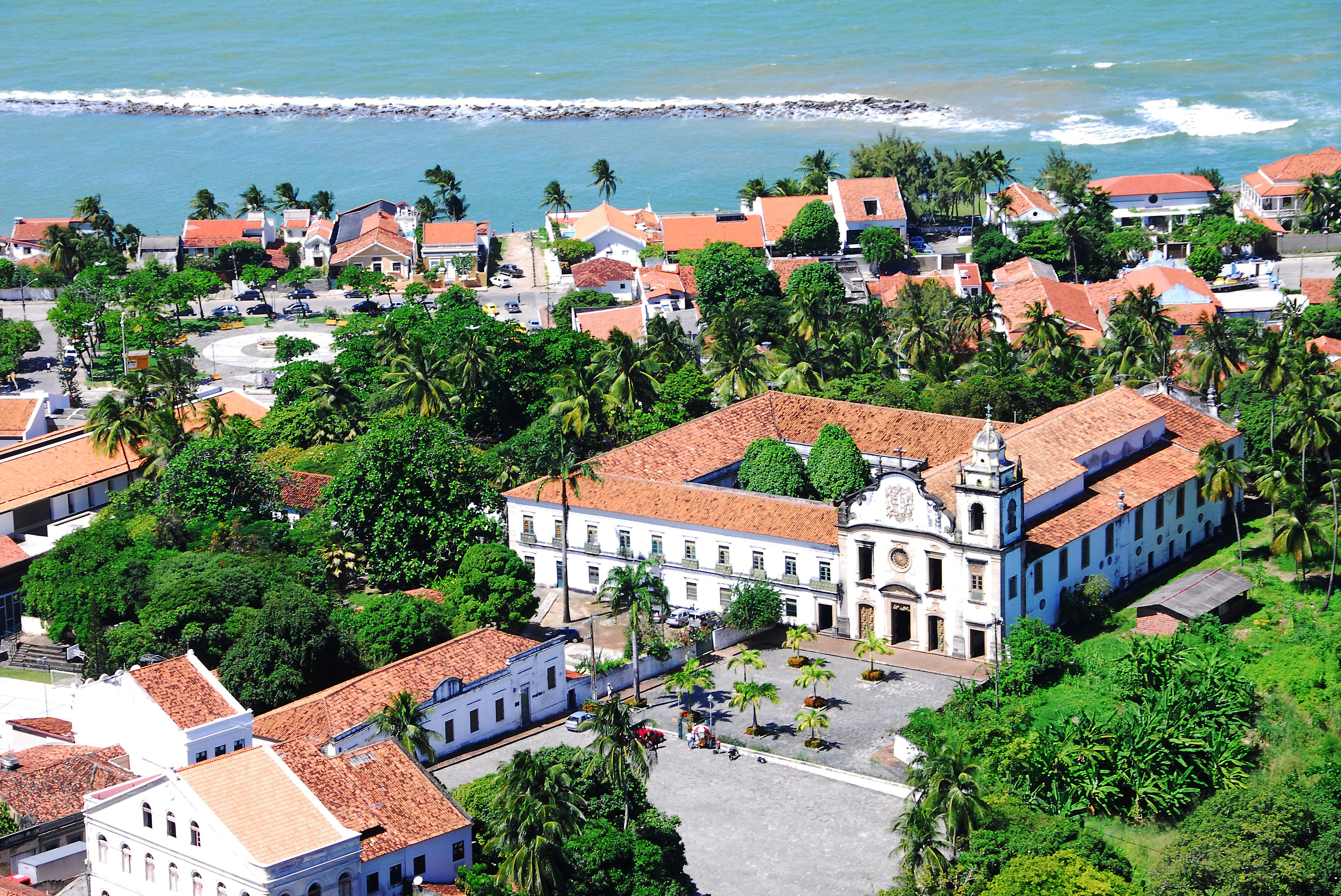
- View of Olinda
- Interactive map of Historic Centre of the Town of Olinda
- Criteria: Cultural: ii, iv
- Reference: 189
- Inscription: 1982 (6th Session)
- Area: 120 ha (300 acres)
- Buffer zone: 920 ha (2,300 acres)

Several indigenous tribes occupied the coast of Northeastern Brazil for several thousand years, and the hills of the present day municipality of Olinda had settlements of Caetés and Tupinambá tribes, which were frequently at war. French mercenaries are thought to be the first Europeans to reach the region, but the Portuguese exploited intertribal rivalries and managed to build a stronghold on the former Caeté village on a high hill. Recent studies by the Federal University of Pernambuco have uncovered new evidence of the pre-colonial population of the area.

The settlement of Olinda was founded in 1535 by Duarte Coelho Pereira, from Portugal; it was elevated to a town on March 12, 1537. It was made the seat of the Roman Catholic Territorial Prelature of Pernambuco in 1614, becoming the Diocese of Olinda in 1676. The economy of the region was dominated by the production of sugarcane. This, combined with the importing of slaves from Africa to support cultivation made Olinda a colonial stronghold.

Olinda was the capital of the Portuguese hereditary captaincy of Pernambuco, but was burned by Dutch invaders. The Portuguese built their town on the hill, for practical purposes (eg, sewers) and to make it easier to defend. In the 17th century the Kingdom of Portugal was united with Spain (the 1580-1640 Iberian Union). Taking advantage of this period of Portuguese weakness, the area around Olinda and Recife was occupied by the Dutch who gained access to the Portuguese sugarcane plantations. John Maurice, Prince of Nassau-Siegen was appointed as the governor of the Dutch possessions in Brazil in 1637 by the Dutch West India Company on recommendation of Frederick Henry. He landed at Recife, the port of Pernambuco and the chief stronghold of the Dutch, in January 1637. By a series of successful expeditions, he gradually extended the Dutch possessions from Sergipe on the south to São Luís de Maranhão in the north. He likewise conquered the Portuguese possessions of Saint George del Mina, Saint Thomas, and Luanda, Angola, on the west coast of Africa. After the dissolution of the Iberian Union in 1640, Portugal would reestablish its authority over the lost territories of the Portuguese Empire, including the former Dutch Brazil. Sugarcane plantation slavery would continue to be a source of wealth in Olinda until the Lei Áurea ("Golden Law") abolished slavery in an independent Brazil in 1888.

Olinda declined in importance after the Dutch invasion. Recife became the capital of Pernambuco in 1827, and Olinda is part of the greater Recife metropolitan area. Due to the historic position of the city, its cathedral, a World Heritage Site, called São Salvador do Mundo, remains the primary seat of the Roman Catholic Archdiocese of Olinda and Recife, with a co-cathedral in Recife. Olinda also has a Minor Basilica, again a World Heritage Site (Minor): Basílica Abacial do Mosteiro de São Bento de Olinda.

Besides its natural beauty, Olinda is also one of Brazil's main cultural centers: in 1982 it was declared a World Heritage Site by UNESCO. The city relives the magnificence of the past every year during the large Carnival, to the rhythms of frevo, maracatu and other northeast music and dances.

The current mayor is Mirella Almeida; she succeeded Lupércio do Nascimento as mayor in 2025.

== Geography ==
Olinda is located on the coast of the state of Pernambuco, six kilometers north of the center of Recife. It is bordered by the Atlantic Ocean to the east, the municipality of Paulista to the north, and Recife to the south and west. It is part of the Metropolitan Region of Recife (RMR).

The average elevation is 16 m above sea level. The landscapes is made of plains and hills, some of them steep. Olinda is mostly drained by the Paratibe River (55.13% of the territory), with the remainder drained by the Capibaribe River. The municipality is in the Atlantic Forest ecoregion.

Olinda has a tropical monsoon type climate (Köppen-Geiger: Am), typical of the eastern section of the northeastern Brazilian coast, with average monthly temperatures consistently above 18 °C, little diurnal variation in temperature, abundant rainfall most of the year, and high relative humidity.

== Economy ==
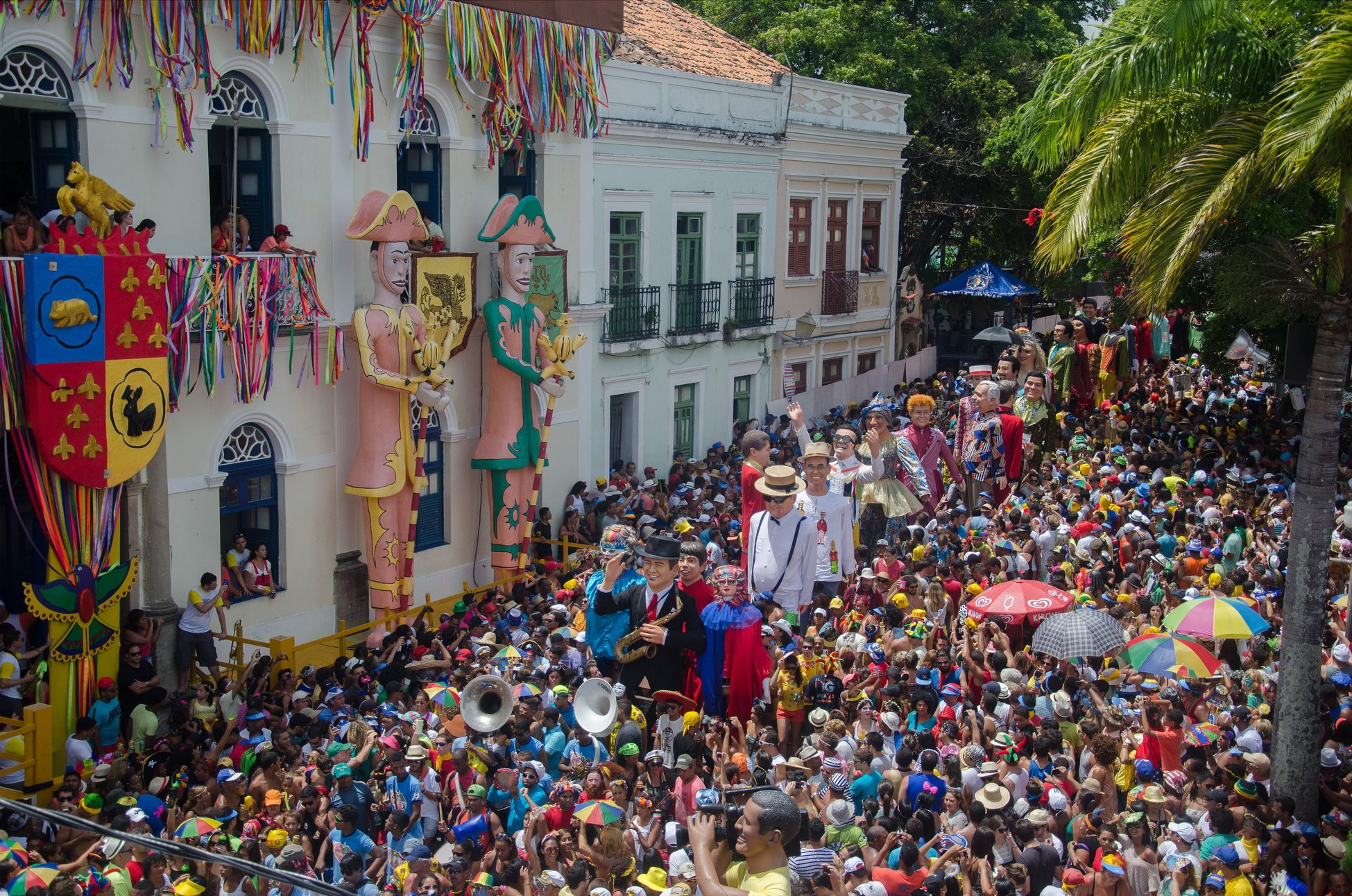
Giant Dolls at the Olinda Carnival.

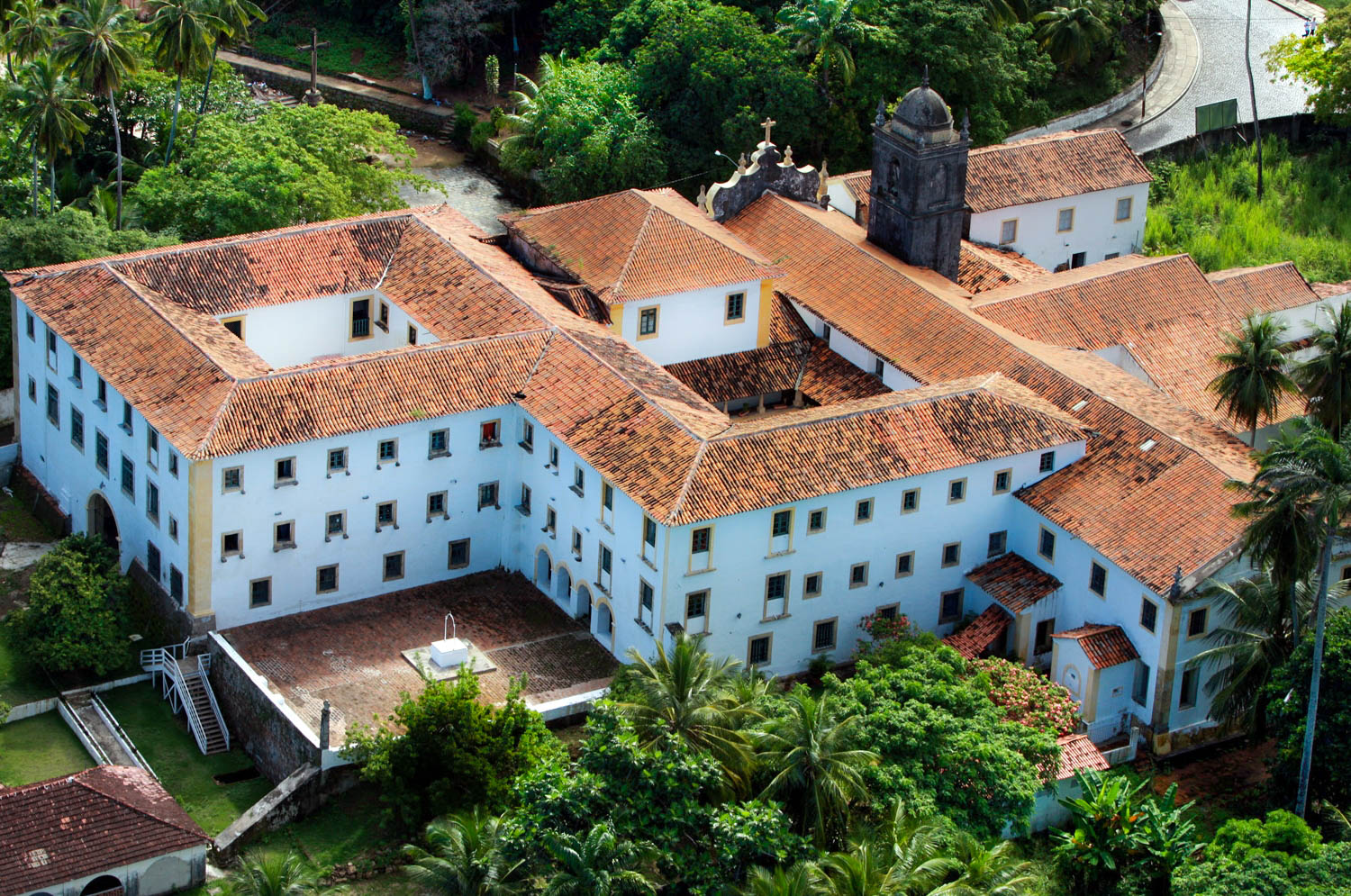
Church of Our Lady of the Snows, Saint Roch Chapel and San Francisco Convent.

The main economic activities in Olinda are based in tourism, commerce, transportation industry and artcraft. The tourist sector has a boom every Carnival when thousands of people are in the old historic town center.

=== Economic indicators ===
Population	GDP x(1000 R$).	GDP pc (R$)	PE	RMR
397,268	2,179,183	5,567	3.54%	5.39%

Economy by Sector

Primary sector	Secondary sector	Service sector
0.17%	18.70%	81.13%

== Gallery ==
=== Historic Center ===
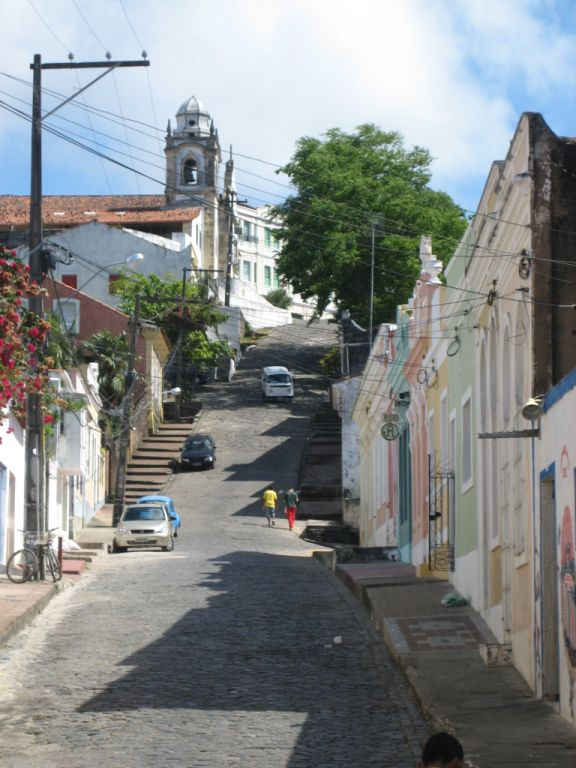
One of the roads of the historic center

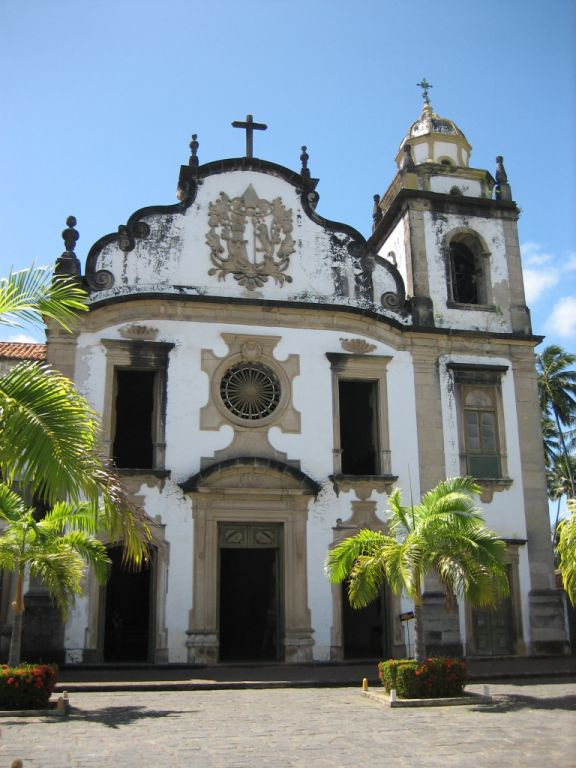
A church in the historic center

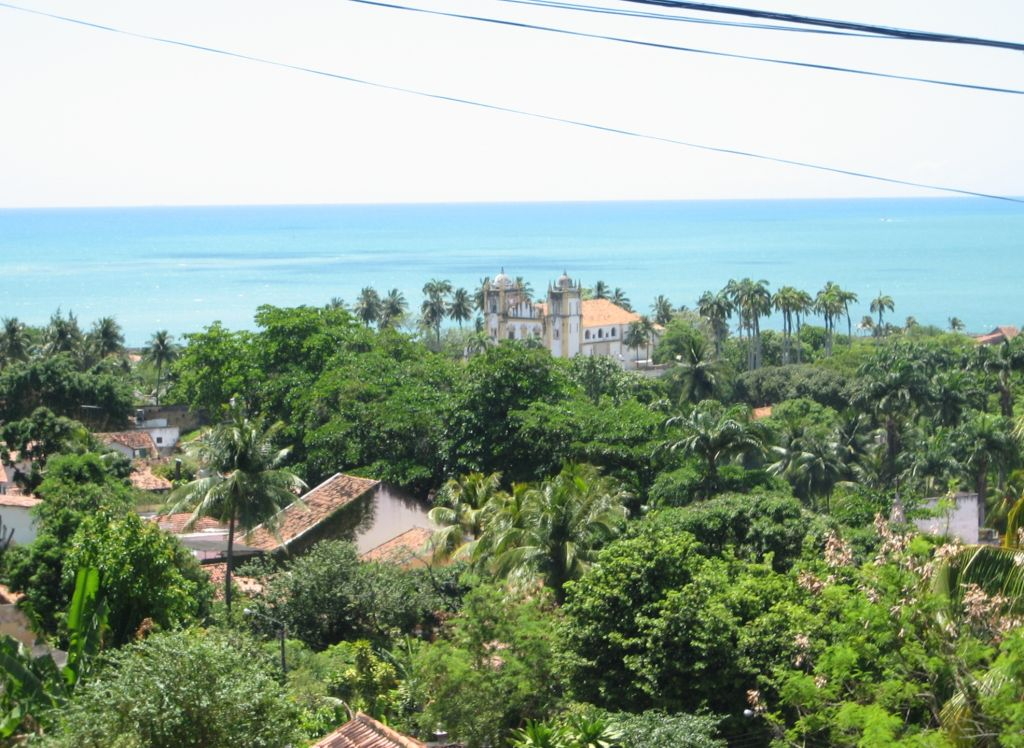
Distant view of historic center with sea behind

== See also ==
- List of municipalities in Pernambuco
- List of museums in Pernambuco
