= Lagoa do Itaenga =

Municipality of Pernambuco, Brazil

- Municipality of Pernambuco, Brazil
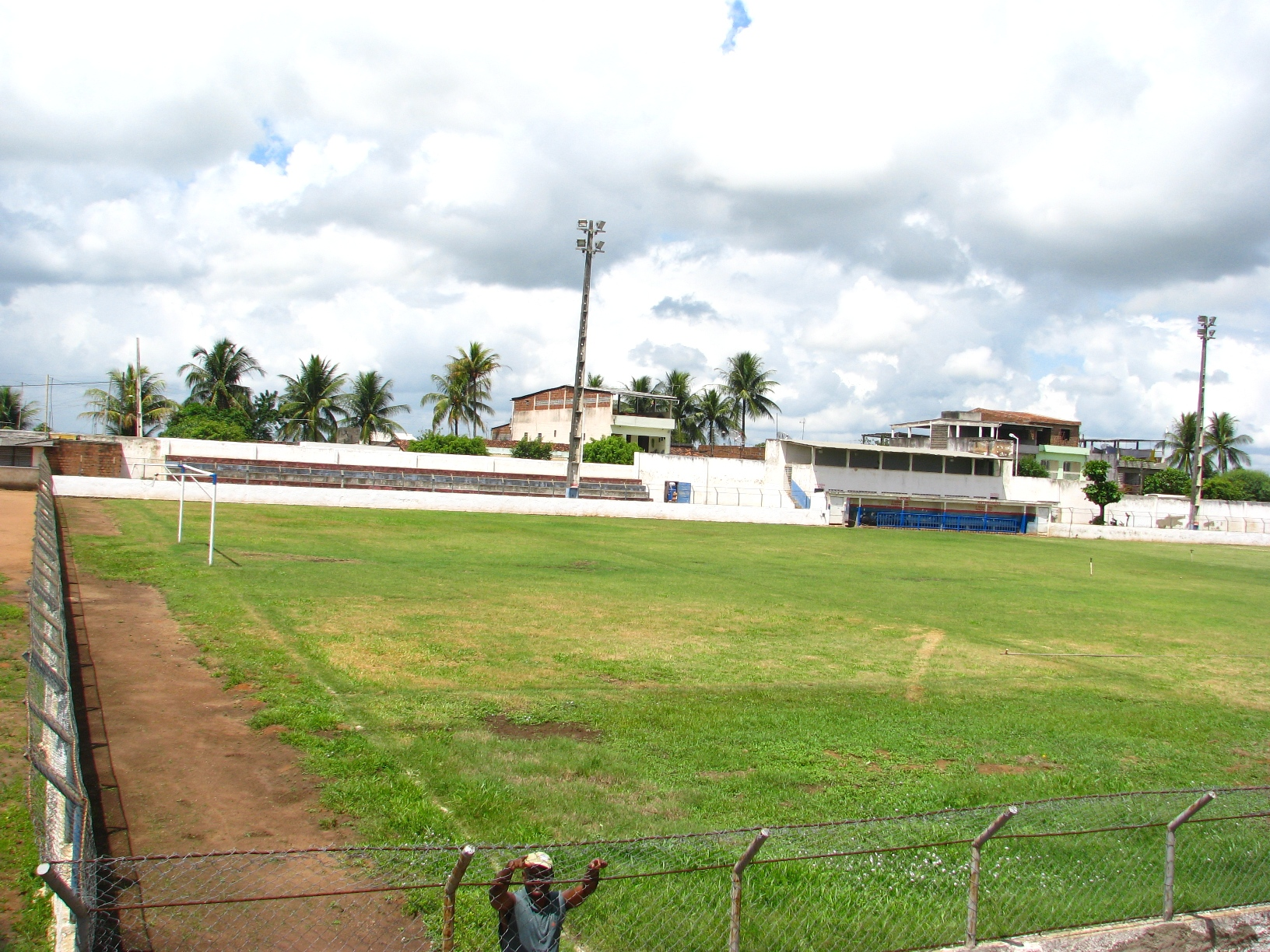
- O Caldeirão Stadium in Lagoa do Itaenga

- Coat of arms
- Etymology: Lagoa meaning "lake" in Brazilian Portuguese, referring to the existence of a lake in the municipality, and Itaenga derived from the Tupi-Guarani language, Ita meaning "large stone" and enga meaning "wild vegetation"
- Motto(s): Brazilian Portuguese: Progresso e bem estar social English: Progress and social well-being
- Location of Lagoa do Itaenga in Pernambuco

- Location within Brazil Location within South America
- Coordinates: 7°56′0″S 35°17′40″W
- Country: Brazil
- Region: Northeast
- State: Pernambuco
- Founded: 20 December 1963

Government
  - Mayor: Dimas Caetano de Sousa (Republicanos) (2025-2028)
  - Vice Mayor: Estênio Ferreira Oliveira da Silva (Avante) (2025-2028)

Area
  - Total: 57.298 km^{2} (22.123 sq mi)
- Elevation: 183 m (600 ft)

Population (2022 Census)
  - Total: 19,003
  - Estimate (2025): 19,863
  - Density: 338.55/km^{2} (876.8/sq mi)
- Demonym: Itaenguense (Brazilian Portuguese)
- Time zone: UTC-03:00 (Brasília Time)
- Postal code: 55840-000
- HDI (2010): 0.602 – medium
- Website: itaenga.pe.gov.br

Lagoa do Itaenga (Central northeastern portuguese pronunciation: [lɐˈɡoɐ du itɐˈẽɡɐ]) (also written as Lagoa de Itaenga) is a municipality located in the state of Pernambuco, Brazil. It is located 78 km from Recife, the capital of Pernambuco. As of the 2022 census, it had a population of 19,003.

== Geography ==
- State - Pernambuco
- Region - Zona da mata Pernambucana
- Boundaries - Carpina and Lagoa do Carro (N); Glória do Goitá (S); Paudalho (E); Feira Nova and Limoeiro (W)
- Area - 57.9 km^{2}
- Elevation - 183 m
- Hydrography - Capibaribe River
- Vegetation - Subcaducifólia and Caducifólia forests
- Climate - Hot tropical and humid
- Annual average temperature - 24.6 c
- Distance to Recife - 78 km

== Economy ==
The main economic activities in Lagoa de Itaenga are largely dominated by the food & beverage industry (77%) and agribusiness, especially sugarcane and cattle.

=== Economic indicators ===
Population	GDP x(1000 R$).	GDP pc (R$)	PE
20.618	118.244	5.916	0.20%

Economy by Sector

2006

Primary sector	Secondary sector	Service sector
9.04%	38.43%	52.53%

=== Health indicators ===
HDI (2000)	Hospitals (2007)	Hospitals beds (2007)	Children's Mortality every 1000 (2005)
0.638	1	31	19.4

== See also ==
- List of municipalities in Pernambuco
