= Glória do Goitá =

Municipality of Pernambuco, Brazil

- City
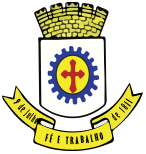
- Coat of arms

- Glória do Goitá located in Brazil map
- Coordinates: 08°00′07″S 35°17′34″W
- Country: Brazil
- State: Pernambuco
- Region: Zona da Mata

Area
  - Total: 231.19 km^{2} (89.26 sq mi)
- Elevation: 158 m (518 ft)

Population (2022 Census)
  - Total: 29,347
  - Estimate (2025): 30,420
- Time zone: UTC−3 (BRT)
- Average Temperature: 24.4 °C (75.9 °F)

Glória do Goitá (Central northeastern portuguese pronunciation: [ˈɡlɔɾjɐ du ɡojˈtɐ]) is a city in Pernambuco, Brazil. It is located in Zona da mata Pernambucana at 75 km of the state capital Recife.

== Geography ==
- State - Pernambuco
- Region - Zona da mata Pernambucana
- Boundaries - Feira Nova, Paudalho and Lagoa do Itaenga (N); Vitória de Santo Antão (S); Chã de Alegria (E); Passira (W)
- Area - 231.19 km^{2}
- Elevation - 158 m
- Hydrography - Capibaribe River
- Vegetation - Caducifólia forest
- Climate - Hot, tropical, and humid
- Annual average temperature - 24.4 c
- Distance to Recife - 75 km

== Economy ==
The main economic activities in Glória do Goitá are based in industry, commerce and agribusiness, especially plantations of sugarcane, coconuts, manioc, and the raising of cattle, goats, sheep and poultry.

=== Economic indicators ===
Population	GDP x(1000 R$).	GDP pc (R$)	PE
30,420	78.692	2.872	0.13%

Economy by sector (2006)

Primary sector	Secondary sector	Service sector
14.05%	9.34%	76.61%

=== Health indicators ===
HDI (2000)	Hospitals (2007)	Hospitals beds (2007)	Children's mortality every 1000 (2005)
0.636	1	21	17.4

== See also ==
- List of municipalities in Pernambuco
