= Limoeiro Bridge =

Bridge in Recife, Pernambuco, Brazil

Coordinates: 8.0506°S 34.8731°W

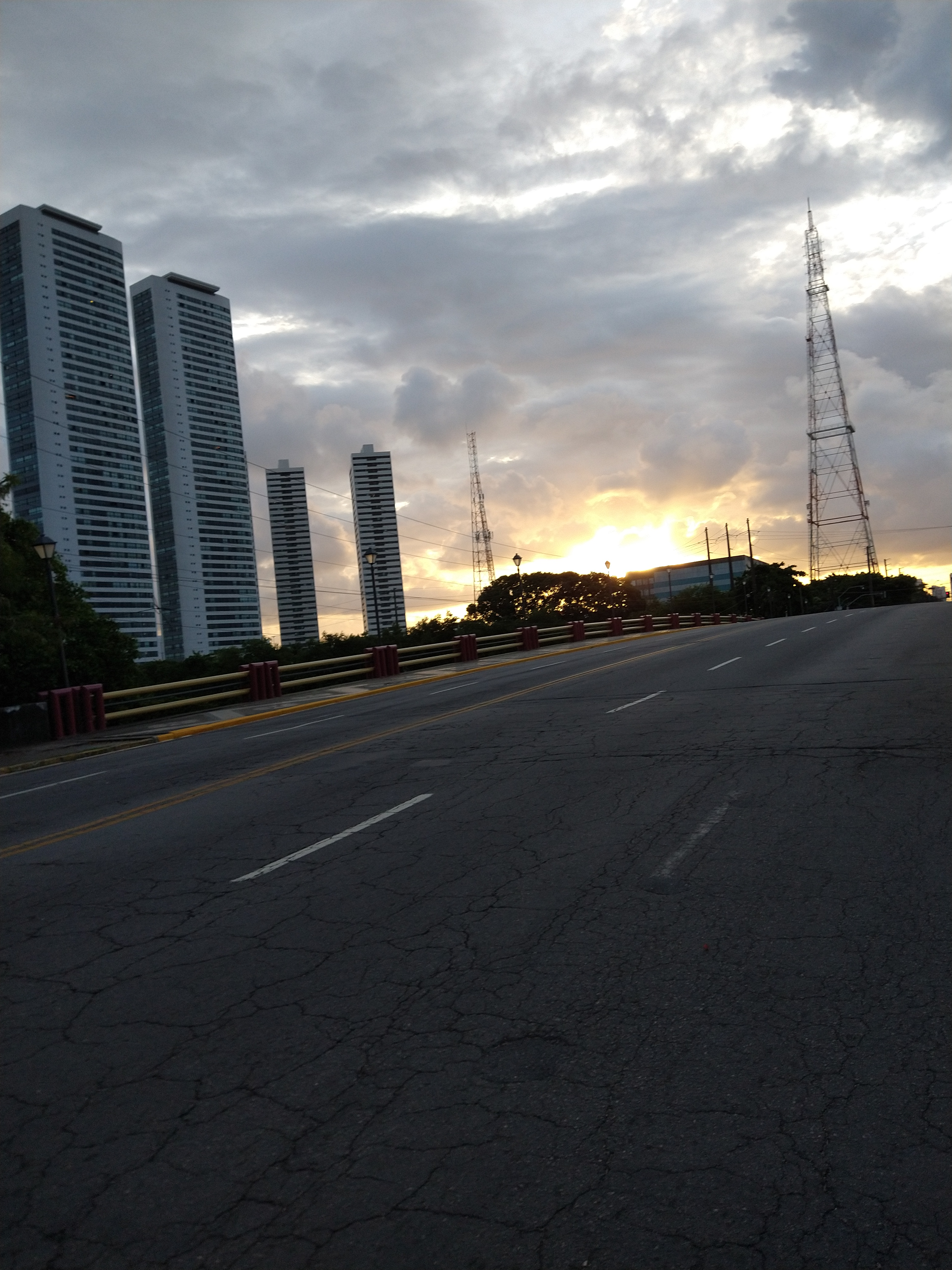
The Limoeiro Bridge was built by the English when they came to occupy the city in the 19th century.

Ponte do Limoeiro (Limoeiro Bridge) is a bridge in the city of Recife, Pernambuco, Brazil. It connects Avenida Norte Miguel de Alencar to the Apolo pier, in the Recife neighborhood. Dating back to 1881, it was built from iron for the passage of trains destined for the city of Limoeiro. It was replaced by a reinforced concrete one on 30 July 1966.
