= Salgadinho, Pernambuco =

City of Salgadinho Brazil

Salgadinho
- Municipality of Pernambuco, Brazil
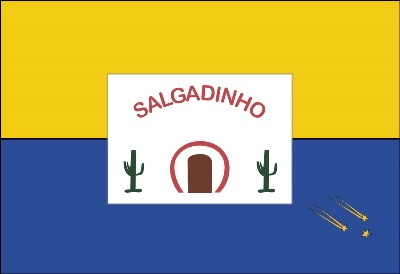
- Flag

- Location of Salgadinho in Pernambuco

- Location within Brazil Location within South America
- Coordinates: 7°56′9″S 35°37′58″W
- Country: Brazil
- Region: Northeast
- State: Pernambuco
- Founded: 20 December 1963

Government
  - Mayor: Jeosadaque Barbosa Salgado (PSDB) (2025-2028)
  - Vice Mayor: Moizeis de Lima Filho (PSDB) (2025-2028)

Area
  - Total: 87.217 km^{2} (33.675 sq mi)
- Elevation: 232 m (761 ft)

Population (2022 Census)
  - Total: 5,727
  - Estimate (2025): 5,478
  - Density: 65.66/km^{2} (170.1/sq mi)
- Demonym: Salgadinense (Brazilian Portuguese)
- Time zone: UTC-03:00 (Brasília Time)
- Postal code: 55675-000
- HDI (2010): 0.534 – low
- Website: salgadinho.pe.gov.br

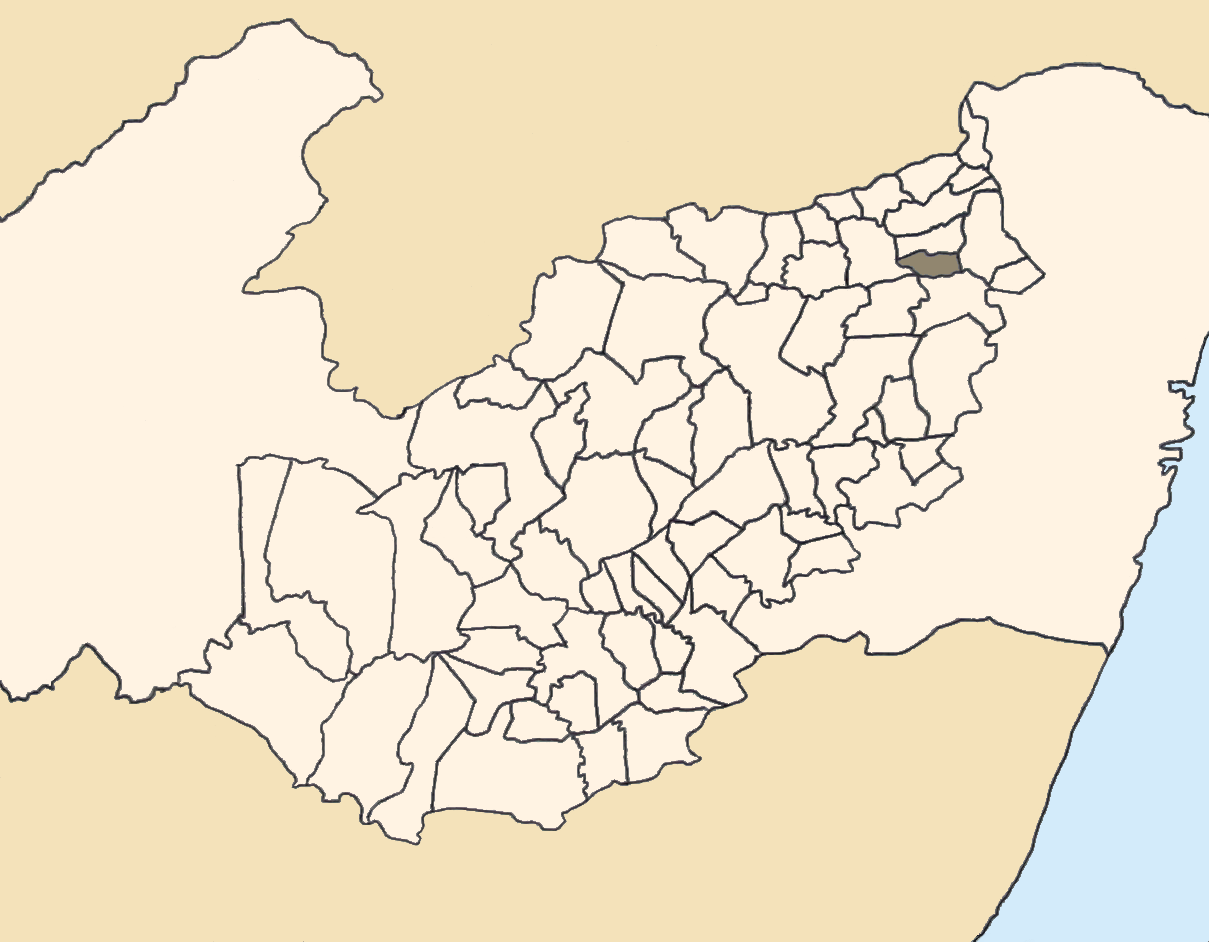
Location of Salgadinho within Pernambuco.

Salgadinho (Central northeastern portuguese pronunciation: [sɐwɡɐˈdĩj̃u]) is a city located in the state of Pernambuco, Brazil. Located at 124.6 km away from Recife, capital of the state of Pernambuco. Has an estimated (IBGE 2020) population of 343,200 inhabitants.

== Geography ==
- State - Pernambuco
- Region - Agreste Pernambucano
- Boundaries - João Alfredo (N); Passira (S); Limoeiro (E); Surubim (W).
- Area - 88.81 km^{2}
- Elevation - 232 m
- Hydrography - Capibaribe River
- Vegetation - Caatinga Hipoxerófila
- Climate - Semi arid hot
- Annual average temperature - 27.0 c
- Distance to Recife - 124.6 km

== Economy ==
The main economic activities in Salgadinho are based in agribusiness, especially livestock such as cattle, goats and poultry.

=== Economic indicators ===
Population	GDP x(1000 R$).	GDP pc (R$)	PE
8.214	19.997	2.574	0.033%

Economy by Sector 2006

Primary sector	Secondary sector	Service sector
5.61%	9.18%	85.21%

=== Health indicators ===
HDI (2000)	Hospitals (2007)	Hospitals beds (2007)	Children's Mortality every 1000 (2005)
0.602	1	5	59

== See also ==
- List of municipalities in Pernambuco
