= Tracunhaém =

Municipality of Pernambuco, Brazil

- Municipality of Pernambuco, Brazil
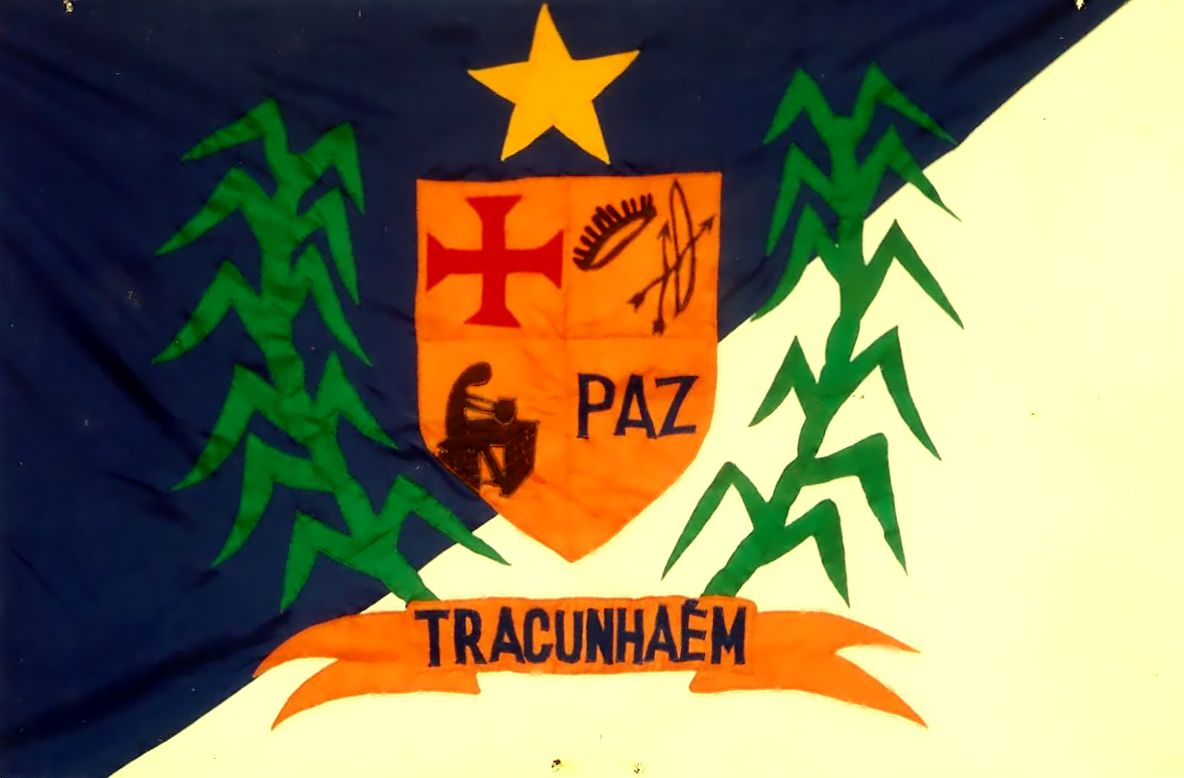
- Flag

- Location of Tracunhaém in Pernambuco

- Location within Brazil Location within South America
- Coordinates: 7°48′18″S 35°14′24″W
- Country: Brazil
- Region: Northeast
- State: Pernambuco
- Founded: 20 December 1963

Government
  - Mayor: Aluizio Xavier da Silva (PSD) (2025-2028)
  - Vice Mayor: Áurea Galdino de Lima (PP) (2025-2028)

Area
  - Total: 137.321 km^{2} (53.020 sq mi)
- Elevation: 120 m (390 ft)

Population (2022 Census)
  - Total: 13,867
  - Estimate (2025): 14,439
  - Density: 100.98/km^{2} (261.5/sq mi)
- Demonym: Tracunhaense (Brazilian Portuguese)
- Time zone: UTC-03:00 (Brasília Time)
- Postal code: 55805-000
- HDI (2010): 0.605 – medium
- Website: tracunhaem.pe.gov.br

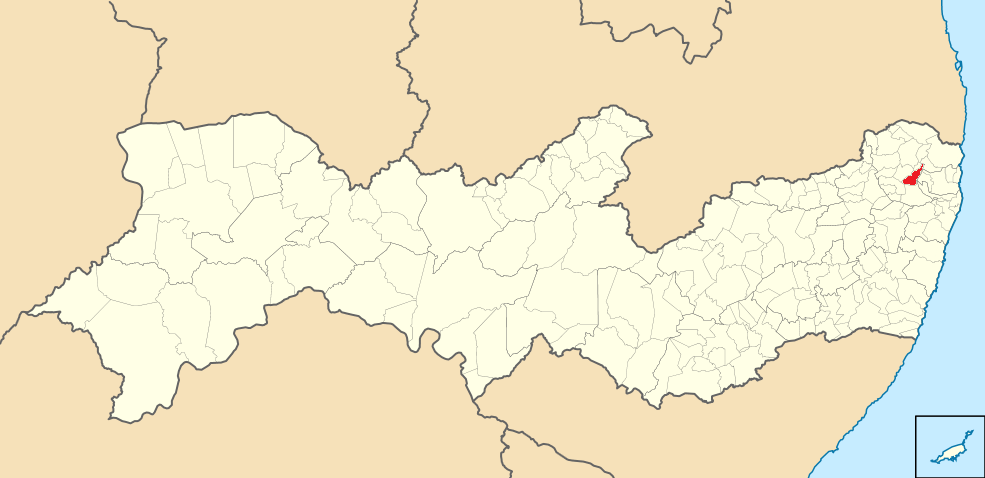

Tracunhaém (Central northeastern portuguese pronunciation: [tɾɐkuɲɐˈẽj̃]) is a city located in the state of Pernambuco, Brazil. Located at 63 km from Recife, capital of the state of Pernambuco. Has an estimated (IBGE 2025) population of 14,439 inhabitants.

== Geography ==
- State - Pernambuco
- Region - Zona da mata Pernambucana
- Boundaries - Nazaré da Mata (N); Paudalho (S); Araçoiaba and Itaquitinga (E); Carpina (W)
- Area - 116.66 km^{2}
- Elevation - 120 m
- Hydrography - Goiana and Capibaribe rivers
- Vegetation - Subcaducifólia forest
- Climate - Hot tropical and humid
- Annual average temperature - 24.9 c
- Distance to Recife - 63 km

== Economy ==
The main economic activities in Tracunhaém are based in commerce and agribusiness, especially sugarcane; and livestock such as poultry, cattle and pigs.

=== Economic indicators ===
Population	GDP x(1000 R$).	GDP pc (R$)	PE
13.265	46.591	3.659	0.08%

Economy by Sector 2006

Primary sector	Secondary sector	Service sector
32.82%	6.87%	60.31%

=== Health indicators ===
HDI (2000)	Hospitals (2007)	Hospitals beds (2007)	Children's Mortality every 1000 (2005)
0.636	1	17	12.8

== See also ==
- List of municipalities in Pernambuco
