= Michelle Melo =

Brazilian singer (born 1980)

- Born: Michelle de Melo Borba; May 1, 1980 (age 46); Recife, Pernambuco, Brazil
- Genres: Regional Brazilian; Forró
- Occupation: Singer

Michelle de Melo Borba (born May 1, 1980), better known by her stage name Michelle Melo, is a Brazilian singer of brega music from the state of Pernambuco. She achieved local celebrity status when she was the lead singer of Banda Metade in the early 2000s, when she performed songs with sensual themes, marked by whispers and moans. Lua de Mel, Baby Doll and Lipstick are some of her main hits.

Melo was one of the first female vocalists of brega music to be successful in Pernambuco. Due to her pioneering spirit, sensual music, daring performances and blonde hair, the Recife native came to be known as Madonna do Brega or Madonna de Pernambuco. It also received the nickname Rainha do Brega, given by fellow countryman Reginaldo Rossi, widely known as Rei do Brega. Currently, the singer is one of the voices that defends brega music as a cultural heritage of the state of Pernambuco.

== Biography ==
Born on the outskirts of Recife, Michelle Melo began her professional career in the music industry at the age of 14, when she began singing in bars and in wedding orchestras. The Pernambuco native even traveled to Fortaleza to be the lead singer of a forró band. Upon returning to Recife, she received an invitation to be the lead singer of a brega band called Cabaré. In 2001, came the invitation to Banda Metade, which had already been standing out in the brega music scene in Pernambuco with the album Vem Me Completar.

His debut in Banda Metade was with Lua de Mel, a composition by Walter de Afogados with a strong sensual content. The track became a hit on the streets of Recife in just one week. Michelle began appearing on local television programs, especially Tribuna Show, on TV Tribuna do Recife, where she debuted as the group's lead singer. Its success stimulated a greater presence of women in the vocals of the cheesy bands of the state, in addition to increasingly sensual lyrics.

At Half, she also released Baby Doll, Ecstasy, Seven Days of Love and Topo do Prazer. In 2005, the singer decided to pursue a solo career due to conflicts of interest with Banda Metade. She was replaced by Dany (nickname of Ivanira Melo de Souza), who ended up dying with businessman Usiel Barbosa Lima after an accident with the band's bus in the municipality of Machados, in the interior of Pernambuco. Thus, Priscila Araújo took over the vocals.

In 2006, Michelle Melo appeared on national television during the program Central da Periferia, on Rede Globo Pernambuco, presented by Regina Casé and recorded in Morro da Conceição, in the North Zone of Recife. The exhibition earned her wide visibility and invitations, including a concert in Portugal. In 2008, she appeared again on national network on TV Xuxa, presented by Xuxa Meneghel on TV Globo. In the context, the program had a frame called Brega é Chique, which held a contest with several bands of the genre from the Northeast and North.

Michelle returned to Banda Metade in 2010, accounting for more than five CDs recorded with the group, in addition to a DVD released in 2011. She left the band again in 2015, stating that she wanted to "go back to being authentic on stage".

In the 2010s, the singer appears frequently in the traditional press as she consolidates herself as a defender of cheesy culture. She was one of the voices that echoed Bill 1176/2017, authored by state deputy Edilson Silva (PSOL), approved by the Legislative Assembly of Pernambuco (ALEPE) in 2017 to include the Brega rhythm in the list of cultural expressions in Pernambuco. At the time, she even cried and said that the brega was marginalized and ridiculed. She claimed to have been targeted by intellectuals when she defended brega as a culture and, therefore, ended up staying out of the state's carnival festivities.

In the same decade, brega began to have an increasingly national repercussion through digital culture, in addition to being the subject of discussions in the press and in universities.

== Discography ==
With Banda Metade

- Volume 2
- Ao Vivo
- Grandes Sucessos – Volume 11
- Ao Vivo
- Ao Vivo no Clube Português do Recife
- Ao Vivo
- Ao Vivo No Brega Naite

Solo

- Michelle Melo – Uma Explosão de Sensualidade
- Ao Vivo
