= Vitória de Santo Antão =

Municipality of Pernambuco, Brazil

Vitória de Santo Antão Municipality of Pernambuco
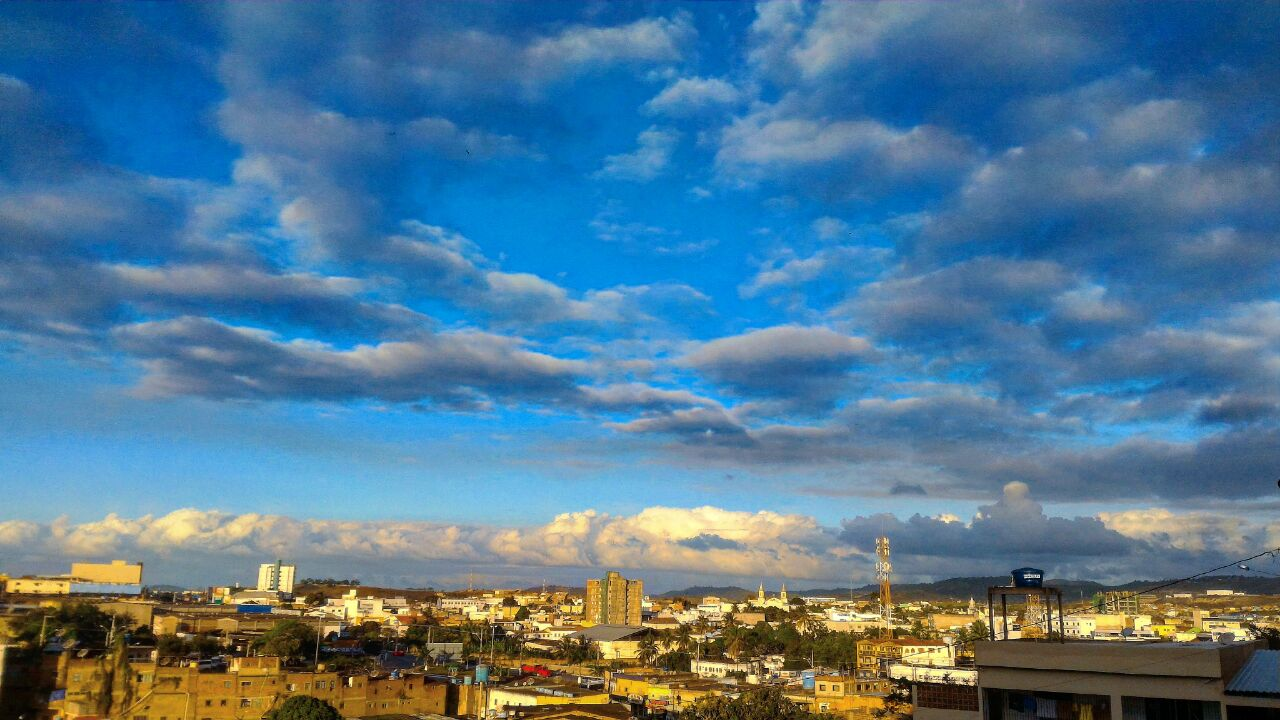

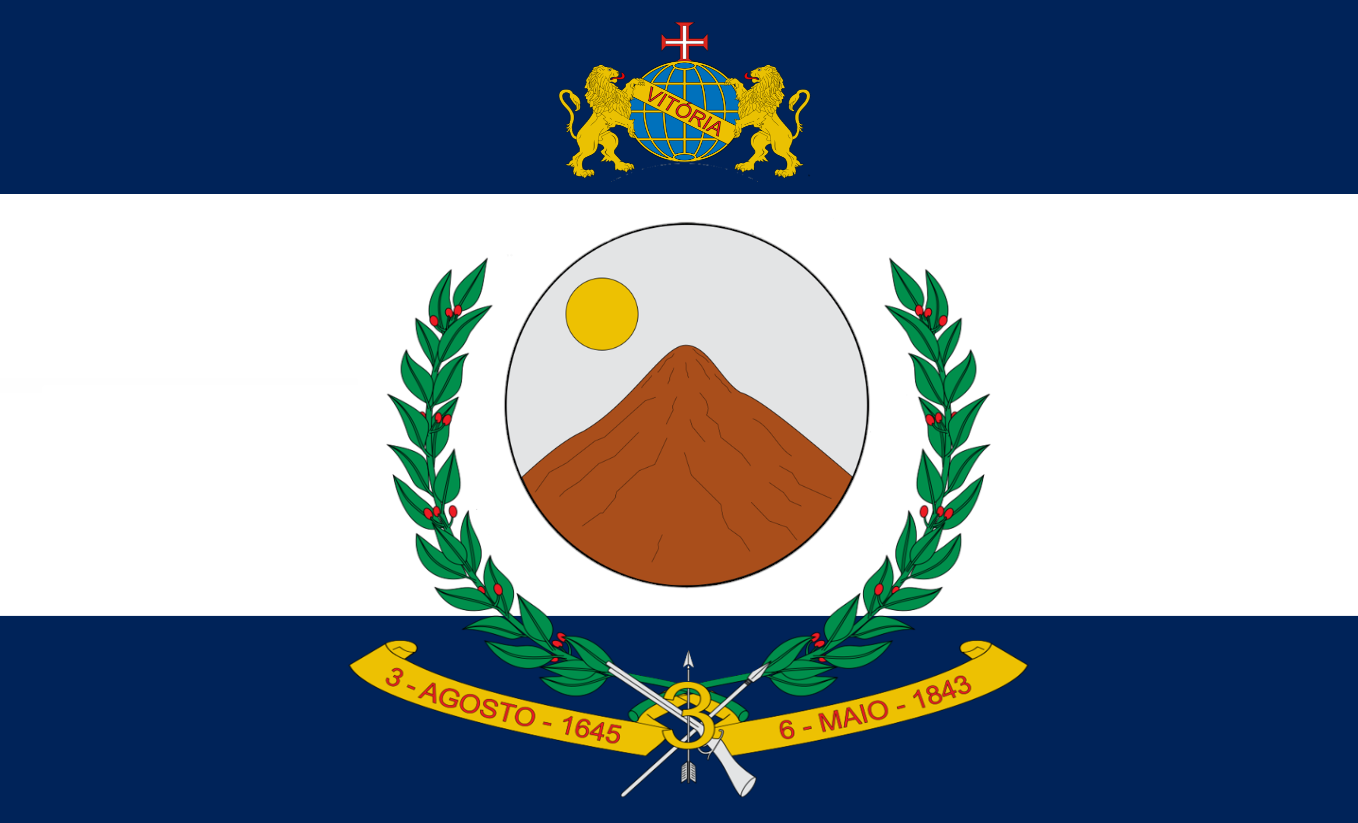
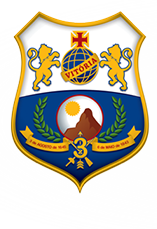
- Flag Coat of arms
- Nickname: "Victory" "City of Braga" "Capital of the Zone da Mata" "Pitú Land "
- Motto: Victory
- Location in the state of Pernambuco and Brazil

- Location in Brazil
- Coordinates: 08°07′35″S 35°18′27″W
- Country: Brazil
- Region: Northeast Region
- State: Pernambuco
- Established: 1626

Government
  - Mayor: Paulo Roberto(MDB)

Area
  - Total: 335.941 km^{2} (129.708 sq mi)
- Elevation: 165 m (541 ft)

Population (2022 Census)
  - Total: 134,084
  - Estimate (2025): 144,243
  - Density: 399.130/km^{2} (1,033.74/sq mi)
- Time zone: UTC−3 (BRT)
- Postal code: 55600-000

Vitória de Santo Antão (Central northeastern portuguese pronunciation: [viˈtɔɾjɐ di ˈsɐ̃tŭ ɐ̃ˈtɐ̃w]) is a city in Pernambuco State, Brazil, 46 kilometers west of Recife. Its territorial area is 335,942 km², 5,717 km² of which lies within the urban perimeter. In 2021, the Brazilian Institute of Geography and Statistics (IBGE) estimated its population at approximately 140,389 inhabitants, being the tenth most populous city in Pernambuco, the fourth most populous in the interior of the state and the most populous in Zona da Mata. According to the Firjan Municipal Development Index (IFDM), Vitória de Santo Antão was elected the 8th best city of Pernambuco to live in.

== Synopsis ==
Its predominant native vegetation is Atlantic forest, although much of its green landscape has been replaced by sugarcane monoculture. With approximately 87.2% of the population living in the urban area of the municipality, the city had 57 health facilities in 2009. Its Human Development Index is 0.640 and is considered medium.(8°07′S 35°18′W).

It was founded by a Portuguese man from Cape Verde named António Diogo de Braga in 1626. In 1774 it became a village with 4,000 inhabitants. In 1811 it was promoted into a city by royal decree of Dom João IV.

== Geography ==
- State - Pernambuco
- Region - Zona da mata Pernambucana(-2018)
- Intermediate Geographic Region of Recife.(2018–Present)
- Boundaries - Glória do Goitá and Chã de Alegria (N); Primavera and Escada (S); Pombos (W); Moreno, Cabo de Santo Agostinho and São Lourenço da Mata (E)
- Area - 371.8 km^{2}
- Elevation - 156 m
- Hydrography - Capibaribe, Ipojuca and Tapacurá
- Vegetation - Subperenifólia forest
- Climate - Hot tropical and humid
- Annual average temperature - 23.4 c
- Distance to Recife - 45 km

=== Climate ===
With a hot and humid climate, the city is concentrated on the Borborema plateau, in the mountainous region of Pernambuco.

The average temperature is 23.8 °C. It has rainy and mild winters with temperatures between 13 °C and 18 °C. In summer the highs are up to 32° in regions west of the city.

== Economy ==
The main economic activities in Vitoria de Santo Antão are based in commerce, food and beverage industry (including the traditional Pitú cachaça), and primary sector especially sugarcane, lemons and cattle.

It has the 8th largest economy in Pernambuco, has an industrial pole with some of the largest companies in the world. There is also Victory Park Shopping, the shopping mall in the region.

The city also has a tradition in agriculture.

=== Economic Indicators ===
Population	GDP x(1000 R$).	GDP pc (R$)	PE
126.399	745.504	6.149	1.22%

Economy by Sector 2006

Primary sector	Secondary sector	Service sector
4.91%	27.64%	67.45%

=== Health Indicators ===
HDI (2000)	Hospitals (2007)	Hospitals beds (2007)	Children's Mortality every 1000 (2005)
0.663	5	494	15.6

== Notable people ==
- Odoguiinha (born 2005), model and actor

== See also ==
- List of municipalities in Pernambuco
