= Streptomyces carpinensis =

Scientific classification
- Domain: Bacteria
- Kingdom: Bacillati
- Phylum: Actinomycetota
- Class: Actinomycetia
- Order: Streptomycetales
- Family: Streptomycetaceae
- Genus: Streptomyces
- Species: S. carpinensis

Binomial name
- Streptomyces carpinensis (Falcão de Morais et al. 1971) Goodfellow et al. 1986

Type strain
- 70-6-2, ATCC 27116, BCRC 16854, Brazil), CCRC 16854, CGMCC 4.1947, CVB 619, DSM 43835, IFO 14214, IMET 43558, JCM 3301, KCC 3301, KCC A-0301, KCC S-0301, KCTC 9128, NBRC 14214, NRRL B-16921, Recife, RIA 982, VKM Ac-1300, VKM Ac-657

Synonyms
- Elytrosporangium carpinense Falcão de Morais et al. 1971 (Approved Lists 1980)

Species of bacterium

Streptomyces carpinensis is a bacterium species from the genus of Streptomyces which has been isolated from soil from Carpina in Pernambuco in Brazil.

== See also ==
- List of Streptomyces species
