= Paudalho =

Municipality of Pernambuco, Brazil

- Municipality
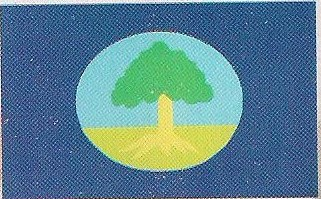
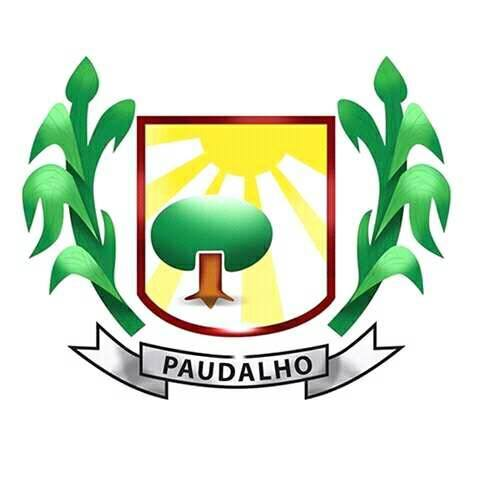
- Flag Coat of arms

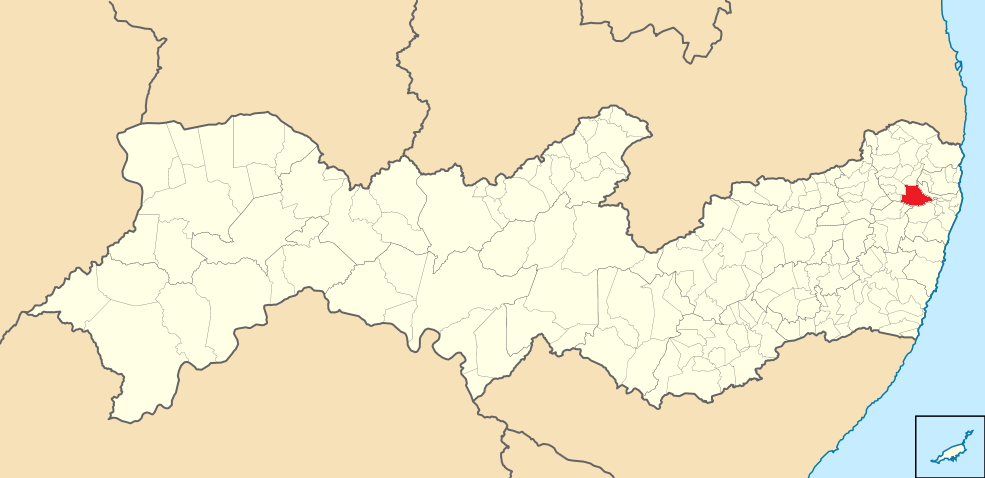
- Location in Pernambuco state

- Location in Brazil
- Coordinates: 7°53′49″S 35°10′48″W
- Country: Brazil
- Region: Northeast
- State: Pernambuco
- Mesoregion: Zona da Mata
- Microregion: Mata Setentrional Pernambucana
- Founded: 4 February 1811

Government
  - Mayor: Marcello Fuchs Campos Gouveia Filho (PSD)

Area
  - Total: 277.796 km^{2} (107.258 sq mi)
- Elevation: 69 m (226 ft)

Population (2022 Census)
  - Total: 56,665
  - Estimate (2025): 59,924
  - Density: 203.98/km^{2} (528.31/sq mi)
- Demonym: paudalhense
- Time zone: UTC−3 (BRT)
- Postal code: 55825-000
- Area code: 87
- Website: paudalho.pe.gov.br

Paudalho (Central northeastern portuguese pronunciation: [pɐwˈdɐʎŭ]) is a city in northeastern Brazil, in the State of Pernambuco.

== Geography ==
- Region - Zona da mata Pernambucana
- Boundaries - Tracunhaém (N), São Lourenço da Mata, Chã de Alegria, Camaragibe and Glória do Goitá (S), Carpina and Lagoa do Itaenga (W), Paulista and Abreu e Lima (E)
- Hydrography - Capibaribe and Goiana rivers
- Vegetation - Subcaducifólia forest
- Climate - Hot tropical and humid
- Annual average temperature - 25.2 °C (77.4 °F)
- Distance to Recife - 42 kilometres (26 mi)

== Economy ==
The main economic activities in Paudalho are based in extractive industry, commerce and primary sector especially sugarcane and cattle.

=== Economic indicators ===
Population	GDP x(1000 R$).	GDP pc (R$)	PE
47.551	177.556	3.879	0.29%

Economy by Sector 2006

Primary sector	Secondary sector	Service sector
14.24%	16.67%	69.09%

=== Health Indicators ===
HDI (2000)	Hospitals (2007)	Hospitals beds (2007)	Children's Mortality every 1000 (2005)
0.67	2	114	17.3

== See also ==
- List of municipalities in Pernambuco
