= Passira =

Municipality of Pernambuco, Brazil

- Municipality of Pernambuco, Brazil
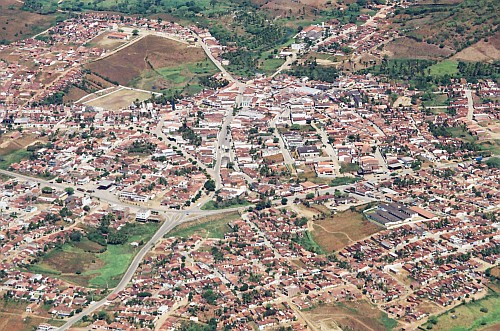
- Aerial view of Passira

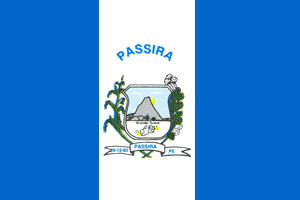
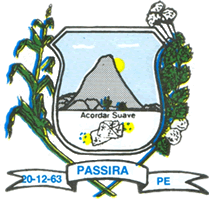
- Flag Coat of arms
- Etymology: Named after a mountain range near the municipality whose name was derived from the Tupi language meaning "ending in an arrowhead"
- Location of Passira in Pernambuco

- Location within Brazil Location within South America
- Coordinates: 7°58′30″S 35°34′51″W
- Country: Brazil
- Region: Northeast
- State: Pernambuco
- Founded: 20 December 1963

Government
  - Mayor: Severino Silvestre de Albuquerque (PSD) (2025-2028)
  - Vice Mayor: Ernande Francisco da Silva Filho (PSB) (2025-2028)

Area
  - Total: 327.210 km^{2} (126.336 sq mi)
- Elevation: 176 m (577 ft)

Population (2022 Census)
  - Total: 28,340
  - Estimate (2025): 29,744
  - Density: 86.61/km^{2} (224.3/sq mi)
- Demonym: Passirense (Brazilian Portuguese)
- Time zone: UTC-03:00 (Brasília Time)
- Postal code: 55650-000, 55652-000
- HDI (2010): 0.592 – medium
- Website: passira.pe.gov.br

Passira (Central northeastern portuguese pronunciation: [pɐˈsiɾɐ]) is a municipality in the state of Pernambuco, Brazil.

== Geography ==
- Region - Agreste Pernambucano
- Boundaries - Limoeiro and Salgadinho (N); Gravatá, Bezerros and Pombos (S); Cumaru (W); Feira Nova and Glória do Goitá (E)
- Area - 329.75 km^{2}
- Elevation - 176 m
- Hydrography - Capibaribe river
- Vegetation - Caatinga hipoxerófila
- Climate - semi arid hot
- Average annual temperature - 24.1 °C
- Distance to Recife - 115 km
- Population - 28,894 (2020)

== Economy ==
The main economic activities in Passira are based in commerce and agribusiness, especially tomatoes, corn and beans, and the rearing of cattle, goats, sheep and horses.

=== Economic Indicators ===
Population	GDP x(1000 R$).	GDP pc (R$)	PE
28.518	80.369	2.880	0.135%

Economy by Sector 2006

Primary sector	Secondary sector	Service sector
11.04%	8.80%	80.16%

=== Health Indicators ===
HDI (2000)	Hospitals (2007)	Hospitals beds (2007)	Children's Mortality every 1000 (2005)
0.625	1	30	21

== See also ==
- List of municipalities in Pernambuco
