= João Alfredo =

City in Pernambuco, Brazil

- Municipality of Pernambuco, Brazil
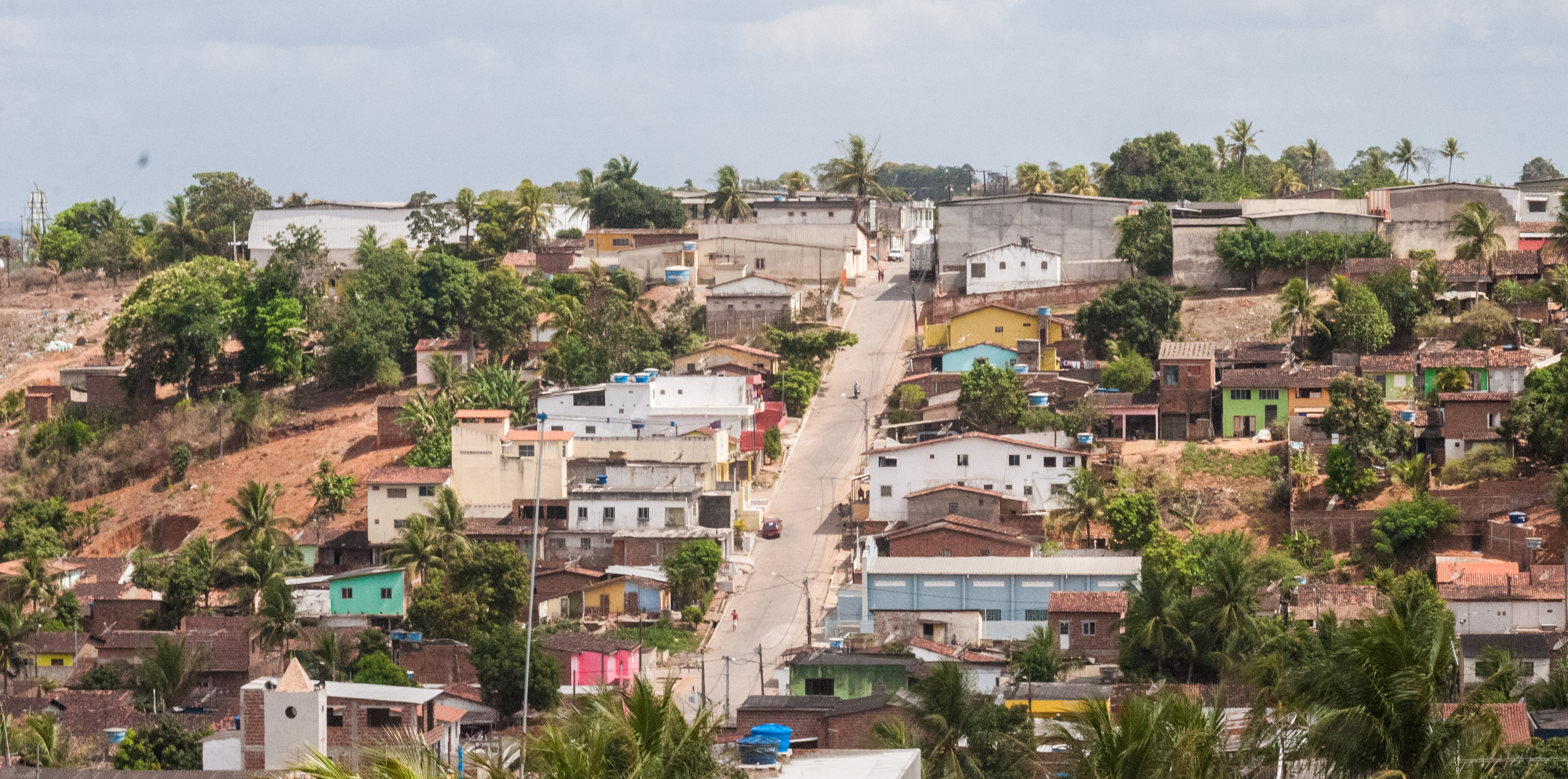
- View of João Alfredo

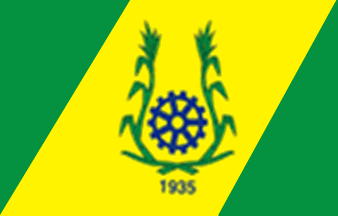
- Flag

- Location of João Alfredo in Pernambuco

- Location within Brazil Location within South America
- Coordinates: 7°51′21″S 35°35′16″W
- Country: Brazil
- Region: Northeast
- State: Pernambuco
- Founded: 10 October 1935

Government
  - Mayor: José Antonio Martins da Silva (PSB) (2025-2028)
  - Vice Mayor: Adeildo Batista de Oliveira Filho (Avante) (2025-2028)

Area
  - Total: 134.147 km^{2} (51.794 sq mi)
- Elevation: 328 m (1,076 ft)

Population (2022 Census)
  - Total: 27,725
  - Estimate (2025): 28,842
  - Density: 206.68/km^{2} (535.3/sq mi)
- Demonym: Alfredense (Brazilian Portuguese)
- Time zone: UTC-03:00 (Brasília Time)
- Postal code: 55720-000
- HDI (2010): 0.576 – medium
- Website: joaoalfredo.pe.gov.br

João Alfredo (Central northeastern portuguese pronunciation: [ˈʒuɐ̃w ɐwˈfɾedu]) is a city located in the state of Pernambuco, Brazil. Located at 120.6 km away from Recife, capital of the state of Pernambuco. Has an estimated (IBGE 2020) population of 33,328 inhabitants.

== Geography ==
- State - Pernambuco
- Region - Agreste Pernambucano
- Boundaries - Bom Jardim (N); Salgadinho (S); Limoeiro (E); Surubim (W).
- Area - 133.52 km^{2}
- Elevation - 328 m
- Hydrography - Goiana and Capibaribe rivers
- Vegetation - Caatinga Hipoxerófila
- Climate - Tropical hot and humid
- Annual average temperature - 23.9 c
- Distance to Recife - 120.6 km

== Economy ==
The main economic activities in João Alfredo are based in wood & furniture industry, commerce and agribusiness, especially sugarcane, corn, manioc; and livestock such as cattle, sheep, goats, pigs and poultry.

=== Economic indicators ===
Population	GDP x(1000 R$).	GDP pc (R$)	PE
29.875	89.361	3.137	0.15%

Economy by Sector 2006

Primary sector	Secondary sector	Service sector
11.60%	10.90%	77.50%

=== Health indicators ===
HDI (2000)	Hospitals (2007)	Hospitals beds (2007)	Children's Mortality every 1000 (2005)
0.610	1	27	23.5

== See also ==
- List of municipalities in Pernambuco
