= Chã de Alegria =

Municipality of Pernambuco, Brazil

- Municipality
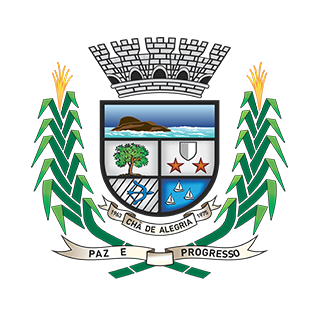
- Coat of arms

- Location in Brazil
- Coordinates: 8°0′3″S 35°12′48″W
- Country: Brazil
- Region: Northeast
- State: Pernambuco

Population (2022 Census)
  - Total: 12,984
  - Estimate (2025): 13,496
- Time zone: UTC−3 (BRT)

Chã de Alegria (Central northeastern portuguese pronunciation: [ʃɐ̃ di ɐliˈɡɾiɐ]) is a city located in the state of Pernambuco, Brazil. Located at 54 km away from Recife, capital of the state of Pernambuco. Has an estimated (IBGE 2025) population of 13,496 inhabitants.

== Geography ==
- State - Pernambuco
- Region - Zona da mata Pernambucana
- Boundaries - Paudalho (N); Vitória de Santo Antão (S); São Lourenço da Mata (E); Glória do Goitá (W)
- Area - 48.45 km^{2}
- Elevation - 160 m
- Hydrography - Capibaribe River
- Vegetation - Caducifólia forest
- Climate - Hot tropical and humid
- Annual average temperature - 25.0 c
- Distance to Recife - 54 km

== Economy ==
The main economic activities in Chã de Alegria are based in agribusiness, especially sugarcane, coconuts; and livestock such as cattle and poultry.

=== Economic indicators ===
Population	GDP x(1000 R$).	GDP pc (R$)	PE
12.185	34.436	2.959	0.06%

Economy by Sector 2006

Primary sector	Secondary sector	Service sector
15.18%	8.43%	76.39%

=== Health indicators ===
HDI (2000)	Hospitals (2007)	Hospitals beds (2007)	Children's Mortality every 1000 (2005)
0.629	1	19	5.2

== See also ==
- List of municipalities in Pernambuco
