= Lagoa do Carro =

Municipality of Pernambuco, Brazil

- City
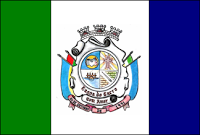
- Flag

- Lagoa do Carro located in Brazil Map
- Coordinates: 07°50′42″S 35°19′12″W
- Country: Brazil
- State: Pernambuco
- Region: Zona da mata

Area
  - Total: 68.87 km^{2} (26.59 sq mi)
- Elevation: 128 m (420 ft)

Population (2022 Census)
  - Total: 17,981
  - Estimate (2025): 18,804
- Time zone: UTC−3 (BRT)

Lagoa do Carro (Central northeastern portuguese pronunciation: [lɐˈɡoɐ du ˈkɐhŭ]) is a city in Pernambuco, Brazil. It is located in Zona da mata Pernambucana region at 60 km of the state capital Recife.

== Geography ==
- State - Pernambuco
- Region - Zona da mata Pernambucana
- Boundaries - Carpina (N and E); Lagoa do Itaenga (S); Limoeiro (W)
- Area - 68.87 km^{2}
- Elevation - 128 m
- Hydrography - Capibaribe and Goiana Rivers
- Vegetation - Subcaducifólia forest
- Climate - Hot tropical and humid
- Distance to Recife - 60 km

== Economy ==
The main economic activities in Lagoa do Carro are based in industry and agribusiness; especially cattle, goats, pigs and chickens.

=== Economic Indicators ===
Population	GDP x(1000 R$).	GDP pc (R$)	PE
18,804	48.376	3.364	0.08%

Economy by Sector (2006)

Primary sector	Secondary sector	Service sector
18.63%	8.26%	73.11%

=== Health Indicators ===
HDI (2000)	Hospitals (2007)	Hospitals beds (2007)	Children's Mortality every 1000 (2005)
0.654	1	13	20.2

== See also ==
- List of municipalities in Pernambuco
