= Feira Nova, Pernambuco =

Municipality of Pernambuco, Brazil

Feira Nova
- City
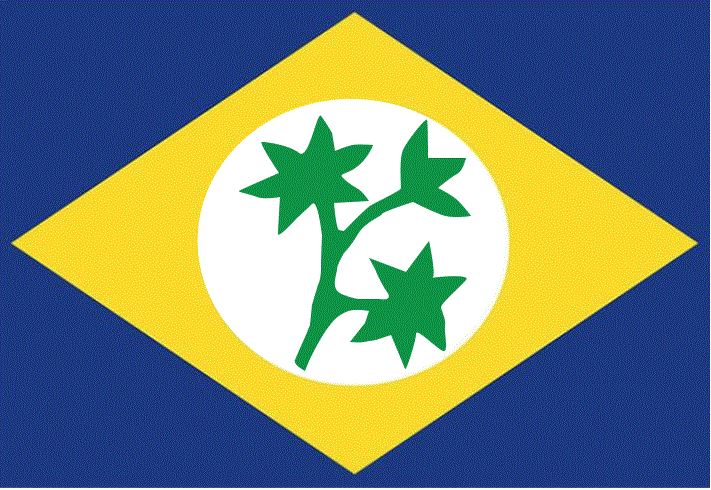
- Flag

- Feira Nova located in Brazil Map
- Coordinates: 7°57′03″S 35°23′20″W
- Country: Brazil
- State: Pernambuco
- Region: Agreste

Area
  - City: 107.75 km^{2} (41.60 sq mi)
- Elevation: 154 m (505 ft)

Population (2022 Census)
  - City: 21,427
  - Estimate (2025): 22,222
  - Urban: 2,025
- Time zone: UTC−3 (BRT)

Feira Nova (Central northeastern portuguese pronunciation: [ˈfeɾɐ ˈnɔvɐ]) is a city in northeastern Brazil, in the State of Pernambuco. According with IBGE, has an estimated population of 21,427 inhabitants (2022 Census).

== Geography ==
- State - Pernambuco
- Region - Agreste Pernambucano
- Boundaries - Limoeiro (N); Glória do Goitá (S); Passira (W); Lagoa do Itaenga (E)
- Area - 107.75 km^{2}
- Elevation - 154 m
- Hydrography - Capibaribe river
- Vegetation - Caducifólia forest
- Climate - tropical hot and humid
- Distance to Recife - 78 km

== Economy ==
The main economic activities in Feira Nova are based in agribusiness, especially manioc, sugarcane and cattle and their milk.

=== Economic Indicators ===
Population	GDP x(1000 R$).	GDP pc (R$)	PE
20.052	53.257	2.763	0.09%

Economy by Sector 2006

Primary sector	Secondary sector	Service sector
7.19%	10.66%	82.15%

=== Health Indicators ===
HDI (2000)	Hospitals (2007)	Hospitals beds (2007)	Children's Mortality every 1000 (2005)
0.606	1	27	19.2

== See also ==
- List of municipalities in Pernambuco
