= Buenos Aires, Pernambuco =

Municipality of Pernambuco, Brazil

- Flag Coat of arms

- Location in Pernambuco

- Location in Brazil
- Coordinates: 7°43′33″S 35°19′37″W
- Country: Brazil
- Region: Northeast
- State: Pernambuco

Area
  - Total: 96.69 km^{2} (37.33 sq mi)
- Elevation: 149 m (489 ft)

Population (2022 Census)
  - Total: 12,808
  - Estimate (2025): 13,276
  - Density: 132.5/km^{2} (343.1/sq mi)
- Demonym: buenairense
- Time zone: UTC−3 (BRT)

Buenos Aires (Central northeastern portuguese pronunciation: [buˈẽnus ˈɐjɾis]) is a city located in the state of Pernambuco, Brazil. Located 78 km from the state capital of Recife, it has an estimated (IBGE 2025) population of 13,276 people.

== Geography ==
- State - Pernambuco
- Region - Zona da mata Pernambucana (Coastal zone)
- Boundaries - Vicência (N); Carpina (S); Limoeiro (W); Nazaré da Mata (E)
- Area - 96.69 km^{2}
- Elevation - 149 m
- Drainage basin - Goiana River
- Vegetation - Subcaducifólia forest
- Climate - Hot tropical and humid
- Annual average temperature - 23.1 °C
- Distance to Recife - 78 km

== Economy ==
The main economic activities in Buenos Aires are based in industry, commerce and agribusiness, especially sugarcane, bananas; and livestock such as poultry and cattle.

=== Economic indicators ===
Population (2010)	GDP in thousands of Reais (R$) (2013)	GDP per capita (R$) (2013)	Percent of Pernambuco GDP (2013)
12,537	69,738	5,392	0.06%

Economy by Sector (as of 2013)

Primary sector	Secondary sector	Service sector
12.54%	5.51%	81.94%

=== Health indicators ===
HDI (2010)	Hospitals (2015)	Hospital beds (2015)	Infant mortality rate per 1000 live births (2013)
0.593 (low)	1	17	10.58

== See also ==
- List of municipalities in Pernambuco
