= Vicência =

City in Pernambuco, Brazil

- Municipality of Pernambuco, Brazil
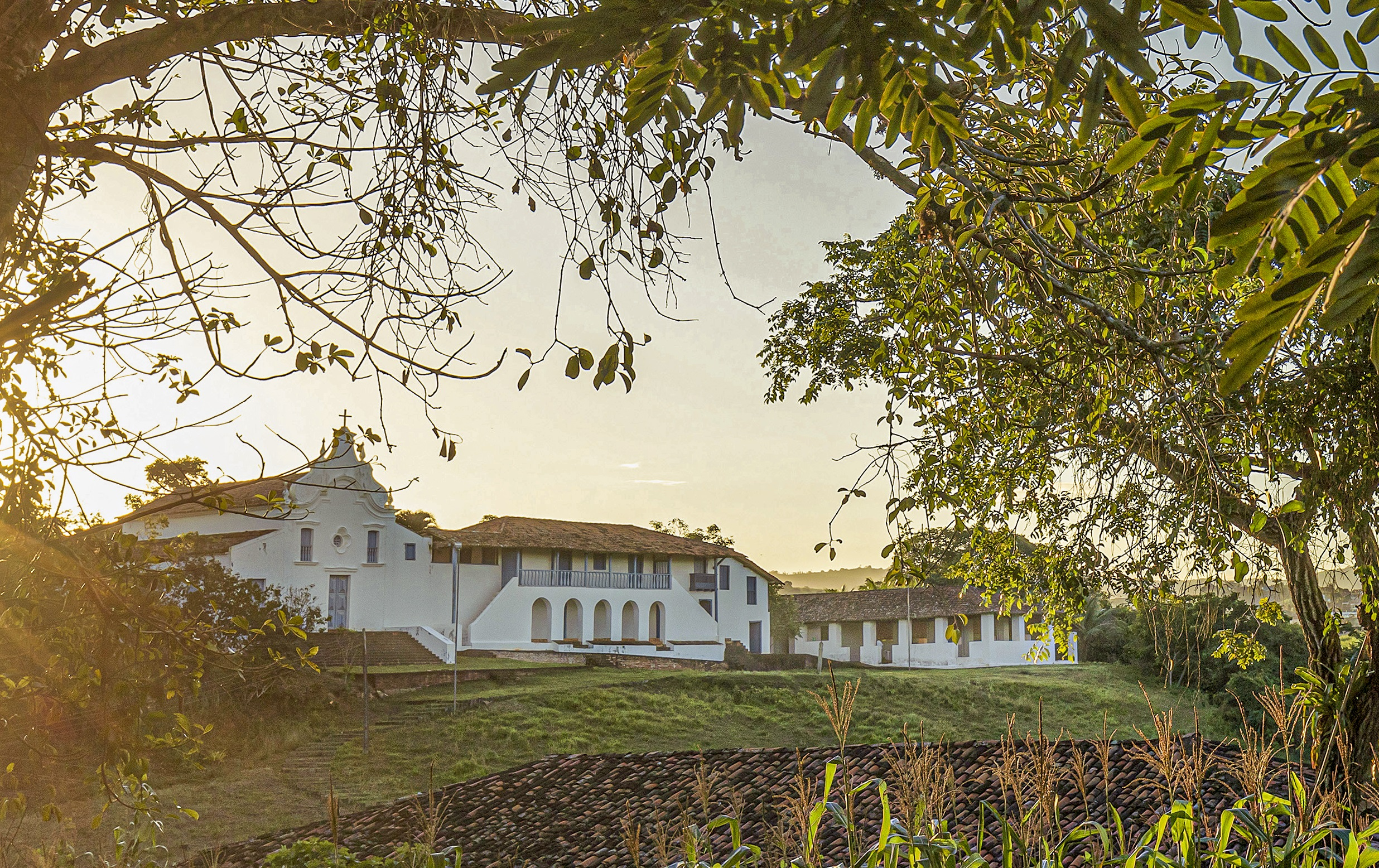
- Poço Comprido Mill in Vicência

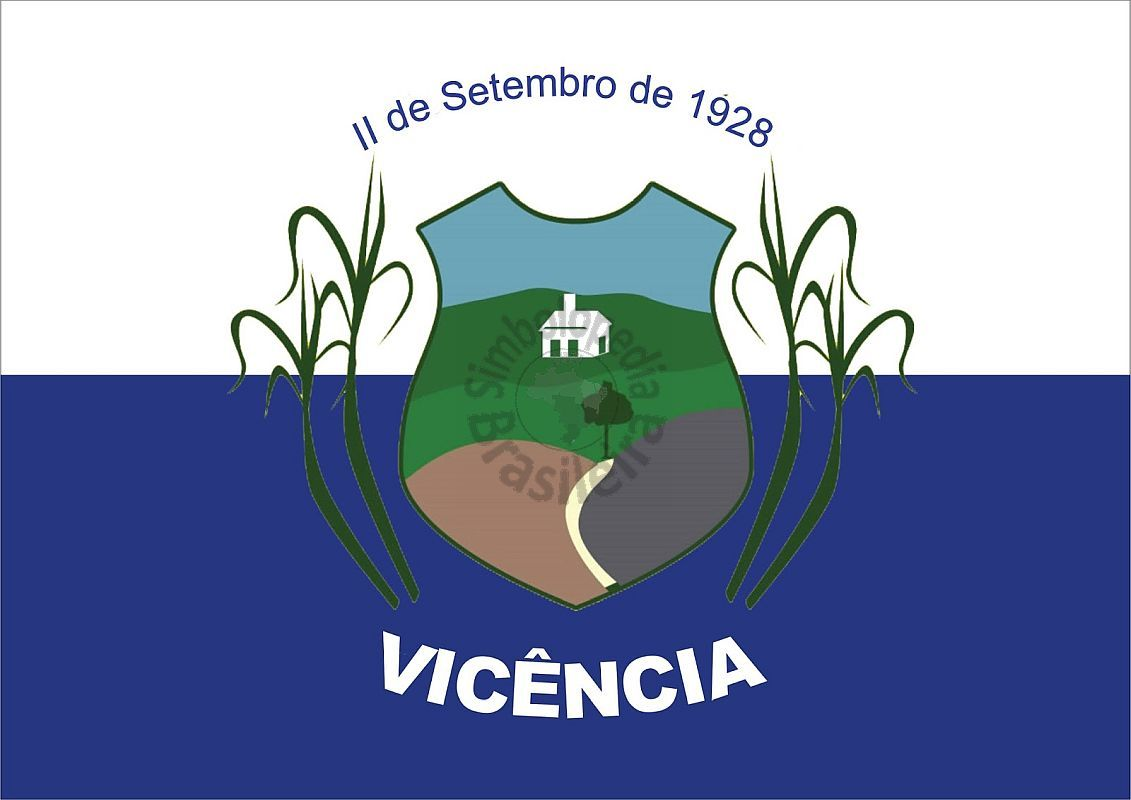
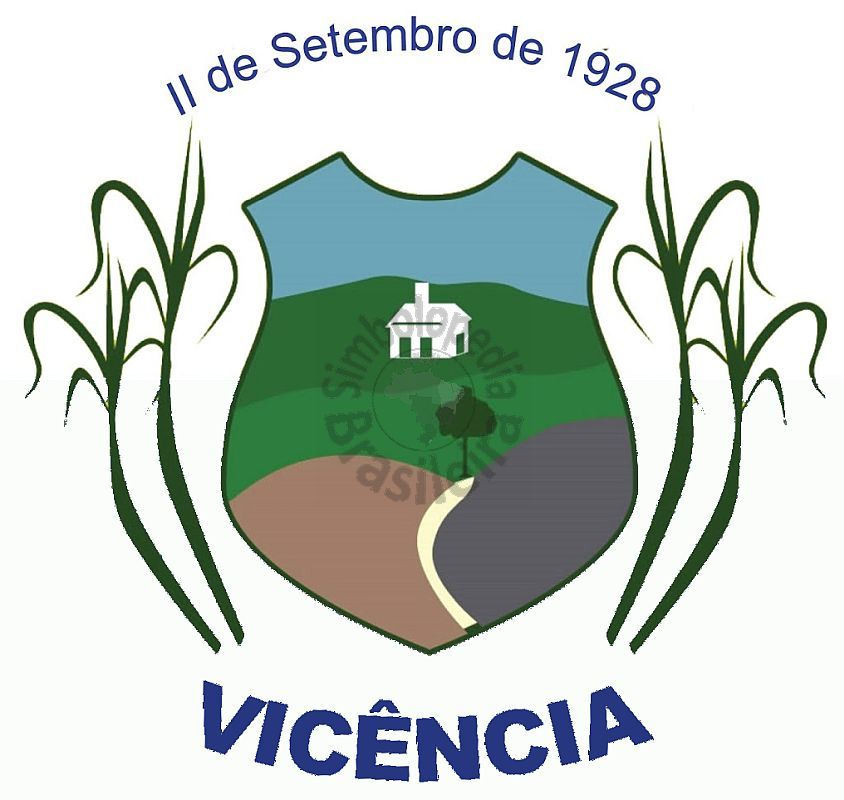
- Flag Coat of arms

- Location of Vicência in Pernambuco

- Location within Brazil Location within South America
- Coordinates: 7°39′25″S 35°19′37″W
- Country: Brazil
- Region: Northeast
- State: Pernambuco
- Founded: 11 September 1928

Government
  - Mayor: Eder Waltter José de Oliveira Silva (PSDB) (2025-2028)
  - Vice Mayor: Duílio Dionísio Donato (PSDB) (2025-2028)

Area
  - Total: 227.906 km^{2} (87.995 sq mi)
- Elevation: 119 m (390 ft)

Population (2025)
  - Total: 27,151
  - Density: 115.6/km^{2} (299/sq mi)
  - Town/Settlement: 12,642
- Demonym: Vicenciense (Brazilian Portuguese)
- Time zone: UTC-03:00 (Brasília Time)
- Postal code: 55850-000, 55855-000
- HDI (2010): 0.605 – medium
- Website: vicencia.pe.gov.br

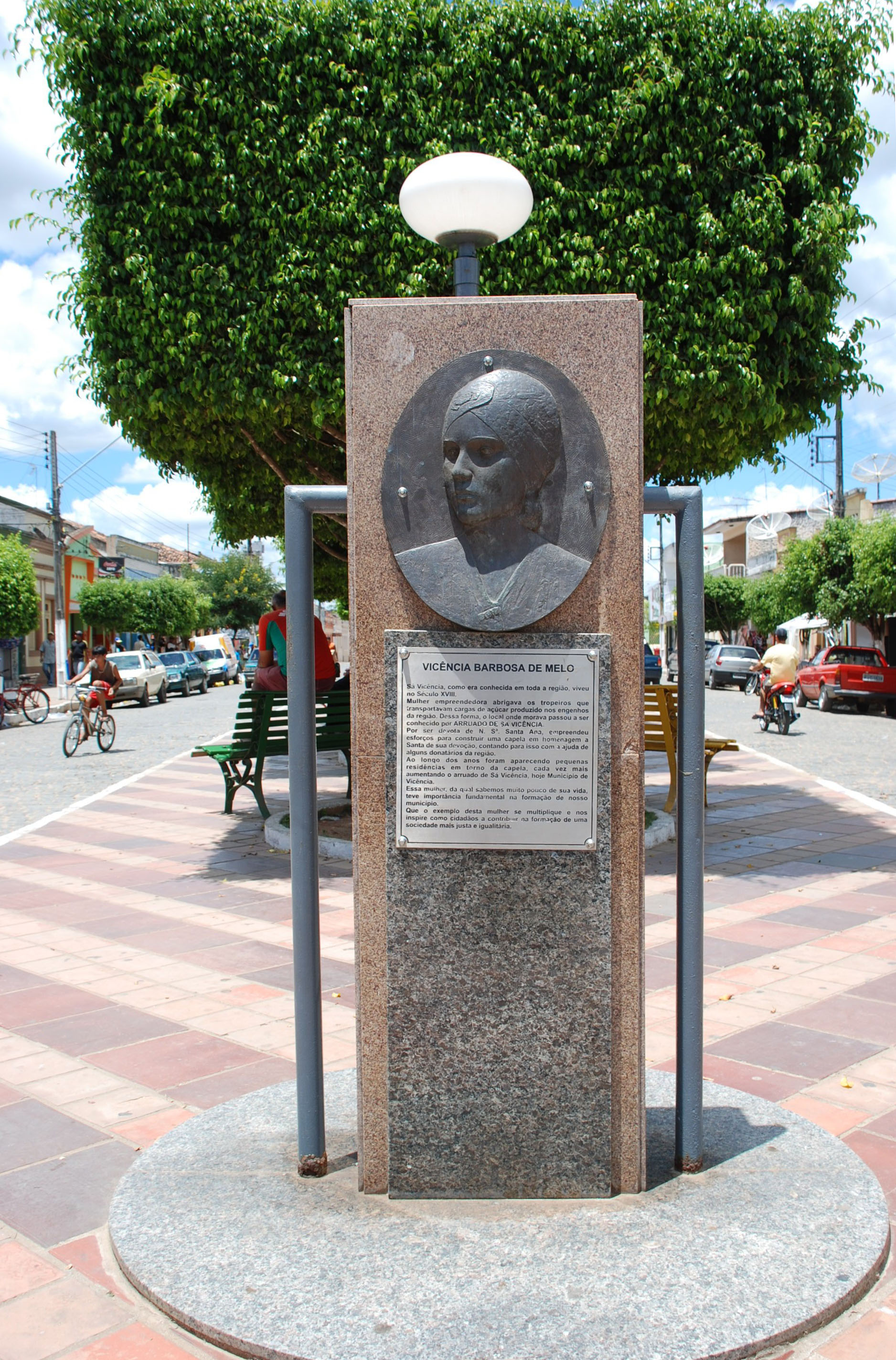
Bust of Vicência Barbosa de Melo (ex-owner of the city)

Vicência (Central northeastern portuguese pronunciation: [viˈsẽsiɐ]) is a city in the state of Pernambuco, Brazil. It is 81 km away from the state capital Recife. It has an estimated (IBGE 2020) population of 32,772 inhabitants.

== Geography ==
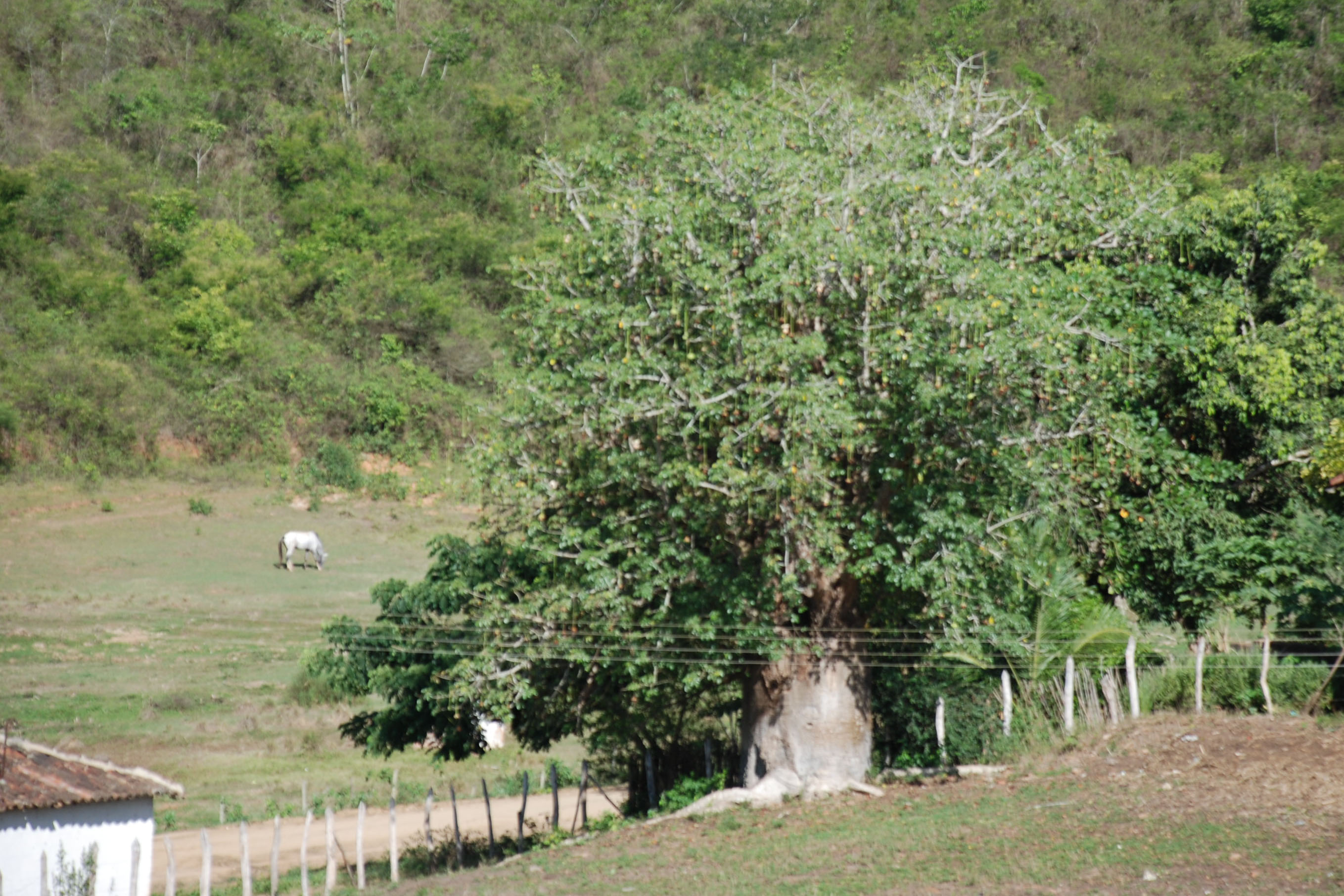
Typical Baobab tree, often saw in Pernambuco

- State - Pernambuco
- Region - Zona da mata Pernambucana
- Boundaries - Timbaúba and Macaparana (N); Limoeiro and Buenos Aires (S); Aliança (E); Bom Jardim and São Vicente Ferrer (W)
- Area - 230.82 km^{2}
- Elevation - 119 m
- Hydrography - Goiana River
- Vegetation - Subcaducifólia forest
- Climate - Hot tropical and humid
- Annual average temperature - 25.3 c
- Distance to Recife - 81 km

== Economy ==
The main economic activities in Vicência are based in food & beverage industry and agribusiness, especially sugarcane, bananas; and livestock such as cattle and poultry.

=== Economic indicators ===
Population	GDP x(1000 R$).	GDP pc (R$)	PE
27.877	125.629	4.592	0.21%

Economy by Sector 2006

Primary sector	Secondary sector	Service sector
33.59%	14.29%	52.12%

=== Health indicators ===
HDI (2000)	Hospitals (2007)	Hospitals beds (2007)	Children's Mortality every 1000 (2005)
0.644	2	78	14.5

== See also ==
- List of municipalities in Pernambuco
