= Abreu e Lima =

Municipality of Pernambuco, Brazil

Abreu e Lima Município de Abreu e Lima
- Municipality
- Flag Coat of arms

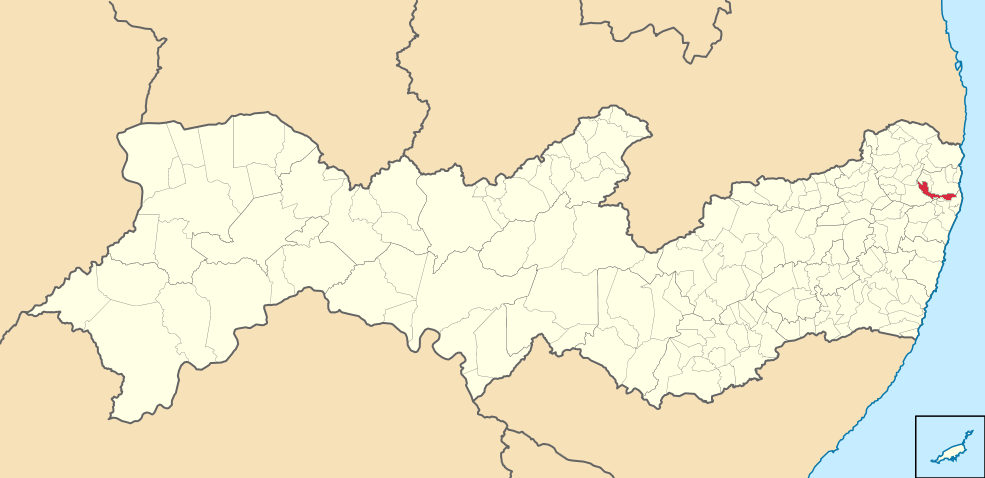
- Location of Abreu e Lima in Pernambuco

- Location of Abreu e Lima in Brazil
- Coordinates: 07°54′42″S 34°54′10″W
- Country: Brazil
- Region: Northeast
- State: Pernambuco
- Founded: May 14, 1982

Government
  - Mayor: Marcos José da Silva (PT, 2013-2016) (o)

Area
  - Total: 126.193 km^{2} (48.723 sq mi)
- Elevation: 19 m (62 ft)

Population (2022 Census)
  - Total: 98,462
  - Estimate (2025): 104,248
  - Density: 780.25/km^{2} (2,020.8/sq mi)
- Demonym: Abreu-limense
- Time zone: UTC−3 (BRT)
- Website: abreuelima.pe.gov.br

Abreu e Lima (Recifense portuguese pronunciation: [ɐˈbɾew i ˈlimɐ]) is a Brazilian municipality in the state of Pernambuco. It is located in the Metropolitan Region of Recife, also known as Greater Recife. Abreu e Lima covers 126.193 km^{2} (48.723 mi^{2}), and has a population of 98,462 with a population density of 780 inhabitants per square kilometer (2022 Census). 75% of the area of the municipality is rural, but only 8% of the population lives outside of the urban center.

The city was named in honor of José Inácio de Abreu e Lima (1794-1869), also known as "Inácio Pernambucano". Abreu e Lima participated in battles in Pernambuco and fought alongside Simón Bolivar in the wars of independence of Venezuela and Colombia.

Folklore is one of Abreu e Lima's main attractions. Visitors can enjoy the energetic drum rhythms of Maracatu dance performance, as well as Ciranda dance groups such as the one led by Dona Odete do Coco. The city's main festival is the Emancipation Festival, every May 14. Over 70 percent of Abreu e Lima's territory is covered by unspoilt Atlantic Forest and environmental reserves, such as those of São Bento and Caetés.

On March 31, 1983, the city held the first public event of Diretas Já, a popular movement against the military dictatorship.

== Geography ==
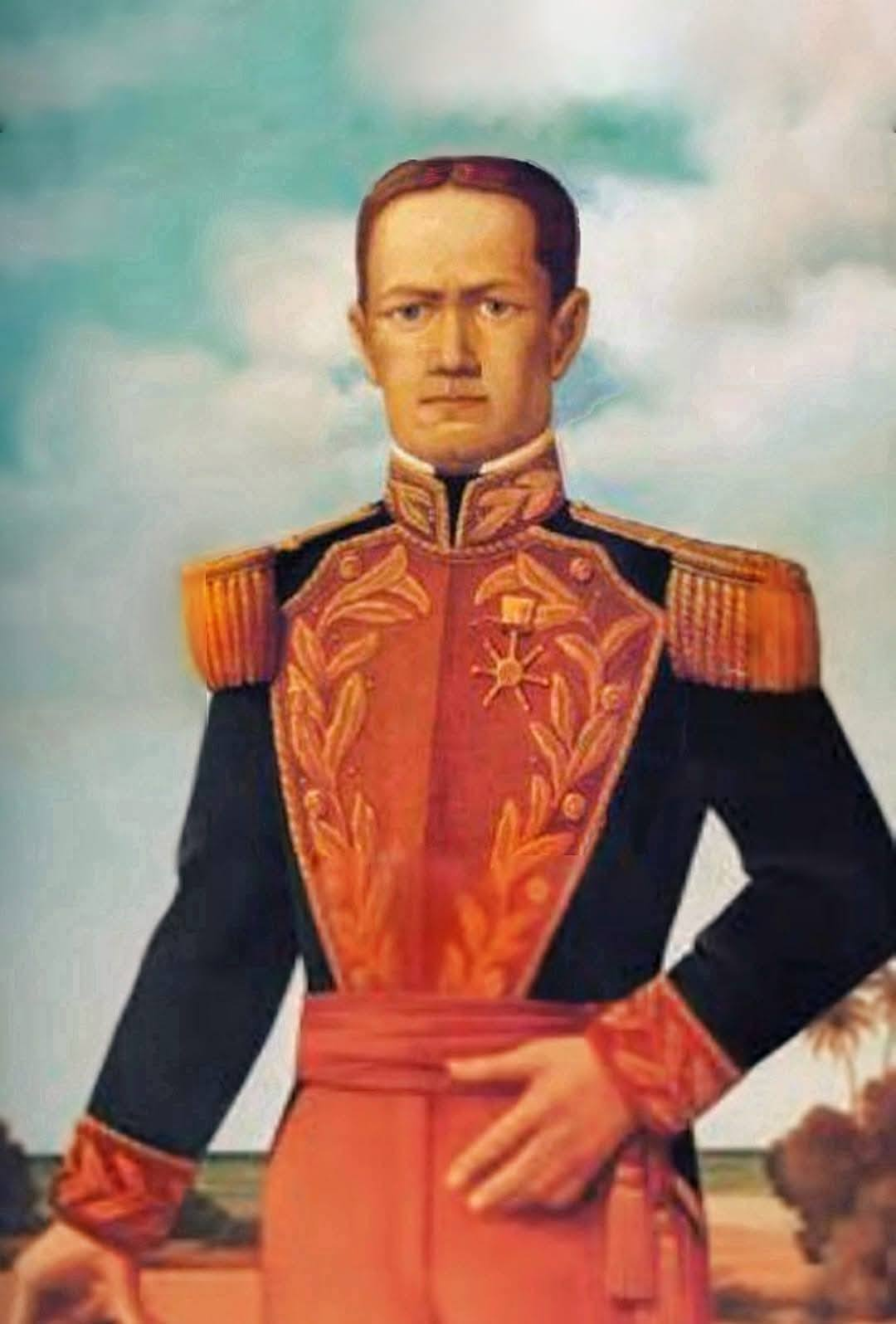
General Abreu e Lima

- Boundaries - Igarassu and Araçoiaba (N); Paulista (S and E), Paudalho (W)
- Hydrography - Small coast rivers
- Vegetation - Atlantic forest, Capoeirinha, sugarcane plantation and mangrove
- Clima - Hot tropical and humid
- Annual average temperature - 25.2 °C (45 °F)
- Main roads - BR 101
- Distance to Recife - 22 kilometres (14 mi)

== Economy ==
The main economic activities in Abreu e Lima are commerce and general industry, especially chemicals and metallurgic. The primary sector also plays an important role.

=== Economic indicators ===
Population	GDP x (1000 R$).	GDP pc (R$)	PE (%)	RMR (%)
96.266	567.474	6.154	0.92	1.42

Economy by Sector 2006

Primary sector	Secondary sector	Service sector
4.25%	35.35%	60.40%

=== Health Indicators ===
HDI (2000)	Hospitals (2007)	Hospitals beds (2007)	Children's Mortality every 1000 (2005)
0.73	2	115	16.9

== Religion ==
Abreu e Lima has the highest percentage (35%) of Evangelical Christians of any municipality in Brazil according to the Brazilian Institute of Geography and Statistics (IBGE) census of 2010, just below the percentage of Roman Catholics. In accordance with Municipal Law 632 of 2008, October 31 is a public holiday in Abreu e Lima, Evangelical Awareness Day (Dia da Consciência Evangélica).

== Education ==
Abreu e Lima is served by 33 schools: 22 in the urban area of the municipality, and 11 in the rural area.

== See also ==
- List of municipalities in Pernambuco
