= Macaparana =

Municipality of Pernambuco, Brazil

- Municipality of Pernambuco, Brazil
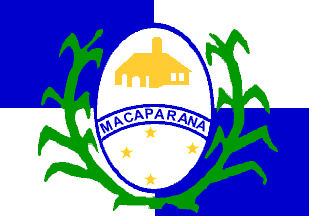
- Flag

- Location of Macaparana in Pernambuco

- Location within Brazil Location within South America
- Coordinates: 7°33′18″S 35°27′10″W
- Country: Brazil
- Region: Northeast
- State: Pernambuco
- Founded: 11 September 1928

Government
  - Mayor: Paulo Barbosa da Silva (PP) (2025-2028)
  - Vice Mayor: Gilvan Ribeiro de Andrade (PSDB) (2025-2028)

Area
  - Total: 108.049 km^{2} (41.718 sq mi)
- Elevation: 350 m (1,150 ft)

Population (2022 Census)
  - Total: 23,879
  - Estimate (2025): 24,642
  - Density: 221/km^{2} (570/sq mi)
- Demonym: Macaparanense (Brazilian Portuguese)
- Time zone: UTC-03:00 (Brasília Time)
- Postal code: 55865-000
- HDI (2010): 0.609 – medium
- Website: macaparana.pe.gov.br

Macaparana (Central northeastern portuguese pronunciation: [mɐkɐpɐˈɾɐ̃nɐ]) is a city located in the state of Pernambuco, Brazil. It is located 120 kilometres (75 miles) from Recife, the capital of Pernambuco. As of the 2022 census, it had a population of 23,879.

== Geography ==
- State – Pernambuco
- Region – Zona da mata Pernambucana
- Boundaries – Paraíba state (N and W); São Vicente Ferrer and Vicência (S); Timbaúba (E).
- Area – 126.35 square kilometres (48.78 square miles)
- Elevation – 350 metres (1,150 feet)
- Hydrography – Goiana River
- Vegetation – Subcaducifólia forest
- Climate – Hot tropical and humid
- Annual average temperature – 23.1 degrees Celsius (73.6 degrees Fahrenheit)
- Distance to Recife – 120 kilometres (75 miles)

== Economy ==
The main economic activities in Macaparana are based in industry, commerce and agribusiness, especially sugarcane, bananas; and livestock such as cattle and poultry.

=== Economic indicators ===
Population	GDP x(1000 R$).	GDP pc (R$)	PE
24.031	74.652	3.235	0.12%

Economy by Sector 2006

Primary sector	Secondary sector	Service sector
18.21%	9.84%	71.95%

=== Health indicators ===
HDI (2000)	Hospitals (2007)	Hospitals beds (2007)	Children's Mortality every 1000 (2005)
0.597	2	106	31.8

== See also ==
- List of municipalities in Pernambuco
