= Araçoiaba =

Municipality of Pernambuco, Brazil

Araçoiaba Arasuab
- City
- Flag Coat of arms

- Araçoiaba located in Brazil Map
- Coordinates: 07°47′17″S 35°05′23″W
- Country: Brazil
- State: Pernambuco
- Region: Recife metropolitan area (Recife)

Area
  - Total: 96.38 km^{2} (37.21 sq mi)
- Elevation: 160 m (520 ft)

Population (2022 Census)
  - Total: 19,243
  - Estimate (2025): 19,996
- Time zone: UTC−3 (BRT)
- Average Temperature: 24.5 C

Araçoiaba (Central northeastern portuguese pronunciation: [ɐɾɐsɔjˈɐbɐ]) (Arasuab) is a city in the state of Pernambuco, Brazil. It is in the Recife metropolitan area with another 13 cities. Araçoiaba has a total area of 96.38 square kilometers and had an estimated population of 20,733 inhabitants in 2020 according with IBGE.

== Geography ==
- State - Pernambuco
- Region - RMR (Recife)
- Boundaries - Igarassu (N and E), Abreu e Lima (S) and Tracunhaém (W)
- Area - 96.38 km^{2}
- Elevation - 160 m (520 ft)
- Hydrography - Goiana River
- Climate - Hot tropical and humid
- Annual average temperature - 24.5 c
- Main road - BR 101 and PE 041
- Distance to Recife - 38 km

== Economy ==
The main economic activities in Araçoiaba are based in the primary sector especially sugarcane and manioc and some light general industry.

=== Economic Indicators ===
Population	GDP x(1000 R$).	GDP pc (R$)	PE	RMR
17.484	48.939	2.962	0.08%	0.13%

Economy by Sector 2006

Primary sector	Secondary sector	Service sector
15.16%	10.12%	74.72%

=== Health Indicators ===
HDI (2000)	Hospitals (2007)	Hospitals beds (2007)	Children's Mortality every 1000 (2005)
0.637	1	4	30.5

== See also ==
- List of municipalities in Pernambuco
