= Odoguiinha =

Brazilian actor and singer

- Born: Jairo Douglas da Silva Lima; October 12, 2005 (age 21); Vitória de Santo Antão, Pernambuco, Brazil
- Occupations: Actor and Singer
- Notable work: Chiquititas and Amor sem Igual
- Height: 1.90
- Parent(s): Ana Paula Gomes and André Fernando Lima
- Relatives: Deyvson Fernando Lima

Odoguiinha (born 12 October 2005) is a Brazilian actor and singer.

== Early and personal life ==
Jairo Douglas da Silva Lima was born in Vitória de Santo Antão, Pernambuco, on October 12, 2005. He is the son of Ana Paula Gomes and André Fernando Lima, and brother of Deyvson Fernando Lima. He got involved with art from an early age and lived in his hometown until 2014, when he received an invitation to cast and went to live in São Paulo-SP.

== Career ==
He began his professional career as a model, but in 2014 he began working as an actor and gained national prominence when playing the role of 'Tatu' in the SBT soap opera, Chiquititas. He participated in the first phase of the soap opera Amor sem Igual, as the character 'Arthur', but due to the coronavirus pandemic the soap opera was interrupted and the character did not resume recording in the second phase.

In 2021, he played the character 'Guilherme' in the film Doce Encanto, alongside Ex-Carrossel Metturo, and directed by Brazilian filmmaker Cássio Pereira dos Santos.

In 2024, announces the ‘Celebrities’ tour, alongside Alana Sant Ex-The Voice Brasil from TV Globo, Priscila Senna, former vocalist of the band Musa, Luiz Kingsman and Vinicius Henuns, in who released the tracks "Intro (Speed Up)", "3 Doses" and "Dice" in her repertoire.

== Shows and Events ==
Odoguiinha has already made several presentations and appearances throughout Brazil, in addition to having modeled in fashion competitions in Pernambuco. He has been preparing a large repertoire for his upcoming shows.

== Discography ==
=== Singles ===
- Não Me Liga (2021)
- Não Me Liga - Remix (2022)
- New (2023)
- Intro - Speed Up (2023)
- Muero Por Tenerte (2024)
- Dice (2024)

== Filmography ==
Television

Year	Title	Paper
	Amor sem Igual	Arthur
2014	Chiquititas	Tatu #2

=== Films ===
Year	Title	Paper
2021	Doce Encanto	Guilherme
