= Carpina =

Municipality of Pernambuco, Brazil

- Municipality
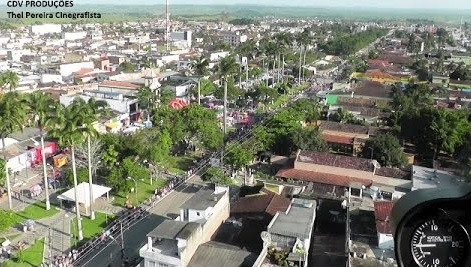
- View of Carpina

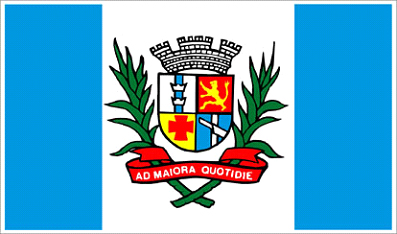
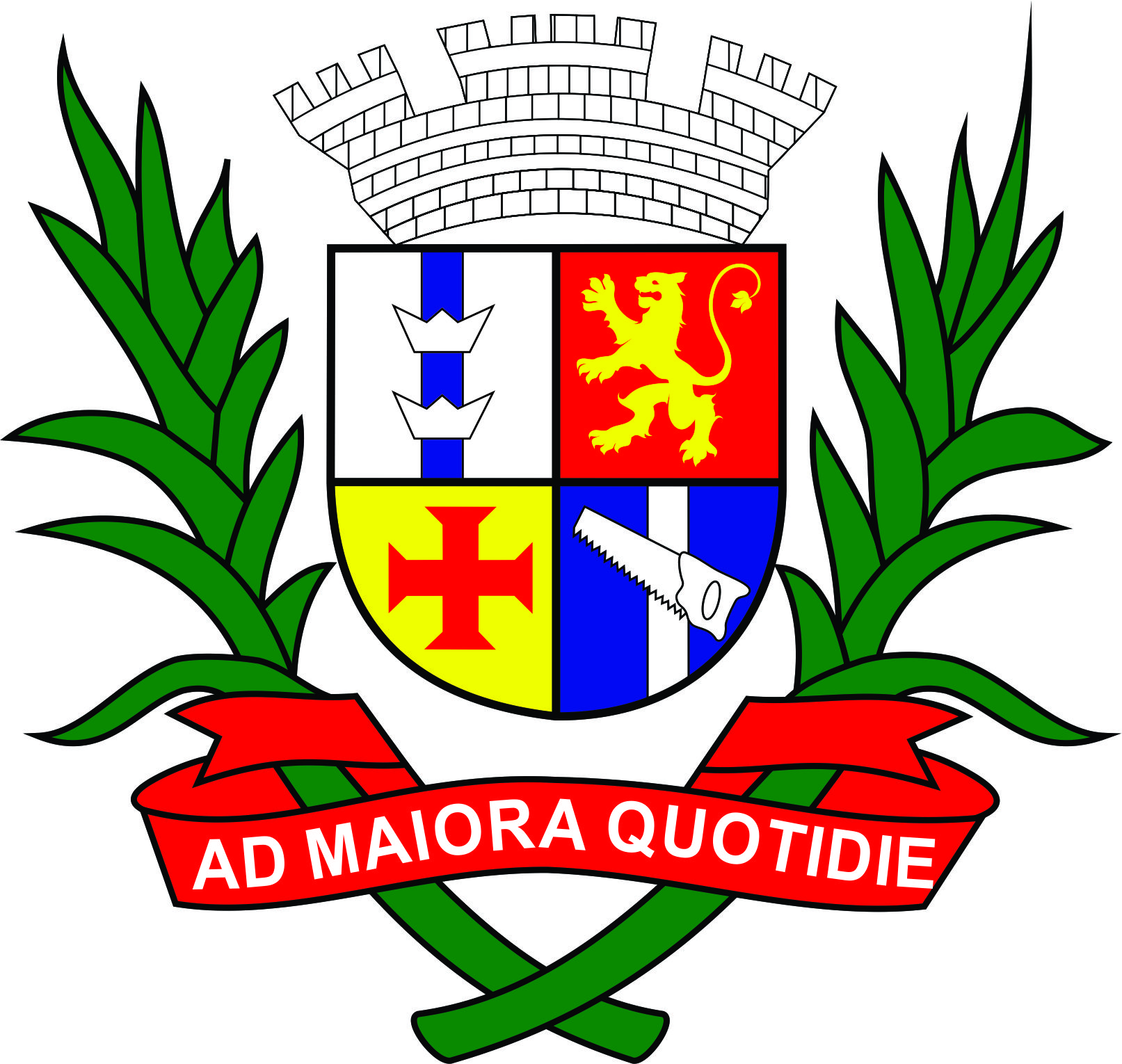
- Flag Coat of arms

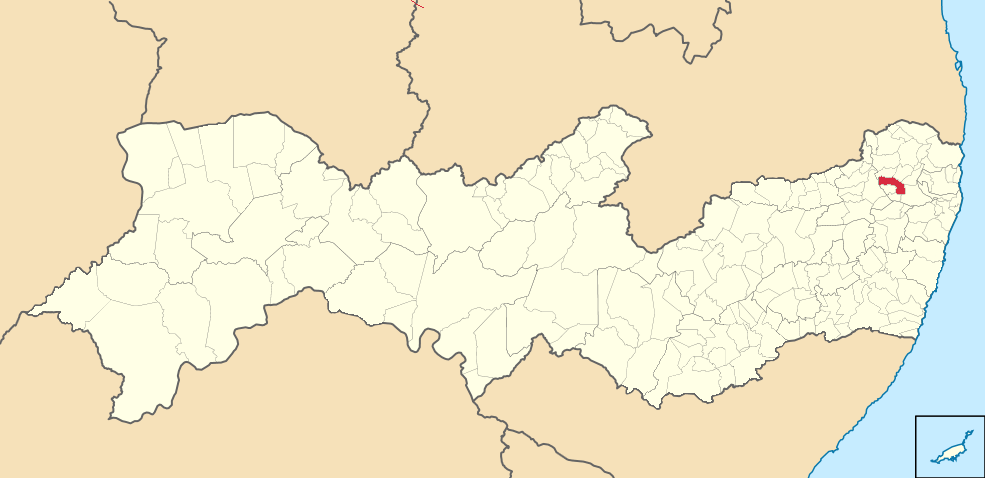
- Location in Pernambuco state

- Location in Brazil
- Coordinates: 7°51′03″S 35°15′17″W
- Country: Brazil
- Region: Northeast
- State: Pernambuco

Area
  - Total: 146.1 km^{2} (56.4 sq mi)
- Elevation: 184 m (604 ft)

Population (2022 Census)
  - Total: 79,293
  - Estimate (2025): 83,482
  - Density: 542.7/km^{2} (1,406/sq mi)
- Time zone: UTC−3 (BRT)

Carpina (Central northeastern portuguese pronunciation: [kɐɦˈpinɐ]) is a city in Pernambuco, Brazil. Its economy is based on commerce and footwear industry. Its current mayor is Manoel Botafogo.

== Geography ==
- State - Pernambuco
- Region - Zona da mata Pernambucana
- Boundaries - Tracunhaém, Buenos Aires and Nazaré da Mata (N); Lagoa do Itaenga and Lagoa do Carro (S); Limoeiro (W); Paudalho (E)
- Area - 146.1 km^{2}
- Elevation - 184 m
- Hydrography - Capibaribe and Goiana rivers
- Vegetation - Subcaducifólia forest
- Climate - Hot tropical and humid
- Annual average temperature - 23.3 c
- Distance to Recife - 50 km

== Economy ==
The main economic activities in Carpina are based in the footwear industry, commerce and agriculture especially sugarcane.

=== Economic indicators ===
Population	GDP x(1000 R$).	GDP pc (R$)	PE
83,482	351.448	5.375	0.57%

Economy by Sector 2006

Primary sector	Secondary sector	Service sector
4.43%	21.07%	74.50%

=== Health indicators ===
HDI (2000)	Hospitals (2007)	Hospitals beds (2007)	Children's Mortality every 1000 (2005)
0.724	2	99	15.2

== Notable people ==
- Jaílson França Braz, footballer
- Beto, football player
- Kempes, footballer and one of the LaMia Flight 2933 victims

== See also ==
- List of municipalities in Pernambuco
