= São Vicente Ferrer, Pernambuco =

Municipality of Pernambuco, Brazil

São Vicente Ferrer
- Municipality
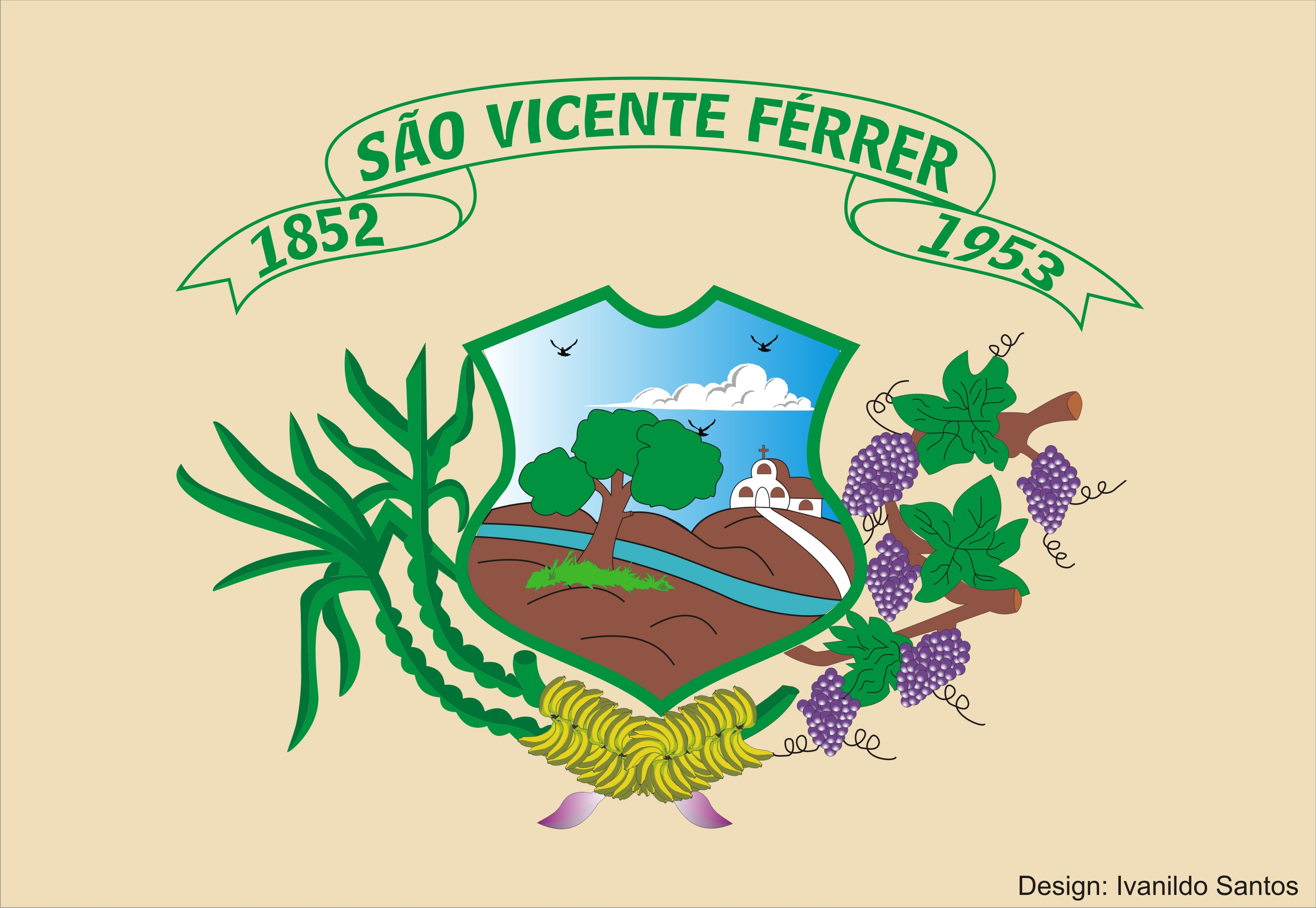
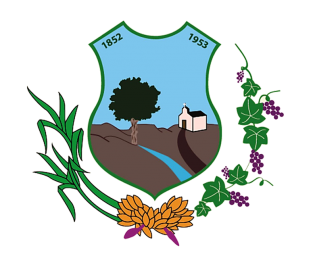
- Flag Coat of arms

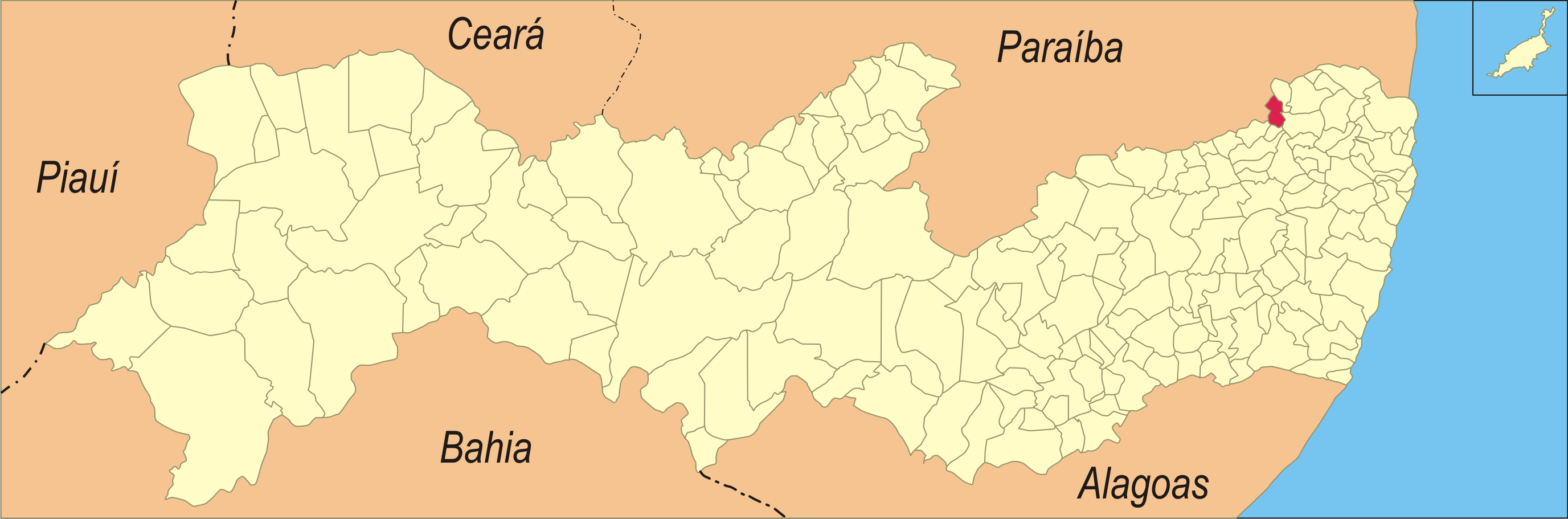
- Location in Pernambuco state

- Location in Brazil
- Coordinates: 7°35′27″S 35°29′27″W
- Country: Brazil
- Region: Northeast
- State: Pernambuco

Area
  - Total: 110.49 km^{2} (42.66 sq mi)
- Elevation: 419 m (1,375 ft)

Population (2022 Census)
  - Total: 16,677
  - Estimate (2025): 17,177
  - Density: 150.94/km^{2} (390.92/sq mi)
- Time zone: UTC−3 (BRT)

São Vicente Ferrer (Central northeastern portuguese pronunciation: [ˈsɐ̃w viˈsẽti fɛˈhɛ]) is a Brazilian municipality in the state of Pernambuco. According with IBGE in 2025, has an estimated population of 17,177 inhabitants. It has a total area of 110.49 square kilometres (42.66 sq mi).

== Geography ==
- State - Pernambuco
- Region - Agreste of Pernambuco
- Boundaries - Macaparana (N), Machados (S) Vicência (E); Orobó and Paraíba state (W).
- Area - 110.49 km^{2}
- Elevation - 419 m
- Hydrography - Goiana River
- Vegetation - Subcaducifólia forest
- Annual average temperature - 23.1 °C
- Distance to Recife - 131 km

== Economy ==
The main economic activities in São Vicente Ferrer are related with commerce and agribusiness, especially creations of cattle; and plantations of bananas, grapes and sugarcane.

=== Economic Indicators ===
Population	GDP x(1000 R$).	GDP pc (R$)	PE
17.333	63.254	3.811	0.103%

Economy by Sector 2006

Primary sector	Secondary sector	Service sector
34.95%	6.19%	58.86%

=== Health Indicators ===
HDI (2000)	Hospitals (2007)	Hospitals beds (2007)	Children's Mortality every 1000 (2005)
0.598	1	29	24.2

== See also ==
- List of municipalities in Pernambuco
