= Bom Jardim, Pernambuco =

Municipality of Pernambuco, Brazil

Bom Jardim
- Municipality of Pernambuco, Brazil
- Flag Coat of arms
- Etymology: In English "Good Garden", referring to the legend of a chaplain who, being captivated by the beauty of the area, exclaimed "Este sim é um Bom Jardim!" (English: "This is a Good Garden!")
- Location of Bom Jardim in Pernambuco

- Location within Brazil Location within South America
- Coordinates: 7°47′45″S 35°35′13″W
- Country: Brazil
- Region: Northeast
- State: Pernambuco
- Founded: 19 July 1871

Government
  - Mayor: Joao Francisco da Silva Neto (UNIÃO) (2025-2028)
  - Vice Mayor: Arsenio Medeiros de Oliveira (PL) (2025-2028)

Area
  - Total: 226.639 km^{2} (87.506 sq mi)
- Elevation: 504 m (1,654 ft)

Population (2022 Census)
  - Total: 37,629
  - Estimate (2025): 39,289
  - Density: 167.91/km^{2} (434.9/sq mi)
- Demonym: Bom-jardinense (Brazilian Portuguese)
- Time zone: UTC-03:00 (Brasília Time)
- Postal code: 55730-000, 55733-000, 55735-000
- HDI (2010): 0.602 – medium
- Website: bomjardim.pe.gov.br

Bom Jardim (Central northeastern portuguese pronunciation: [ˈbõ ʒaɦˈdĩ]) is a municipality/city in the state of Pernambuco in Brazil. The population in 2022 Census was 37,629 inhabitants and the total area is 226,639 km^{2}.

== Geography ==
- State - Pernambuco
- Region - Agreste of Pernambuco
- Boundaries - Orobó and Machados (N); João Alfredo (S); Vicência and Limoeiro (E); Surubim and Casinhas (W).
- Area - 218.43 km^{2}
- Elevation - 333 m
- Hydrography - Goiana River
- Vegetation - Subcaducifólia forest
- Climate - Tropical hot and humid
- Annual average temperature - 23.9 °C
- Distance to Recife - 115 km

== Economy ==
The main economic activities in Bom Jardim are related with extractive industry, commerce and agribusiness, especially breeding of cattle, goats, sheep, pigs, chickens; and plantations of bananas and pineapples.

=== Economic Indicators ===
Population	GDP x(1000 R$).	GDP pc (R$)	PE
40.924	117.505	3.011	0.19%

Economy by Sector 2006

Primary sector	Secondary sector	Service sector
12.05%	12.52%	75.43%

=== Health Indicators ===
HDI (2000)	Hospitals (2007)	Hospitals beds (2007)	Children's Mortality every 1000 (2005)
0.618	1	46	23.7

== See also ==
- List of municipalities in Pernambuco
