= Orobó =

City in Pernambuco, Brazil

- Municipality of Pernambuco, Brazil
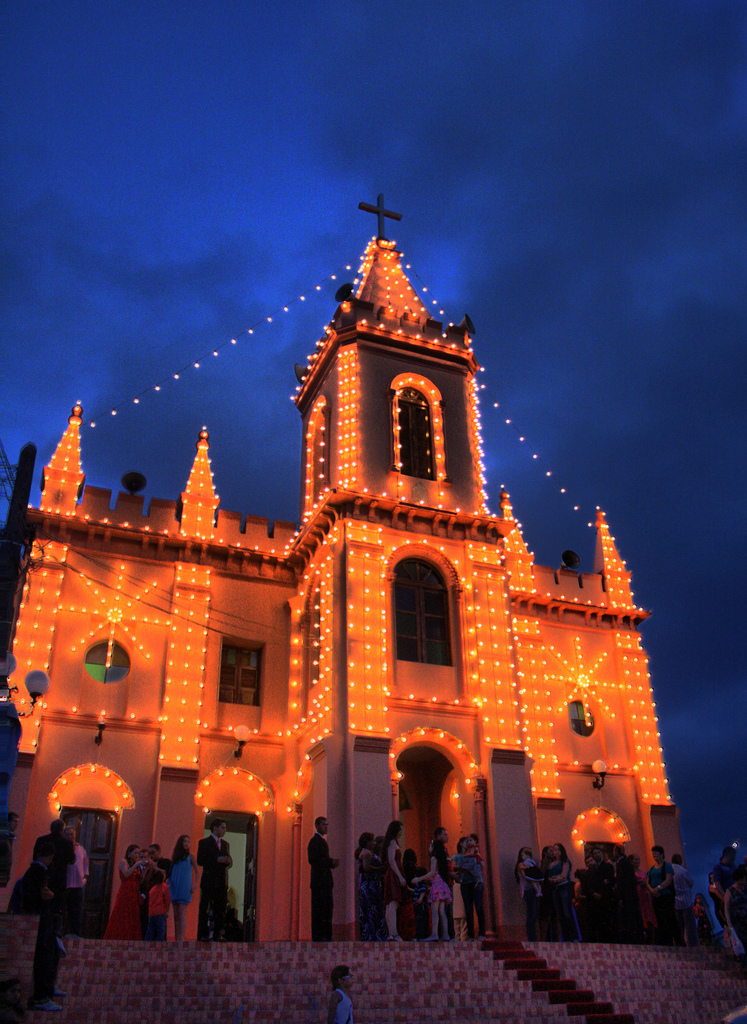
- Parish of Our Lady of Conception church

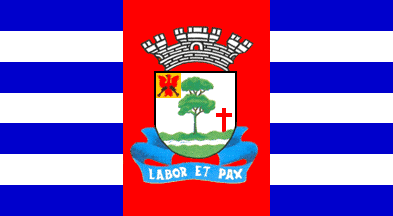
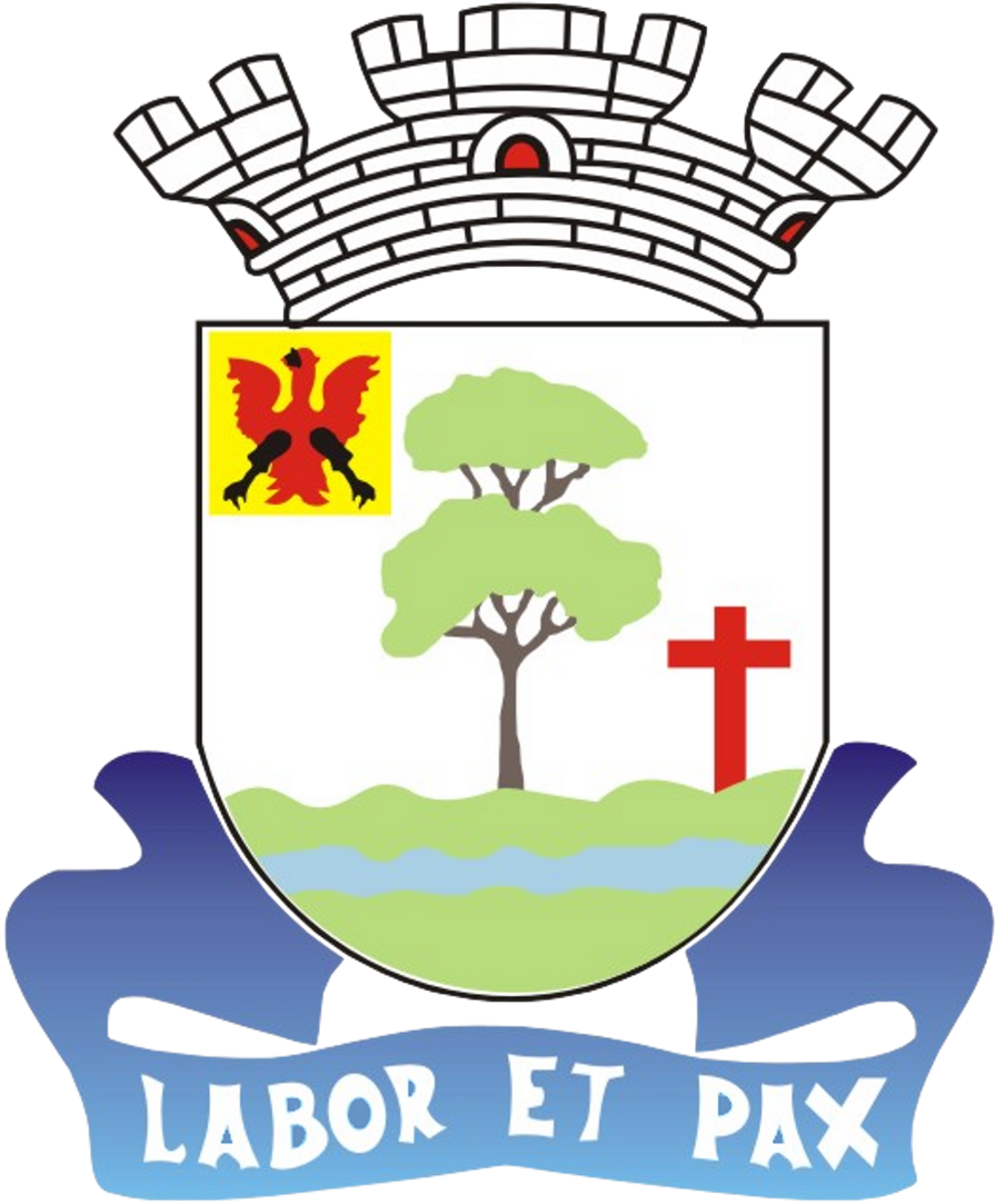
- Flag Coat of arms
- Etymology: Named after the Orobó stream
- Motto: Latin: Labor et Pax; English: Work and Peace
- Location of Orobó in Pernambuco

- Location within Brazil Location within South America
- Coordinates: 7°44′42″S 35°36′7″W
- Country: Brazil
- Region: Northeast
- State: Pernambuco
- Founded: 11 September 1928

Government
  - Mayor: Severino Luiz Pereira de Abreu (PSDB) (2025-2028)
  - Vice Mayor: Lia Mãe de Chaparral (UNIÃO) (2025-2028)

Area
  - Total: 138.362 km^{2} (53.422 sq mi)
- Elevation: 415 m (1,362 ft)

Population (2022 Census)
  - Total: 21,808
  - Estimate (2025): 22,412
  - Density: 157.43/km^{2} (407.7/sq mi)
- Demonym: Orobense (Brazilian Portuguese)
- Time zone: UTC-03:00 (Brasília Time)
- Postal code: 55745-000, 55746-000, 55747-000, 55748-000
- HDI (2010): 0.610 – medium
- Website: orobo.pe.gov.br

Orobó (Central northeastern portuguese pronunciation: [ɔɾɔˈbɔ]) is a municipality/city in the state of Pernambuco in Brazil. The population in 2025 was 22,412 inhabitants and the total area is 138,362 km^{2}. The city has the lowest children's mortality rate of the state (2.9) and one of the lowest in the whole country.

== Geography ==
- State - Pernambuco
- Region - Agreste of Pernambuco
- Boundaries - Paraíba state (N); Bom Jardim (S); Machados and São Vicente Ferrer (E); Casinhas (W).
- Area - 140.78 km^{2}
- Elevation - 415 m
- Hydrography - Goiana River
- Vegetation - Caducifólia and Subcaducifólia forests
- Climate - Tropical hot and humid
- Annual average temperature - 25.0 c
- Distance to Recife - 127.4 km

== Economy ==
The main economic activities in Orobó are related with commerce and agribusiness, especially creations of cattle, goats, pigs, chickens; and plantations of bananas and sugarcane.

=== Economic Indicators ===
Population	GDP x(1000 R$).	GDP pc (R$)	PE
22.239	72.461	3.350	0.12%

Economy by Sector 2006

Primary sector	Secondary sector	Service sector
20.17%	6.74%	73.09%

=== Health Indicators ===
HDI (2000)	Hospitals (2007)	Hospitals beds (2007)	Children's Mortality every 1000 (2005)
0.612	1	29	2.9

== See also ==
- List of municipalities in Pernambuco
