= Limoeiro =

Municipality of Pernambuco, Brazil

- City
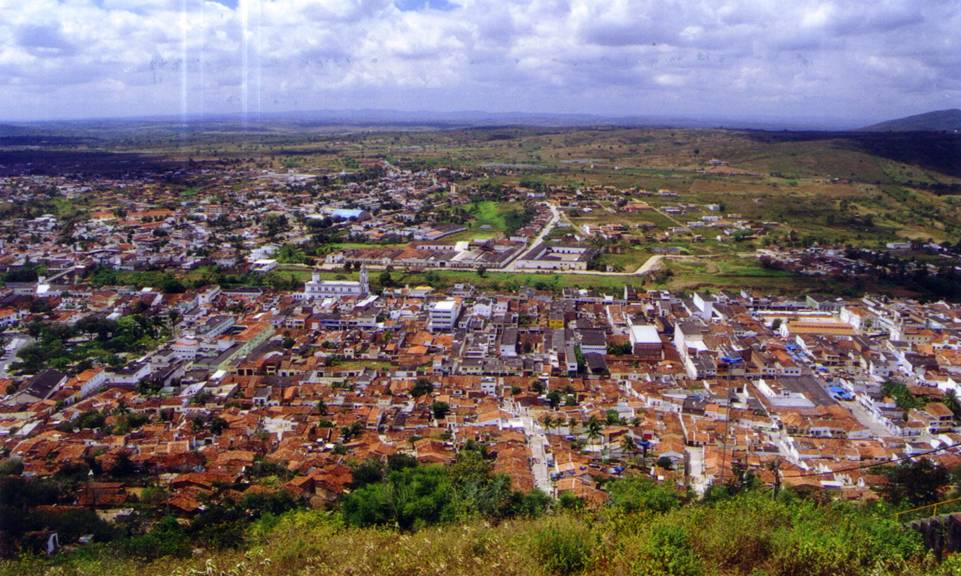
- Limoeiro Overview

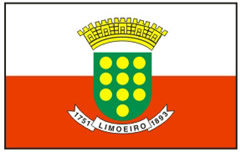
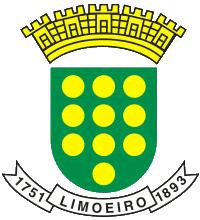
- Flag Coat of arms

- Limoeiro located in Brazil map
- Coordinates: 7°52′30″S 35°27′00″W
- Country: Brazil
- State: Pernambuco
- Region: Agreste

Area
  - Total: 269.97 km^{2} (104.24 sq mi)
- Elevation: 138 m (453 ft)

Population (2022 Census)
  - Total: 56,510
  - Estimate (2025): 59,236
- Time zone: UTC−3 (BRT)
- Average Temperature: 25.1 °C (77.2 °F)

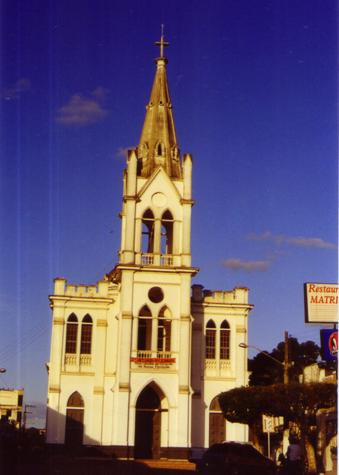
Limoeiro's principal church

Limoeiro (Central northeastern portuguese pronunciation: [limoˈeɾu]) is a city in Pernambuco, Brazil.

== Geography ==
- State - Pernambuco
- Region - Agreste Pernambucano
- Boundaries - Vicência (N); Passira and Feira Nova (S); Carpina, Lagoa do Carro and Buenos Aires (E); Bom Jardim, Salgadinho and João Alfredo (W)
- Area - 269.97 km^{2}
- Elevation - 138 m
- Hydrography - Capibaribe and Tracunhaém rivers
- Vegetation - Caducifólia forest
- Climate - hot, tropical, and humid
- Annual average temperature - 25.1 °C
- Distance to Recife - 91 km

== Economy ==
The main economic activities in Limoeiro are based in industry, commerce, tourism and agribusiness; especially plantations of bananas and sugarcane, and the raising of cattle, goats, sheep, pigs and chickens.

=== Economic indicators ===
Population	GDP x(1000 R$).	GDP pc (R$)	PE
57.243	219.496	3.951	0.37%

Economy by sector (2006)

Primary sector	Secondary sector	Service sector
5.76%	12.32%	81.92%

=== Health indicators ===
HDI (2000)	Hospitals (2007)	Hospitals beds (2007)	Children's mortality every 1000 (2005)
0.688	2	141	17.2

== See also ==
- List of municipalities in Pernambuco
