= Machados =

Municipality of Pernambuco, Brazil

- City
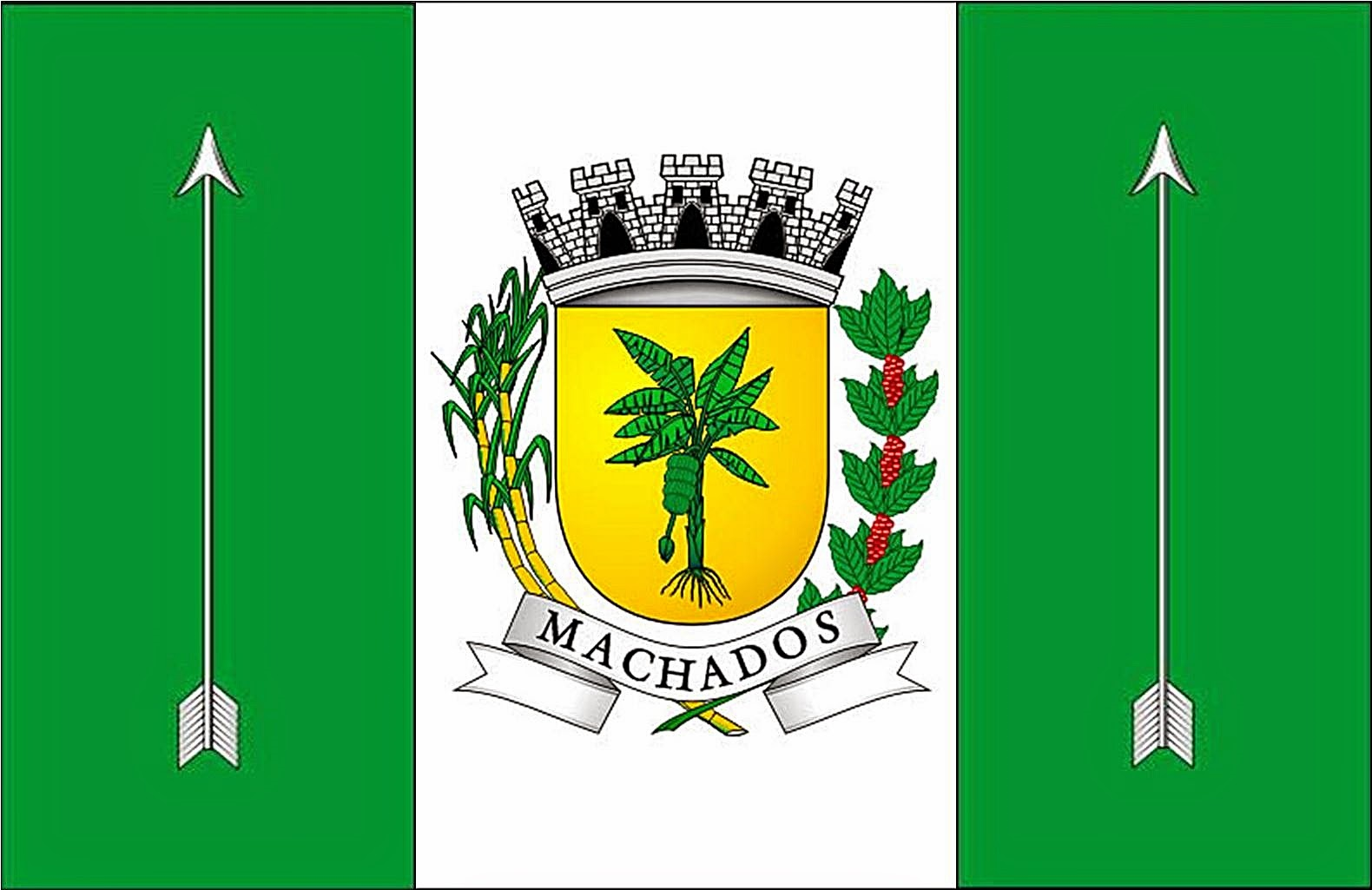
- Flag

- Machados located in Brazil Map
- Coordinates: 7°41′09″S 35°30′54″W
- Country: Brazil
- State: Pernambuco
- Region: Agreste

Area
  - Total: 56.96 km^{2} (21.99 sq mi)
- Elevation: 320 m (1,050 ft)

Population (2022 Census)
  - Total: 11,333
  - Estimate (2025): 11,387
- Time zone: UTC−3 (BRT)

Machados (Central northeastern portuguese pronunciation: [maˈʃɐdu(s)]) (population 11.802) is a city in northeastern Brazil, in the State of Pernambuco. It lies in the mesoregion of Agreste of Pernambuco and has an area of 56.96 square kilometres (21.99 square miles). It is the largest producer of bananas of the state, with over 21.000 ton.

== Geography ==
- State – Pernambuco
- Region – Agreste of Pernambuco
- Boundaries – São Vicente Ferrer (N); Bom Jardim (S and E); Orobó (W).
- Area – 56.96 square kilometres (21.99 square miles)
- Elevation – 320 metres (1,050 feet)
- Hydrography – Goiana River
- Vegetation – Subcaducifólia forest
- Annual average temperature – 23.9 degrees Celsius (75.0 degrees Fahrenheit)
- Distance to Recife – 320 kilometres (200 miles)

== Economy ==
The main economic activities in Machados are related with commerce and agribusiness, especially bananas, sugarcane and cattle.

=== Economic Indicators ===
Population	GDP x(1000 R$).	GDP pc (R$)	PE
11.802	39.772	3.566	0.07%

Economy by Sector (2006)

Primary sector	Secondary sector	Service sector
28.49%	7.39%	64.12%

=== Health Indicators ===
HDI (2000)	Hospitals (2007)	Hospitals beds (2007)	Children's Mortality every 1000 (2005)
0.601	1	9	23.6

== See also ==
- List of municipalities in Pernambuco
