= Capibaribe River =

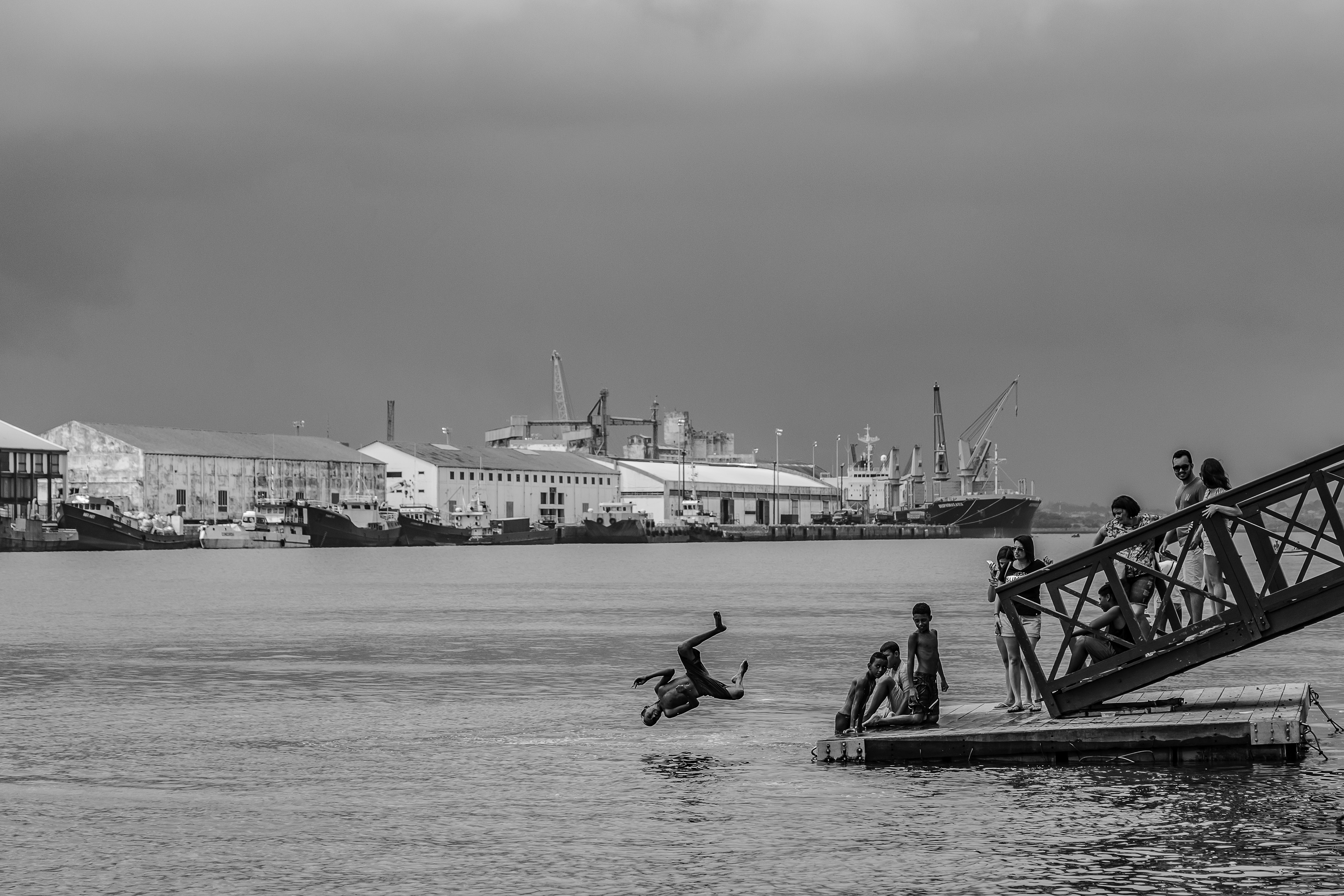
- Capibaribe River in Recife

Location
- Country: Brazil

Physical characteristics
- Source
  - location: Serra do Jacarará
  - elevation: 1,100 meters (3,600 ft)
- Mouth
  - location: Atlantic Ocean
- Length: 240 km (150 mi)

The Capibaribe River (Portuguese: Rio Capibaribe) is a river located in Pernambuco state, Brazil, with a length of 240 kilometers. The Capibaribe originates in the Serra do Jacarará, in the municipality of Poção, and flows to the Atlantic Ocean at Recife.

== Etymology ==
The word Capibaribe derives from the Tupi names Caapiuar-y-be or Capibara-ybe, meaning Capybara River.

== Sports ==
Recife's sport team Clube Náutico Capibaribe is named after the Capibaribe River.

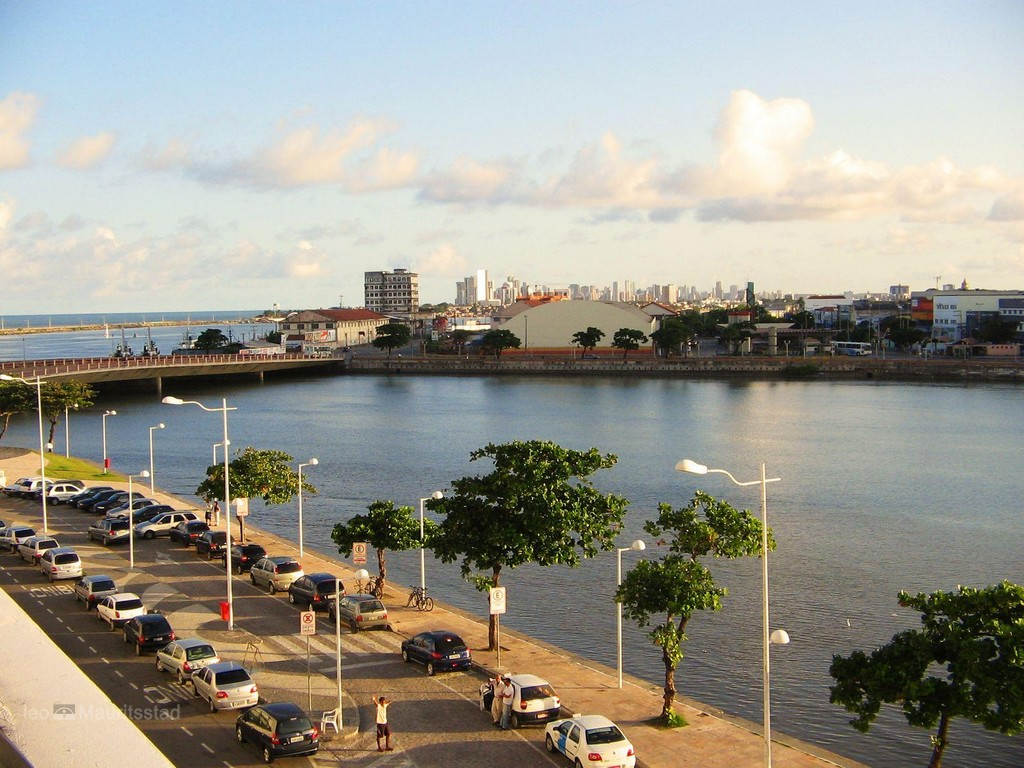
Capibaribe River in Recife, Brazil.

== History ==
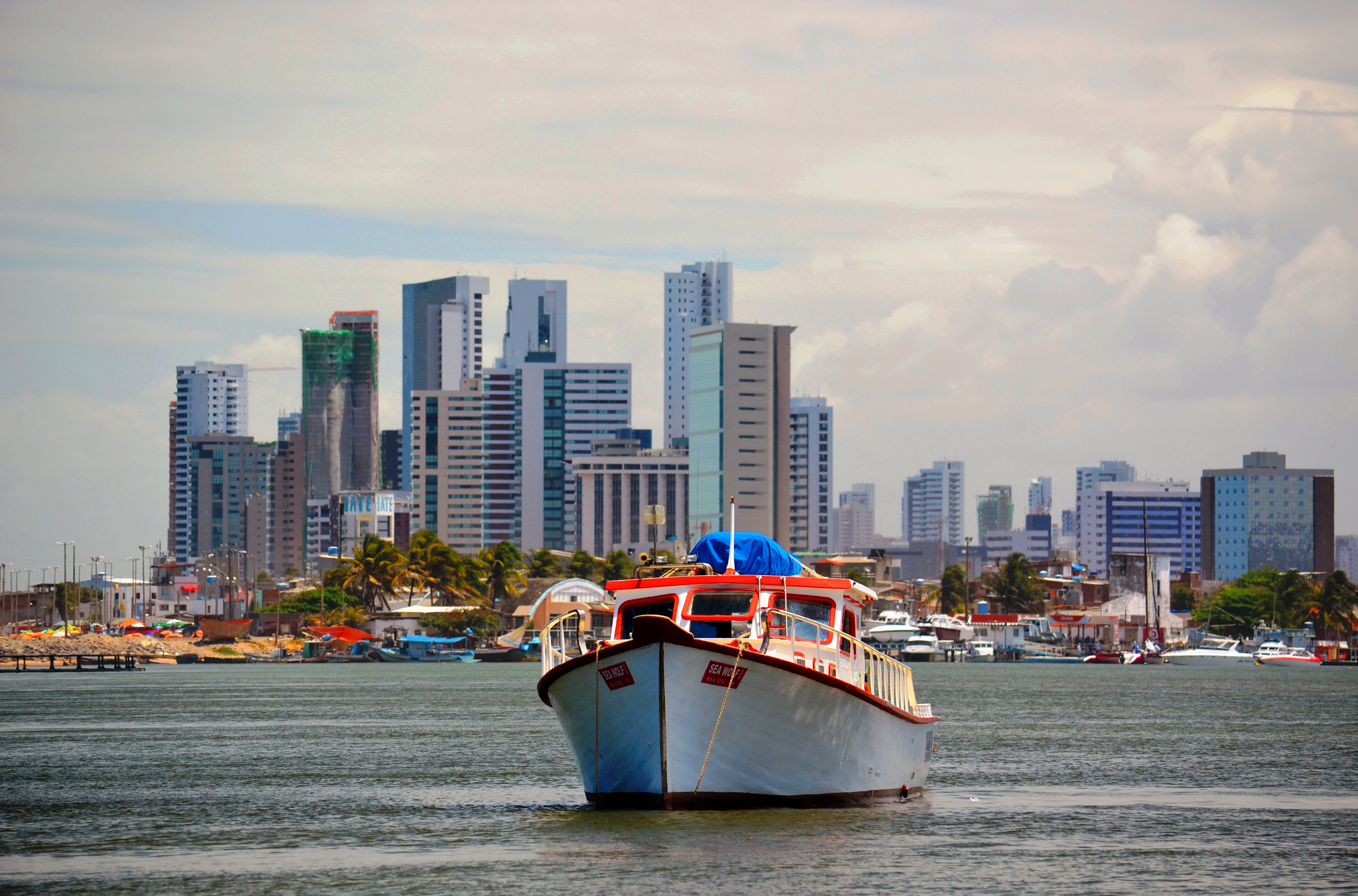
Capibaribe River in Recife, Brazil

The Capibaribe River was a significant geographic determinant factor in the history of Pernambuco State and the Northeast of Brazil. It was in the floodplains of the river that the first sugar cane mills were formed, its black clay soil being suitable for the cultivation of agricultural crops. The river also served as a starting point to reach the wilderness areas beyond. Access to the wilderness enabled the development of a livestock farming industry. Today, ongoing studies about the navigability of the river for urban transportation will assist in developing the region further.
