= List of cities in the Americas by year of foundation =

This is a list of cities in the Americas (South, Central and North) by founding year and present-day country.

Year	City	Region	Country	Notes
13,000 BC	Wyam	Oregon	United States	
7500 BC	Tlapacoya	Ixtapaluca	Mexico	
4000 BC	Puerto Hormiga Culture	Cartagena	Colombia	
3710 BC	Aspero	Norte Chico	Peru	
2627 BC	Caral	Norte Chico	Peru	
1500 BC	Kaminaljuyu	Guatemala City	Guatemala	
900 BC	Flores	Petén	Guatemala	Formerly Nojpetén, the capital of the Itza kingdom, it has been occupied continuously since prehispanic times. Earliest archaeological traces date back to 900–600 BC, with major expansion of the settlement occurring around 250–400 AD. Ethnohistoric documents claim the founding of Nojpetén in the mid-15th century AD
800 BC	Cholula	Puebla	Mexico	Oldest continually inhabited city in Mexico
800 BC	Cuicuilco	Mexico City	Mexico	
700 BC	Ticul	Yucatán	Mexico	
300 BC	Teotihuacan	State of Mexico	Mexico	In the Valley of Mexico
37	El Baúl	Escuintla	Guatemala	
200	Mitla	Oaxaca	Mexico	
200	Acanceh	Yucatán	Mexico	
328	Uaxactún	Petén	Guatemala	
500	Cuenca	Azuay	Ecuador	
524	Ejutla	Oaxaca	Mexico	
550	Izamal	Yucatán	Mexico	
600	Cahokia	Illinois	United States	
713	Tula	Hidalgo	Mexico	
1001	L'Anse aux Meadows	Newfoundland and Labrador	Canada	Oldest known European (Norse) settlement in the Americas. Possibly founded by Leif Erikson, as part of Vinland, in 1001 AD.
1000	Acoma Pueblo and Taos Pueblo	New Mexico	United States	
1050	Motul	Yucatán	Mexico	
1050	Pachuca	Hidalgo	Mexico	
1100	Cusco	Cusco Province	Peru	
1100	Oraibi	Arizona	United States	Hopi Reservation
1168	Ecatepec	State of Mexico	Mexico	
1259	Chimalhuacán	State of Mexico	Mexico	
1313	Xalapa	Veracruz	Mexico	
1325	Tenochtitlan	Mexico City	Mexico	Largest pre-Columbian city in the Americas, later called Mexico City.
1450	Etzanoa	Kansas	United States	
1450	Zuni Pueblo	New Mexico	United States	
1470	Iximche	Chimaltenango	Guatemala	
1493	La Isabela	Puerto Plata	Dominican Republic	First European settlement in the New World during the Age of Discovery. Abandoned by 1500.
1494	Concepción de la Vega	La Vega	Dominican Republic	Founded by Christopher Columbus in 1494 as a gold town, the original place was abandoned by 1562 after an earthquake destroyed the settlement and refounded 5 kilometers away between 1562-1564. Was destroyed again in 1805 by the Dessalines invasion and by an earthquake in 1843.
1498	Santo Domingo	Distrito Nacional	Dominican Republic	Capital of the Dominican Republic. Oldest continuously inhabited European established settlement in the Americas. Founded in 1498, by Bartholomew Columbus.
1502	Santa Cruz del Seibo	El Seibo	Dominican Republic	
1504	Azua de Compostela	Azua	Dominican Republic	
1504	Santiago de los Caballeros	Santiago	Dominican Republic	
1505	Cotuí	Sánchez Ramírez	Dominican Republic	
1506	Salvaleón de Higüey	La Altagracia	Dominican Republic	
1508	Bonao	Monseñor Nouel	Dominican Republic	
1508	Caparra	Puerto Rico	United States	First city founded by Europeans in Puerto Rico. Abandoned in 1521 with its transfer to the nearby San Juan Islet as San Juan Bautista de Puerto Rico, today Old San Juan historic quarter in San Juan.
1510	Santa María la Antigua del Darién	Urabá	Colombia	First city founded by Europeans on the continent of South America.
1510	Nombre de Dios	Colon	Panama	Oldest continuously inhabited European established settlement in Panama.
1511	Baracoa	Guantánamo	Cuba	Oldest continuously inhabited European established settlement in Cuba, former capital of Cuba.
1513	Bayamo	Granma	Cuba	
1514	Sancti Spiritus	Sancti Spiritus	Cuba	
1514	Trinidad	Sancti Spiritus	Cuba	
1515	Santiago	Santiago	Cuba	After Baracoa and before Havana, Santiago was the second capital of Cuba.
1515	Cumaná	Sucre	Venezuela	Oldest continuously inhabited European established settlement in Venezuela.
1519	Havana	Havana	Cuba	Established in 1519 as a trading post. It became the de facto capital of Cuba in 1556 and its official capital in 1607.
1519	La Villa Rica de la Vera Cruz, (Veracruz)	Veracruz	Mexico	Oldest continuously inhabited European established settlement in Mexico.
1519	Panamá City	Panamá	Panama	First European established city on the Pacific Coast of the Americas. Founded in 1519, it was sacked and destroyed by the Welsh pirate Henry Morgan in 1671, and abandoned for nearby Casco Viejo in 1673.
1520	Hato Mayor del Rey	Hato Mayor	Dominican Republic	
1521	San Juan	Puerto Rico	United States	Oldest continuously inhabited European-established settlement in Puerto Rico and the United States. Oldest continuously inhabited state or territorial capital in the United States. Second-oldest European-established continuously inhabited capital city in the Americas, after Santo Domingo.
1524	Granada	Granada	Nicaragua	Oldest continuously inhabited European established settlement in Nicaragua.
1524	Quetzaltenango	Quetzaltenango	Guatemala	Oldest continuously inhabited European established settlement in Guatemala.
1524	Tecpán	Chimaltenango	Guatemala	First capital of Guatemala.
1524	Trujillo	Colón	Honduras	Oldest continuously inhabited European established settlement in Honduras.
1525	Santa Marta	Magdalena	Colombia	Oldest continuously inhabited European established settlement in Colombia.
1525	Acapulco	Guerrero	Mexico	
1525	San Salvador	San Salvador	El Salvador	Founded in 1525, rebuilt and changed locations twice afterwards (1528 and 1545) and oldest continuously inhabited European established settlement in El Salvador.
1526	Acámbaro	Guanajuato	Mexico	
1526	Chimaltenango	Chimaltenango	Guatemala	
1527	Coro	Falcón	Venezuela	
1528	Nueva Cádiz	Cubagua	Venezuela	
1528	San Cristóbal de las Casas	Chiapas	Mexico	Originally called Villa Real de Chiapa.
1528	Camagüey	Camagüey Province	Cuba	Founded in 1515 the northern coast of Camagüey as "Puerto del Príncipe", but moved in 1528 to present location.
1529	Maracaibo	Zulia	Venezuela	
1530	San Blas	Nayarit	Mexico	By Nuño Beltrán
1530	San Miguel	San Miguel	El Salvador	
1531	Puebla	Puebla	Mexico	by Fr. Toribio de Benavente ("Motolinía") on 16 April
1531	Mazatlán	Sinaloa	Mexico	
1531	Culiacán	Sinaloa	Mexico	Founded as Villa de San Miguel de Culiacán on September 29, 1531 by Nuño Beltrán de Guzmán.
1531	Tepic	Nayarit	Mexico	As capital of Nueva Galicia
1532	Compostela de Indias	Nayarit	Mexico	
1532	Oaxaca	Oaxaca	Mexico	
1532	Piura	Piura	Peru	Founded by Spanish conquistador Francisco Pizarro the oldest continuously inhabited European established settlement in Peru.
1532	São Vicente	São Paulo	Brazil	Oldest continuously inhabited European established settlement in Brazil, oldest Portuguese established settlement in the New World.
1532	Itanhaém	São Paulo	Brazil	Second oldest city in Brazil.
1532	Cananéia	São Paulo	Brazil	
1533	Cartagena de Indias	Bolívar	Colombia	
1534	Porto Seguro	Bahia	Brazil	Known as the first place on the Americas to be discovered by the Portuguese in 1500 by Pedro Álvares Cabral. The first church was erected in 1503.
1534	Otavalo	Imbabura	Ecuador	
1534	Ilheos/Ilhéus	Bahia	Brazil	
1534	Quito	Pichincha	Ecuador	Oldest continuously inhabited European established settlement in Ecuador.
1534	Spanish Town	Saint Catherine	Jamaica	Founded by the Spanish as Santiago de la Vega or St. Jago de la Vega. Oldest continuously inhabited European established settlement in Jamaica.
1534	Trujillo	La Libertad	Peru	
1535	Lima	Lima	Peru	
1535	Igarassu	Pernambuco	Brazil	Site of first European settlement in Brazil, the feitoria of Igarassu, in 1516.
1535	Olinda	Pernambuco	Brazil	One of the best-preserved colonial cities in Brazil.
1535	Vila Velha	Espírito Santo	Brazil	
1535	Paria	Oruro	Bolivia	First Spanish settlement in Bolivia
1536	Santiago de Cali	Valle del Cauca	Colombia	
1536	Popayán	Cauca	Colombia	
1536	San Pedro Sula	Cortés	Honduras	
1536	Tupiza	Potosí	Bolivia	
1537	Asunción	Distrito Capital	Paraguay	Oldest continuously inhabited European established settlement in Paraguay.
1537	Recife	Pernambuco	Brazil	Capital of the state of Pernambuco. It is the oldest city among Brazil's current state capitals.
1537	Comayagua	Comayagua	Honduras	
1538	Bogotá	Cundinamarca	Colombia	
1538	Guayaquil	Guayas	Ecuador	
1538	Iguape	São Paulo	Brazil	
1538	Sucre	Chuquisaca	Bolivia	Originally called Ciudad de la Plata de la Nueva Toledo and the oldest continuously inhabited European established settlement in Bolivia.
1539	Tunja	Boyacá	Colombia	
1539	Vélez	Santander	Colombia	
1539	Pasto	Nariño	Colombia	
1540	Arequipa	Arequipa	Peru	
1540	Ayacucho	Ayacucho	Peru	
1540	Yuriria	Guanajuato	Mexico	
1540	Mompox	Bolivar	Colombia	
1540	Supía	Caldas	Colombia	
1540	Campeche	Campeche	Mexico	Founded on the site of Mayan village Kimpech.
1540	Childersburg	Alabama	United States	Already at that time a village of the Coosa
1541	Huánuco	Huánuco	Peru	
1541	Moquegua	Moquegua	Peru	
1541	Santiago	Santiago	Chile	Oldest continuously inhabited European established settlement in Chile.
1541	Santafé de Antioquia	Antioquia	Colombia	
1542	Guadalajara	Jalisco	Mexico	
1542	Genaro Codina	Zacatecas	Mexico	
1542	San Miguel de Allende	Guanajuato	Mexico	
1542	Mérida	Yucatán	Mexico	Built on the site of Mayan city T'ho.
1542	San Luis de la Paz	Guanajuato	Mexico	
1543	Antigua Guatemala	Sacatepéquez	Guatemala	
1543	Cobán	Alta Verapaz	Guatemala	
1543	Santa Cruz Verapaz	Alta Verapaz	Guatemala	
1544	La Serena	Coquimbo Region	Chile	Originally founded as Villanueva de La Serena, the city was destroyed completely in a native uprising in 1549 and re-founded the same year as San Bartolomé de La Serena; its founding date is for this reason sometimes listed as 1549. Second oldest European city in Chile.
1545	Potosí	Potosí	Bolivia	
1545	San Juan de los Remedios	Villa Clara Province	Cuba	Remedios has the most uncertain foundation date in Cuba, 1545 has been accepted because it is when the village erected its town hall, but its origin has been studied and documented back to 1513.
1545	Riohacha	La Guajira	Colombia	
1546	Santos	São Paulo	Brazil	
1546	Neyba	Bahoruco	Dominican Republic	
1546	Tepezalá	Aguascalientes	Mexico	
1547	Bertioga	São Paulo	Brazil	Colonization began in 1531 with Martim Afonso de Souza
1548	Asientos	Aguascalientes	Mexico	
1548	La Paz	La Paz	Bolivia	
1548	Pánuco	Zacatecas	Mexico	
1548	Zacatecas	Zacatecas	Mexico	
1549	Salvador	Bahia	Brazil	First capital of Brazil
1550	Concepción	Concepción	Chile	
1550	Valledupar	Cesar	Colombia	
1550	Ibagué	Tolima	Colombia	
1551	Vitória	Espírito Santo	Brazil	
1551	Mocoa	Putumayo	Colombia	
1552	Sonsonate	Sonsonate	El Salvador	
1553	Santiago del Estero	Santiago del Estero	Argentina	Oldest continuously inhabited European established settlement in Argentina.
1553	Santo André da Borda dos Campos de Piratininga	São Paulo	Brazil	First not coastal village in Brazil. Was abandoned because of war with natives.
1554	Embu das Artes	São Paulo	Brazil	
1554	São Paulo dos Campos de Piratininga/ São Paulo	São Paulo	Brazil	Current São Paulo state capital.
1555	Sain Alto	Zacatecas	Mexico	
1555	Valencia	Carabobo	Venezuela	
1556	Chalchihuites	Zacatecas	Mexico	
1557	Cuenca (Santa Ana de los Cuatro Rios de Cuenca)	Azuay	Ecuador	
1557	Santo Amaro	Bahia	Brazil	
1558	Mérida	Mérida	Venezuela	
1558	Londres	Catamarca	Argentina	Second oldest continuously inhabited European established settlement in Argentina, though rebuilt and relocated several times.
1560	Mogi das Cruzes	São Paulo	Brazil	
1560	Itaquaquecetuba	São Paulo	Brazil	
1560	Guarulhos	São Paulo	Brazil	
1560	Barueri	São Paulo	Brazil	
1560	Ipojuca	Pernambuco	Brazil	
1561	Santa Cruz de la Sierra	Santa Cruz	Bolivia	
1561	Mendoza	Mendoza	Argentina	
1561	San Cristobal	Táchira	Venezuela	
1562	San Juan	San Juan	Argentina	
1562	Río Grande	Zacatecas	Mexico	
1562	Susticacán	Zacatecas	Mexico	
1562	Itapecerica da Serra	São Paulo	Brazil	
1563	Cartago	Cartago	Costa Rica	Oldest continuously inhabited European established settlement in Costa Rica.
1564	São Mateus	Espírito Santo	Brazil	
1565	Rio de Janeiro	Rio de Janeiro	Brazil	Second capital of Brazil and capital of Rio de Janeiro state
1565	Saint Augustine	Florida	United States	Oldest continuously inhabited European established settlement in the continental United States (not counting Spanish settlements in Puerto Rico). Preceded only by Pensacola, Florida, which was destroyed in 1559, and Fort Caroline, destroyed in 1565.
1565	Tucumán	Tucumán	Argentina	
1567	Caracas	Capital District	Venezuela	
1568	Mazapil	Zacatecas	Mexico	
1568	Goiana	Pernambuco	Brazil	Declared vila in 1685; cidade in 1840.
1568	Valaparaíso	Zacatecas	Mexico	
1569	Santa Ana	Santa Ana	El Salvador	Built over Mayan city of Sihuatehuacán.
1570	Jerez	Zacatecas	Mexico	
1570	Sombrerete	Zacatecas	Mexico	
1571	Cochabamba	Cochabamba	Bolivia	
1572	Huancavelica	Huancavelica	Peru	
1573	San Germán	Puerto Rico	United States	Second oldest European settlement in Puerto Rico
1573	Córdoba	Córdoba	Argentina	
1573	Santa Fé	Santa Fé	Argentina	
1573	Buga	Valle del Cauca	Colombia	
1574	Huaraz	Ancash	Peru	
1574	Tarija	Tarija Department	Bolivia	
1575	Aguascalientes	Aguascalientes	Mexico	
1576	León	Guanajuato	Mexico	
1577	Juayúa	Sonsonate	El Salvador	
1578	Fort-Liberté	Nord-Est	Haiti	Originally called Bayaha by the Spanish. Oldest continuously inhabited European established settlement in Haiti.
1578	Tegucigalpa	Francisco Morazán	Honduras	
1579	Coamo	Puerto Rico	United States	Third oldest European settlement in Puerto Rico. In the same area where the Taínos had had their village of Guayama. Coamo became officially a town in 1616, and given the title of villa by Spanish Royal Decree in 1778.
1580	Buenos Aires		Argentina	
1580	Carapicuíba	São Paulo	Brazil	
1580	Santana de Parnaíba	São Paulo	Brazil	
1580	Santo Domingo Xenacoj	Sacatepéquez	Guatemala	
1582	Salta	Salta	Argentina	
1583	St. John's	Newfoundland and Labrador	Canada	Oldest continuously inhabited British settlement in the Americas.
1584	Roanoke	North Carolina	United States	
1585	João Pessoa	Paraíba	Brazil	
1587	Concepción del Oro	Zacatecas	Mexico	
1588	Corrientes	Corrientes	Argentina	
1590	São Cristóvão	Sergipe	Brazil	First capital of Sergipe. Formerly known as Sergipe d'El Rei
1591	Jiménez del Teul	Zacatecas	Mexico	
1591	Juan Aldama	Zacatecas	Mexico	
1591	Paudalho	Pernambuco	Brazil	
1591	La Rioja	La Rioja	Argentina	
1592	San Luis Potosí	San Luis Potosí	Mexico	
1593	Angra dos Reys	Rio de Janeiro	Brazil	First settlers arrived in 1502
1593	San Salvador de Jujuy	Jujuy	Argentina	
1594	Pinos	Zacatecas	Mexico	
1594	San Luis	San Luis	Argentina	
1596	Monterrey	Nuevo León	Mexico	
1596	Villahermosa	Tabasco	Mexico	Originally called Villa Felipe II.
1597	Portobelo	Colón	Panama	
1598	Parras	Coahuila	Mexico	
1599	Natal	Rio Grande do Norte	Brazil	
1599	Tadoussac	Quebec	Canada	Oldest continuously inhabited French established settlement in the Americas, oldest European established settlement in Quebec.
1600	Facatativá	Cundinamarca	Colombia	
1600	Zipaquirá	Cundinamarca	Colombia	
1602	David	Chiriquí Province	Panama	
1603	Salamanca	Guanajuato	Mexico	
1605	Port Royal	Nova Scotia	Canada	Oldest continuously inhabited European established settlement in Nova Scotia.
1606	Bayaguana	Monte Plata	Dominican Republic	
1606	Ibarra	Imbabura	Ecuador	
1606	Oruro	Oruro	Bolivia	
1607	Jamestown	Virginia	United States	First permanent English established settlement in the Americas.
1608	Quebec City	Quebec	Canada	
1609	Fortaleza	Ceará	Brazil	
1610	Itu	São Paulo	Brazil	
1610	Kecoughtan	Virginia	United States	
1524	León	León	Nicaragua	Original location (now known as the ruins of Leon Viejo) on the south-western shore of Lago Managua founded in 1524, but destroyed by earthquakes, and resettled 20 miles west, in 1610, to its present-day location at Leon.
1610	Santa Fe	New Mexico	United States	Oldest continuously inhabited state or territorial capital in the continental United States.
1610	Harbour Grace	Newfoundland and Labrador	Canada	
1611	Marechal Deodoro	Alagoas	Brazil	
1612	São Luís	Maranhão	Brazil	Capital of Maranhão.
1612	St. George's	St. George's Parish	Bermuda	Oldest continuously inhabited English established settlement in the Americas.
1612	Neiva	Huila	Colombia	
1613	Penedo	Alagoas	Brazil	
1613	Hopewell	Virginia	United States	Oldest continuously inhabited English settlement in North America. Founded in 1613 as Bermuda City by Thomas Dale.
1614	Albany	New York	United States	Oldest US settlement north of Virginia and second oldest state or territorial capital in the continental United States, incorporated 1686
1614	Sirinhaém	Pernambuco	Brazil	Declared vila in 1627; cidade in 1892.
1615	Cabo Frio	Rio de Janeiro	Brazil	
1615	Taos	New Mexico	United States	
1615	Ipiales	Nariño	Colombia	
1616	Belém	Pará	Brazil	Capital of Pará.
1616	Medellín	Antioquia	Colombia	Founded by Francisco de Herrera y Campuzano
1616	Arecibo	Puerto Rico	United States	
1618	Cabo de Santo Agostinho	Pernambuco	Brazil	Declared vila in 1811; cidade in 1877.
1620	Ojocaliente	Zacatecas	Mexico	
1620	Plymouth	Massachusetts	United States	
1622	Bucaramanga	Santander	Colombia	
1623	Dover	New Hampshire	United States	
1623	Gloucester	Massachusetts	United States	
1624	Old Road	Saint Christopher	Saint Kitts and Nevis	Oldest continuously inhabited British established settlement in the Caribbean, First successful 'non-Spanish' established settlement in the Caribbean.
1624	Villa Soriano	Soriano	Uruguay	Oldest continuously inhabited European established settlement in Uruguay.
1624	New Amsterdam	New York	United States	Now New York City.
1625	Quincy	Massachusetts	United States	
1626	Salem	Massachusetts	United States	
1626	Vitória de Santo Antão	Pernambuco	Brazil	Declared vila in 1811; cidade in 1843.
1627	Basseterre	Saint Christopher	Saint Kitts and Nevis	Oldest continuously inhabited French established settlement in the Caribbean.
1628	Bridgetown	Saint Michael	Barbados	Second oldest continuously inhabited English established settlement in the Caribbean.
1630	Boston	Massachusetts	United States	
1630	Jersey City, New Jersey	New Jersey	United States	Pavonia, New Netherland
1630	Paramaribo	Paramaribo	Suriname	Oldest continuously inhabited European established settlement in Suriname.
1630	Speightstown	Saint Peter	Barbados	
1631	Biddeford	Maine	United States	
1631	Hidalgo del Parral	Chihuahua	Mexico	
1631	Saint John	New Brunswick	Canada	
1632	Batopilas	Chihuahua	Mexico	
1632	Williamsburg	Virginia	United States	
1632	St. John's	Antigua	Antigua and Barbuda	
1634	Green Bay	Wisconsin	United States	Oldest continuously inhabited French established settlement in the United States.
1634	St. Mary's City	Maryland	United States	
1634	Trois-Rivières	Quebec	Canada	
1634	Willemstad	Curaçao	Netherlands	Oldest continuously inhabited Dutch established settlement in the Caribbean.
1635	Concord	Massachusetts	United States	
1635	Dedham	Massachusetts	United States	
1635	Newburyport	Massachusetts	United States	
1635	Old Saybrook	Connecticut	United States	Original Dutch settlement called Kievits Hoek.
1635	Hartford	Connecticut	United States	Settled by Dutch in 1635. Named Newton by English in 1636, then changed to Hartford in 1637.
1636	Scituate	Massachusetts	United States	
1636	Springfield	Massachusetts	United States	
1636	Providence	Rhode Island	United States	
1638	Belize City	Belize	Belize	Oldest continuously inhabited European established settlement in Belize. Original Mayan city called Holzuz.
1638	Fort-de-France		Martinique	Originally called Fort Saint Louis.
1638	New Haven	Connecticut	United States	
1638	Wilmington	Delaware	United States	Grew from Fort Christina, part of the New Sweden colony. Oldest continuously inhabited Swedish established settlement in the Americas.
1638	Cambridge	Massachusetts	United States	
1639	Rincón de Romos	Aguascalientes	Mexico	
1639 (prior to)	St. Marks	Florida	United States	
1639	Barnstable	Massachusetts	United States	Second-oldest municipality and only city on Cape Cod
1639	Bridgeport	Connecticut	United States	
1639	Guilford	Connecticut	United States	Location of the Henry Whitfield House, the oldest house in Connecticut and the oldest stone house in New England
1639	Milford	Connecticut	United States	
1639	Newport	Rhode Island	United States	
1640	Tumaco	Nariño	Colombia	
1642	Montreal	Quebec	Canada	
1642	Lexington	Massachusetts	United States	
1642	Warwick	Rhode Island	United States	
1642	Sorel-Tracy	Quebec	Canada	
1643	Basse-Terre	Guadeloupe	France	Territorial capital.
1643	Dolores Hidalgo	Guanajuato	Mexico	
1644	Salvatierra	Guanajuato	Mexico	
1646	New London	Connecticut	United States	
1648	Alcântara	Maranhão	Brazil	
1648	Paranaguá	Paraná	Brazil	
1649	Annapolis	Maryland	United States	
1650	Castries	Castries	Saint Lucia	
1650	Saint George's	Saint George	Grenada	
1651	Norwalk	Connecticut	United States	
1654	Vieux Fort	Vieux Fort	Saint Lucia	
1654	Sorocaba	São Paulo (state)	Brazil	Old village of Nossa Senhora do Mont Serrat
1659	Ciudad Juárez	Chihuahua	Mexico	
1659	El Paso	Texas	United States	
1660	Charlestown	Nevis	St Kitts & Nevis	
1660	Placentia	Newfoundland and Labrador	Canada	French Capital until 1713, originally called Plaisance
1660	Rye	New York	United States	
1664	Cayenne	French Guiana	France	Oldest continuously inhabited European established settlement in French Guiana.
1664	Quibdó	Chocó	Colombia	
1664	Woodbridge	New Jersey	United States	
1665	Port-de-Paix	Nord-Ouest	Haiti	
1666	Codrington	Barbuda	Antigua and Barbuda	
1666	Newark	New Jersey	United States	
1667	Paraty	Rio de Janeiro	Brazil	
1668	Sault Ste. Marie	Michigan	United States	, oldest city in Michigan.
1669	Manaus	Amazonas	Brazil	
1670	Boqueirão	Paraíba	Brazil	
1670	Cap-Haïtien	Nord	Haiti	Originally called "Cap-Français"
1670	Charleston	South Carolina	United States	
1670	Mackinac Island	Michigan	United States	
1671	St. Ignace	Michigan	United States	
1672	Charlotte Amalie, St. Thomas	U.S. Virgin Islands	United States	Oldest permanent European settlement in Saint Thomas island. Oldest continuously inhabited Danish established settlement in the Americas.
1673	Kingston	Ontario	Canada	Grew from Fort Frontenac. Continuously inhabited since 1784.
1673	Panama City	Panamá	Panama	Oldest continuously inhabited capital of Panama. Founded in 1673 as the capital of Panama, today Casco Viejo, after the original settlement, today Panamá Viejo, was sacked and destroyed by the Welsh pirate Henry Morgan in 1671.
1673	San José de Gracia	Aguascalientes	Mexico	
1673	Worcester	Massachusetts	United States	
1674	Cachoeira	Bahia	Brazil	
1674	Waterbury	Connecticut	United States	
1676	Laguna	Santa Catarina	Brazil	
1677	Crosswicks	New Jersey	United States	Quaker settlement. Continuously inhabited since founding.
1680	South Orange	New Jersey	United States	Grew from Newark (later Orange).
1680	Colonia del Sacramento	Colonia	Uruguay	
1681	Cockburn Town		Turks and Caicos Islands	
1681	Philadelphia	Pennsylvania	United States	
1682	Norfolk	Virginia	United States	
1682	São Borja	Rio Grande do Sul	Brazil	
1683	Dover	Delaware	United States	
1683	White Plains	New York	United States	
1685	Escada	Pernambuco	Brazil	
1686	Trinidad	Beni Department	Bolivia	
1687	New Britain	Connecticut	United States	
1687	São Luiz Gonzaga	Rio Grande do Sul	Brazil	
1687	São Miguel das Missões	Rio Grande do Sul	Brazil	
1687	São Nicolau	Rio Grande do Sul	Brazil	
1689	Marigot		Saint Martin	
1689	San Gil	Santander	Colombia	
1690	Port of Spain	Trinidad	Trinidad and Tobago	
1690	São Lourenço das Missões	Rio Grande do Sul	Brazil	
1690	Santa Rosa de Viterbo	Boyacá	Colombia	
1691	Peoria	Illinois	United States	
1692	Villanueva	Zacatecas	Mexico	
1693	Bom Jesus da Lapa	Bahia	Brazil	
1693	Burlington	New Jersey	United States	
1693	Middletown	New Jersey	United States	
1693	Curitiba	Paraná	Brazil	
1693	Kingston	Kingston Parish, St Andrew Parish	Jamaica	
1695	Nassau	New Providence	Bahamas	
1695	Saint-Marc	Artibonite	Haiti	
1696	Assú	Rio Grande do Norte	Brazil	Declared vila in 1766; cidade in 1845.
1696	Rimouski	Quebec	Canada	
1697	Wendake	Quebec	Canada	
1698	Ambato	Tungurahua	Ecuador	
1698	Pensacola	Florida	United States	Known for being the first European settlement in North America.
1698	Jacmel	Sud-Est	Haiti	Known for being the first city with electricity in the Caribbean.
1699	Baton Rouge	Louisiana	United States	
1700	Barreiras	Bahia	Brazil	
1701	Detroit	Michigan	United States	
1702	Jesús María	Aguascalientes	Mexico	
1702	Mobile	Alabama	United States	
1703	Kaskaskia	Illinois	United States	
1705	Bath	North Carolina	United States	
1706	Albuquerque	New Mexico	United States	
1706	Santo Ângelo	Rio Grande do Sul	Brazil	
1709	Chihuahua	Chihuahua	Mexico	
1710	Chatham	New Jersey	United States	On land purchased in 1680.
1710	New Bern	North Carolina	United States	Birthplace of Pepsi
1711	Beaufort	South Carolina	United States	
1711	Ouro Preto	Minas Gerais	Brazil	
1715	Mackinaw City	Michigan	United States	Founded by the French as Fort Michilimackinac.
1714	Natchitoches	Louisiana	United States	Oldest settlement in the Louisiana Purchase
1714	Antonina	Paraná	Brazil	
1715 (prior to)	Kekionga	Indiana	United States	Capital of the Miami tribe.
1716	Natchez	Mississippi	United States	Dates to the founding of Fort Rosalie by the French.
1717	Brejo do Cruz	Paraíba	Brazil	
1717	Zacatecas	Zacatecas	Mexico	
1673	Dunstable	Massachusetts	United States	
1717	Westborough	Massachusetts	United States	One Hundredth Town in Massachusetts
1718	New Orleans	Louisiana	United States	
1718	Rio de Contas	Bahia	Brazil	
1718	San Antonio	Texas	United States	
1718	Tiradentes	Minas Gerais	Brazil	
1719	Trenton	New Jersey	United States	
1721	Cortazar	Guanajuato	Mexico	
1722	Edenton	North Carolina	United States	
1723	Guaynabo	Puerto Rico	United States	Declared pueblo in 1723; municipio in 1768.
1724	Brattleboro	Vermont	United States	Grew out of Fort Dummer.
1725	Concord	New Hampshire	United States	
1726	Florianópolis	Santa Catarina	Brazil	
1726	Montevideo	Montevideo	Uruguay	
1727	Cuiabá	Mato Grosso	Brazil	
1727	Goiás	Goiás	Brazil	
1727	Pirenópolis	Goiás	Brazil	
1728	Fredericksburg	Virginia	United States	
1728	Inhambupe	Bahia	Brazil	
1728	Nuuk		Greenland	Norse colony was originally called Godthab. Oldest continuously inhabited European established settlement in Greenland.
1729	Baltimore	Maryland	United States	
1730	Roseau	Saint George	Dominica	
1732	Fredericton	New Brunswick	Canada	Originally called Ste. Anne's Point.
1732	Vincennes	Indiana	United States	
1733	Morretes	Paraná	Brazil	
1733	Pau dos Ferros	Rio Grande do Norte	Brazil	
1733	Richmond	Virginia	United States	
1733	Savannah	Georgia	United States	
1733	Cúcuta	Norte de Santander	Colombia	
1736	Augusta	Georgia	United States	
1737	Rio Grande	Rio Grande do Sul	Brazil	
1738	Fort Rouge	Manitoba	Canada	Now Winnipeg, Manitoba.
1738	San José	San José	Costa Rica	
1740	Santa Rosalía de Camargo	Chihuahua	Mexico	
1740	Portalegre	Rio Grande do Norte	Brazil	
1740	San Felipe de Puerto Plata	Puerto Plata	Dominican Republic	
1741	Viamão	Rio Grande do Sul	Brazil	
1743	Canguaretama	Rio Grande do Norte	Brazil	Declared vila in 1858; cidade in 1885.
1748	Caicó	Rio Grande do Norte	Brazil	Declared vila in 1788; cidade in 1868.
1749	Alexandria	Virginia	United States	
1749	San Ignacio de Velasco	Santa Cruz Department	Bolivia	
1749	Port-au-Prince	Ouest	Haiti	
1749	Halifax	Nova Scotia	Canada	
1749	Windsor	Ontario	Canada	Oldest continually-inhabited settlement in Canada west of Montreal
1751	Manchester	New Hampshire	United States	Former American textile capital - Named after Manchester, England
1752	Buíque	Pernambuco	Brazil	
1752	Patos	Paraíba	Brazil	Declared vila in 1832; cidade in 1903.
1752	Tubac	Arizona	United States	
1754	Augusta	Maine	United States	
1755	Charlotte	North Carolina	United States	
1756	Salto	Salto	Uruguay	
1756	Santa Bárbara de Samaná	Samaná	Dominican Republic	
1756	Yauco	Puerto Rico	United States	
1757	Estância	Sergipe	Brazil	
1758	Pittsburgh	Pennsylvania	United States	
1758	Macapá	Amapá	Brazil	
1760	Arês	Rio Grande do Norte	Brazil	
1760	Sabana de la Mar	Hato Mayor	Dominican Republic	
1761	Sacaba	Cochabamba Department	Bolivia	
1762	Kingstown	St Vincent	Saint Vincent and the Grenadines	
1762	Parnaíba	Piauí	Brazil	
1762	Shepherdstown	West Virginia	United States	Originally known as Mecklenburg.
1762	Allentown	Pennsylvania	United States	Incorporated as Northamptontown.
1762	Baía da Traição	Paraíba	Brazil	
1763	Burlington	Vermont	United States	
1763	Pánfilo Natera	Zacatecas	Mexico	
1763	Ellsworth	Maine	United States	
1763	Philipsburg	Sint Maarten	Netherlands	
1763	St. Louis	Missouri	United States	
1764	Charlottetown	Prince Edward Island	Canada	
1764	Pointe-à-Pitre	Grand Terre	Guadeloupe	
1765	Port Elizabeth	Grenadines	Saint Vincent and the Grenadines	
1765	Portsmouth	Saint John	Dominica	
1766	Moncton	New Brunswick	Canada	
1767	Ceará-Mirim	Rio Grande do Norte	Brazil	
1767	Araioses	Maranhão	Brazil	
1768	Toms River	New Jersey	United States	
1769	Elizabethton	Tennessee	United States	The first independent American government (known as the Watauga Association, created in 1772) located west of both the Eastern Continental Divide and the original Thirteen Colonies.
1769	Falmouth	Trelawny	Jamaica	
1769	San Diego	California	United States	Grew from Presidio of San Diego
1769	Lapa	Paraná	Brazil	
1770	Monterey	California	United States	Grew from Presidio of Monterey. Original capital of California
1770	Araxá	Minas Gerais	Brazil	
1771	Calvillo	Aguascalientes	Mexico	
1772	Porto Alegre	Rio Grande do Sul	Brazil	
1775	Tucson	Arizona	United States	
1774	Castro	Paraná	Brazil	
1775	Lexington	Kentucky	United States	
1775	Boonesborough	Kentucky	United States	Grew from Fort Boonesborough, built by pioneer Daniel Boone. -
1775	São Lourenço da Mata	Pernambuco	Brazil	District status in 1775; village status in 1884; municipality status in 1890
1776	San Francisco	California	United States	Founded as a Presidio (military settlement). The first civilian settler, William A. Richardson, arrived in 1822.
1776	Sincelejo	Sucre	Colombia	
1777	San Jose	California	United States	Originally known as El Pueblo de San José de Guadalupe, the first town in the Spanish colony of Nueva California, which later became Alta California.
1777	Montería	Cordoba	Colombia	
1778	Corumbá	Mato Grosso do Sul	Brazil	
1778	Louisville	Kentucky	United States	Grew from Fort Nelson, established by explorer George Rogers Clark.
1778	San Francisco de Macorís	Duarte	Dominican Republic	
1779	Jonesborough	Tennessee	United States	Later organized as the lost State of Franklin with Jonesborough as capital 1784.
1779	Nashville	Tennessee	United States	Grew from Fort Nashborough
1780	Codó	Maranhão	Brazil	Declared vila in 1833; cidade in 1896.
1780	Las Matas de Farfán	San Juan	Dominican Republic	
1780	Arauca	Arauca	Colombia	
1781	Montpelier	Vermont	United States	
1781	Los Angeles	California	United States	Originally known as El Pueblo de Nuestra Señora la Reina de los Ángeles.
1782	Ventura	California	United States	Originally known as City of San Buenaventura.
1782	Catu	Bahia	Brazil	
1782	Georgetown	Demerara-Mahaica	Guyana	Originally called La Nouvelle Ville.
1783	Vitória da Conquista	Bahia	Brazil	
1784	San Fernando	Trinidad	Trinidad and Tobago	
1785	Harrisburg	Pennsylvania	United States	
1785	North Battleford	Saskatchewan	Canada	1785 fur trading post. 1877 Battleford is capital of the North West Territories. North Battleford incorporated as a city (population 5000+) 1913.
1785	Asheville	North Carolina	United States	
1785	Gustavia		Saint Barthélemy	
1785	Huntington	West Virginia	United States	
1785	Sydney	Nova Scotia	Canada	
1786	Columbia	South Carolina	United States	
1786	Escada	Pernambuco	Brazil	Declared vila in 1854; cidade in 1873.
1786	Florissant	Missouri	United States	Originally known as St. Ferdinand.
1786	Frankfort	Kentucky	United States	
1786	Portland	Maine	United States	
1787	Boa Ventura	Paraíba	Brazil	
1788	Marietta	Ohio	United States	
1788	Cincinnati	Ohio	United States	
1788	Charleston	West Virginia	United States	Grew from Fort Lee.
1788	Mercedes	Soriano	Uruguay	
1789	Buffalo	New York	United States	
1789	Itambé, Bahia	Pernambuco	Brazil	Declared vila in 1867; cidade in 1879.
1790	Hamilton	Pembroke Parish	Bermuda	
1790	Washington	District of Columbia	United States	
1791	Knoxville	Tennessee	United States	
1791	Bangor	Maine	United States	
1792	Raleigh	North Carolina	United States	
1793	Sherbrooke	Quebec	Canada	
1793	Toronto	Ontario	Canada	
1794	Fort Wayne	Indiana	United States	
1795	Edmonton	Alberta	Canada	Grew from Fort Edmonton.
1795	Erie	Pennsylvania	United States	Grew from the French Fort Presque Isle.
1795	Maryville	Tennessee	United States	Grew from the American Fort Craig.
1796	Cleveland	Ohio	United States	
1796	Oranjestad	Aruba	Netherlands	
1797	Chaguanas	Trinidad	Trinidad and Tobago	
1797	Franklinton	Ohio	United States	Eventually absorbed by Columbus, Ohio.
1799	Araruama	Rio de Janeiro	Brazil	
1800	Hull	Quebec	Canada	Formerly known as Wrightville.
1800	Sonsón	Antioquia	Colombia	
1802	Chapadinha	Maranhão	Brazil	
1802	Santa Cruz de Barahona	Barahona	Dominican Republic	
1803	Chicago	Illinois	United States	Grew from Fort Dearborn.
1805	Huntsville	Alabama	United States	
1807	Hot Springs	Arkansas	United States	
1809	Água Preta	Pernambuco	Brazil	Declared vila in 1846; cidade in 1895.
1810	Guarapuava	Paraná	Brazil	
1810	Manchester	New Hampshire	United States	
1810	Pilão Arcado	Bahia	Brazil	
1810	San Bernardino	California	United States	
1811	Garanhuns	Pernambuco	Brazil	
1811	Astoria	Oregon	United States	
1812	Columbus	Ohio	United States	
1812	Pelotas	Rio Grande do Sul	Brazil	Declared vila in 1832; cidade in 1835.
1813	Capela	Sergipe	Brazil	
1813	Chisec	Alta Verapaz	Guatemala	
1813	Barranquilla	Atlántico	Colombia	
1815	Areia	Paraíba	Brazil	
1815	Hamilton	Ontario	Canada	
1816	Alagoinhas	Bahia	Brazil	
1816	Chattanooga	Tennessee	United States	Originally named Ross's Landing.
1816	Saginaw	Michigan	United States	
1816	Savaneta	Aruba	Netherlands	
1817	Fort Smith	Arkansas	United States	
1818	Itaguaí	Rio de Janeiro	Brazil	
1819	Montgomery	Alabama	United States	Near the site of the earlier French Fort Toulouse.
1819	Springfield	Illinois	United States	
1819	Managua	Managua	Nicaragua	
1819	Memphis	Tennessee	United States	Near the site of the earlier French Fort Prudhomme.
1819	Flint	Michigan	United States	
1819	Palmeira	Paraná	Brazil	
1819	Tuscaloosa	Alabama	United States	Former state capital, grew from former Native American settlements beginning in 1580.
1820	Cotegipe	Bahia	Brazil	
1821	Little Rock	Arkansas	United States	
1821	Indianapolis	Indiana	United States	
1821	Jefferson City	Missouri	United States	
1821	Decatur	Alabama	United States	
1822	Jacksonville	Florida	United States	Known as "Cowford".
1822	Ponta Grossa	Paraná	Brazil	
1822	Jackson	Mississippi	United States	
1823	Tampa	Florida	United States	Grew from earlier military post Fort Brooke.
1824	Vancouver	Washington	United States	
1824	Tallahassee	Florida	United States	
1825	Vicksburg	Mississippi	United States	
1825	Grand Rapids	Michigan	United States	
1825	Syracuse	New York	United States	incorporated as village; received city charter in 1847
1826	Ipiranga	Paraná	Brazil	
1826	London	Ontario	Canada	
1826	Bytown	Ontario	Canada	Now Ottawa, Ontario.
1827	Fort Leavenworth	Kansas	United States	
1827	St. Andrews	Florida	United States	Now part of Panama City
1828	Key West	Florida	United States	
1831	Greenville	South Carolina	United States	
1831	Piracanjuba	Goiás	Brazil	
1832	Goianinha	Rio Grande do Norte	Brazil	
1832	Touros	Rio Grande do Norte	Brazil	
1833	Bananeiras	Paraíba	Brazil	
1833	Juazeiro	Bahia	Brazil	
1833	Kitchener	Ontario	Canada	Originally called Berlin.
1833	Milwaukee	Wisconsin	United States	
1833	Nazaré da Mata	Pernambuco	Brazil	Declared vila in 1833; cidade in 1850.
1833	Rio Formoso	Pernambuco	Brazil	Declared vila in 1833; cidade in 1850.
1833	Vassouras	Rio de Janeiro	Brazil	
1833	Toledo	Ohio	United States	Named after Toledo, Spain
1835	Austin	Texas	United States	
1835	Barra do Corda	Maranhão	Brazil	
1835	Curupuru	Maranhão	Brazil	Declared vila in 1841; cidade in 1920.
1836	Davenport	Iowa	United States	
1836	Oshawa	Ontario	Canada	
1836	Shreveport	Louisiana	United States	
1836	Madison	Wisconsin	United States	
1836	Tulsa	Oklahoma	United States	The Lochapoka named their new settlement "Tulasi," meaning "old town"
1837	Glória do Goitá	Pernambuco	Brazil	Declared vila in 1877; cidade in 1884.
1837	Lansing	Michigan	United States	
1837	Houston	Texas	United States	
1838	Divina Pastora	Sergipe	Brazil	
1838	Diamantina	Minas Gerais	Brazil	The original village was established in 1713 and became a city on 6 March 1838
1838	Sabará	Minas Gerais	Brazil	The original village was established in 1675 and became a city on 6 March 1838
1838	São João Del Rey	Minas Gerais	Brazil	The original village was established in 1700 and became a city on 6 March 1838
1838	Serro	Minas Gerais	Brazil	The original village was established in 1701 and became a city on 6 March 1838
1838	Kansas City	Missouri	United States	
1838	St Paul	Minnesota	United States	
1839	Santa Rita	Paraíba	Brazil	Declared vila in 1890; cidade in 1924.
1840	Summerside	Prince Edward Island	Canada	
1840	Villavicencio	Meta	Colombia	
1841	Cedar Rapids	Iowa	United States	
1841	Dallas	Texas	United States	
1842	Piatã	Bahia	Brazil	
1842	Salem	Oregon	United States	
1843	Atlanta	Georgia	United States	Originally known as Terminus, later renamed Marthasville. Acquired the name Atlanta in 1847.
1843	Des Moines	Iowa	United States	
1843	Stanley	East Falkland	Falkland Islands	
1843	Uruguaiana	Rio Grande do Sul	Brazil	Declared vila in 1846; cidade in 1874.
1843	Victoria	British Columbia	Canada	
1844	Lençóis	Bahia	Brazil	
1845	Araruna	Paraíba	Brazil	
1845	Portland	Oregon	United States	
1847	Alagoa Grande	Paraíba	Brazil	Declared vila in 1865; cidade in 1908.
1847	Salt Lake City	Utah	United States	Originally known as Great Salt Lake City.
1848	Caruaru	Pernambuco	Brazil	First municipality in the [Agreste] region of Pernambuco state, Brazil.
1848	Rio Verde	Goiás	Brazil	
1848	Sacramento	California	United States	
1849	Stockton	California	United States	
1849	Provo	Utah	United States	
1849	Manizales	Caldas	Colombia	
1851	San Luis	Colorado	United States	
1851	Seattle	Washington	United States	
1851	Jericó	Antioquia	Colombia	
1852	Mossoró	Rio Grande do Norte	Brazil	
1852	São José dos Pinhais	Paraná	Brazil	
1852	Colón	Colón	Panama	
1853	Olympia	Washington	United States	
1854	Omaha	Nebraska	United States	
1854	Anajatuba	Maranhão	Brazil	
1854	Topeka	Kansas	United States	
1855	Aracaju	Sergipe	Brazil	
1856	Lincoln	Nebraska	United States	Originally called Lancaster.
1856	O'Fallon	Missouri	United States	
1856	Sioux Falls	South Dakota	United States	
1857	Boquim	Sergipe	Brazil	
1858	Carson City	Nevada	United States	
1858	Denver	Colorado	United States	
1859	Yankton	South Dakota	United States	
1860	Chico	California	United States	
1863	Boise	Idaho	United States	
1863	Pereira	Risaralda	Colombia	
1863	Wichita	Kansas	United States	
1864	Casper	Wyoming	United States	Originally called Platte Bridge Station.
1864	Helena	Montana	United States	
1864	Salinas	California	United States	
1866	Prince Albert	Saskatchewan	Canada	Settled by Rev. James Nisbet. Incorporated as city (population 5000+) October 8, 1904
1867	Cheyenne	Wyoming	United States	
1867	Gameleira	Pernambuco	Brazil	
1867	Minneapolis	Minnesota	United States	
1867	Vancouver	British Columbia	Canada	Originally called Gastown.
1868	Colinas	Maranhão	Brazil	Declared vila in 1870; cidade in 1891.
1868	Phoenix	Arizona	United States	
1870	Afogados da Ingazeira	Pernambuco	Brazil	
1870	Petrolina	Pernambuco	Brazil	
1870	Campo Largo	Paraná	Brazil	
1870	Puerto Limon	Limon	Costa Rica	
1870	Wichita	Kansas	United States	
1871	Águas Belas	Pernambuco	Brazil	
1871	Alto Parnaíba	Maranhão	Brazil	
1871	Birmingham	Alabama	United States	
1871	Colorado Springs	Colorado	United States	
1871	Fargo	North Dakota	United States	
1871	Imbituva	Paraná	Brazil	
1871	São João do Triunfo	Paraná	Brazil	
1872	Anniston	Alabama	United States	
1872	Bismarck	North Dakota	United States	
1872	Tibagi	Paraná	Brazil	
1873	Jaboatão dos Guararapes	Pernambuco	Brazil	First settlement in 1593; village status in 1873; city status in 1884
1873	Timbaúba	Pernambuco	Brazil	Declared vila in 1879; cidade in 1884.
1875	Orlando	Florida	United States	
1875	Calgary	Alberta	Canada	Grew from Fort Calgary
1875	Humboldt	Saskatchewan	Canada	Incorporated as a city (population 5000+) November 7, 2000
1876	Boa Vista	Paraíba	Brazil	
1876	Cajapió	Maranhão	Brazil	
1876	Rapid City	South Dakota	United States	
1877	Billings	Montana	United States	
1877	Jaquimeyes	Barahona	Dominican Republic	
1878	Coeur d'Alene	Idaho	United States	
1878	Colombo	Paraná	Brazil	
1879	Vicência	Pernambuco	Brazil	Declared vila in 1891; cidade in 1928.
1880	Pierre	South Dakota	United States	
1881	Juneau	Alaska	United States	
1881	Moose Jaw	Saskatchewan	Canada	Incorporated as a city (population 5000+) November 1903.
1882	Brandon	Manitoba	Canada	
1882	Mao	Valverde	Dominican Republic	
1882	Restauración	Dajabón	Dominican Republic	
1882	Yorkton	Saskatchewan	Canada	The York Farmers’ Colonization Company Limited settlement May 12, 1882. City (population 5000+) incorporated February 1, 1928.
1882	Swift Current	Saskatchewan	Canada	Canadian Pacific Railway arrival December 10, 1882. City (population 5000+) incorporated January 15, 1914.
1882	Regina	Saskatchewan	Canada	Settlement first named Pile O' Bones, and renamed Regina. Capital city of SK. Incorporated as a city (population 5000+) June 19, 1903
1882	Rio Branco	Acre	Brazil	
1883	Saskatoon	Saskatchewan	Canada	Temperance Colony founded at Nutana. Riversdale, Nutana, and Saskatoon incorporated as a city (population 5000+) in 1906.
1884	Melfort	Saskatchewan	Canada	Stoney Creek Settlement began in 1884. Incorporated as a city (population 5000+) on July 1, 1907.
1887	Gulfport	Mississippi	United States	
1888	Virginia Beach	Virginia	United States	Grew from Seatack community.
1889	Oklahoma City	Oklahoma	United States	
1889	Whiting	Indiana	United States	
1890	Ijuí	Rio Grande do Sul	Brazil	
1892	Aliança	Pernambuco	Brazil	Declared vila in 1909; cidade in 1928.
1892	Catende	Pernambuco	Brazil	Created in 1892 as a district of Palmares. Autonomous municipality in 1909.
1892	Estevan	Saskatchewan	Canada	CPR arrives 1893. Incorporated as city (population 5000+) March 1, 1957
1892	Guayaramerín	Beni	Bolivia	
1892	Vernon	British Columbia	Canada	
1893	Araripina	Pernambuco	Brazil	Created in 1893 as a district of Ouricuri. Autonomous municipality in 1928.
1893	Catuípe	Rio Grande do Sul	Brazil	
1894	Riberalta	Beni	Bolivia	
1895	Traverse City	Michigan	United States	
1896	Condado	Pernambuco	Brazil	Declared cidade in 1958.
1896	Inhumas	Goiás	Brazil	
1896	Miami	Florida	United States	
1896	Santa Catalina la Tinta	Alta Verapaz	Guatemala	
1897	Jequié	Bahia	Brazil	
1897	Nelson	British Columbia	Canada	
1898	Weyburn	Saskatchewan	Canada	Signal Hill settlement. Weyburn incorporated as a city (population 5000+) 1913.
1898	Chetumal	Quintana Roo	Mexico	Originally called Payo Obispo.
1899	Porto Acre	Acre	Brazil	
1900	Afrânio	Pernambuco	Brazil	Created in 1900 as a district of Petrolina. Autonomous municipality in 1963.
1901	Fairbanks	Alaska	United States	
1902	Florencia	Caquetá	Colombia	
1903	Lloydminster	Saskatchewan	Canada	Brittania colony settled by Rev. Exton Lloyd and Rev. Isaac Barr. Incorporated as a city (population 5000+) in 1958.
1904	Cruzeiro do Sul	Acre	Brazil	
1904	Grytviken		South Georgia	
1904	Sena Madureira	Acre	Brazil	
1904	Xapuri	Acre	Brazil	
1905	Las Vegas	Nevada	United States	
1906	Cobija	Pando	Bolivia	
1906	Feijó	Acre	Brazil	
1907	Melville	Saskatchewan	Canada	Incorporated as a city (population 5000+) August 1, 1960
1907	Tarauacá	Acre	Brazil	
1908	São Mateus do Sul	Paraná	Brazil	
1909	Estreito	Maranhão	Brazil	
1910	Brasiléia	Acre	Brazil	
1910	Kindersley	Saskatchewan	Canada	
1910	Porto Walter	Acre	Brazil	
1910	Villazón	Potosí	Bolivia	
1914	Anchorage	Alaska	United States	
1915	Yopal	Casanare	Colombia	
1928	Leticia	Amazonas	Colombia	
1929	Pabellón de Arteaga	Aguascalientes	Mexico	
1930	Puerto Carreño	Vichada	Colombia	
1931	Loreto	Zacatecas	Mexico	
1933	Delicias	Chihuahua	Mexico	
1935	Yellowknife	Northwest Territories	Canada	
1935	Mitú	Vaupés	Colombia	
1938	San José del Guaviare	Guaviare	Colombia	
1942	Iqaluit	Nunavut	Canada	Originally called Frobisher Bay.
1955	Freeport	Grand Bahama	Bahamas	
1957	Ciudad del Este	Alto Paraná	Paraguay	Originally called Puerto Flor de Lis.
1957	Rankin Inlet	Nunavut	Canada	
1960	Brasília	Distrito Federal	Brazil	Created in 1960 as the national capital.
1970	Belmopan	Cayo	Belize	
1970	Linden	Upper Demerara-Berbice	Guyana	City formed by combining the towns of Christianburg, MacKenzie, and Wismar.
1970	Cancún	Quintana Roo	Mexico	Development of the area as a resort was started on April 20, 1970
1974	Inírida	Guainía	Colombia	
1989	Palmas	Tocantins	Brazil	Founded one year after the creation of the State of Tocantins.

== See also ==
- European colonization of the Americas
- List of oldest continuously inhabited cities
