= Itambé, Pernambuco =

Municipality of Pernambuco, Brazil

Itambé
- City
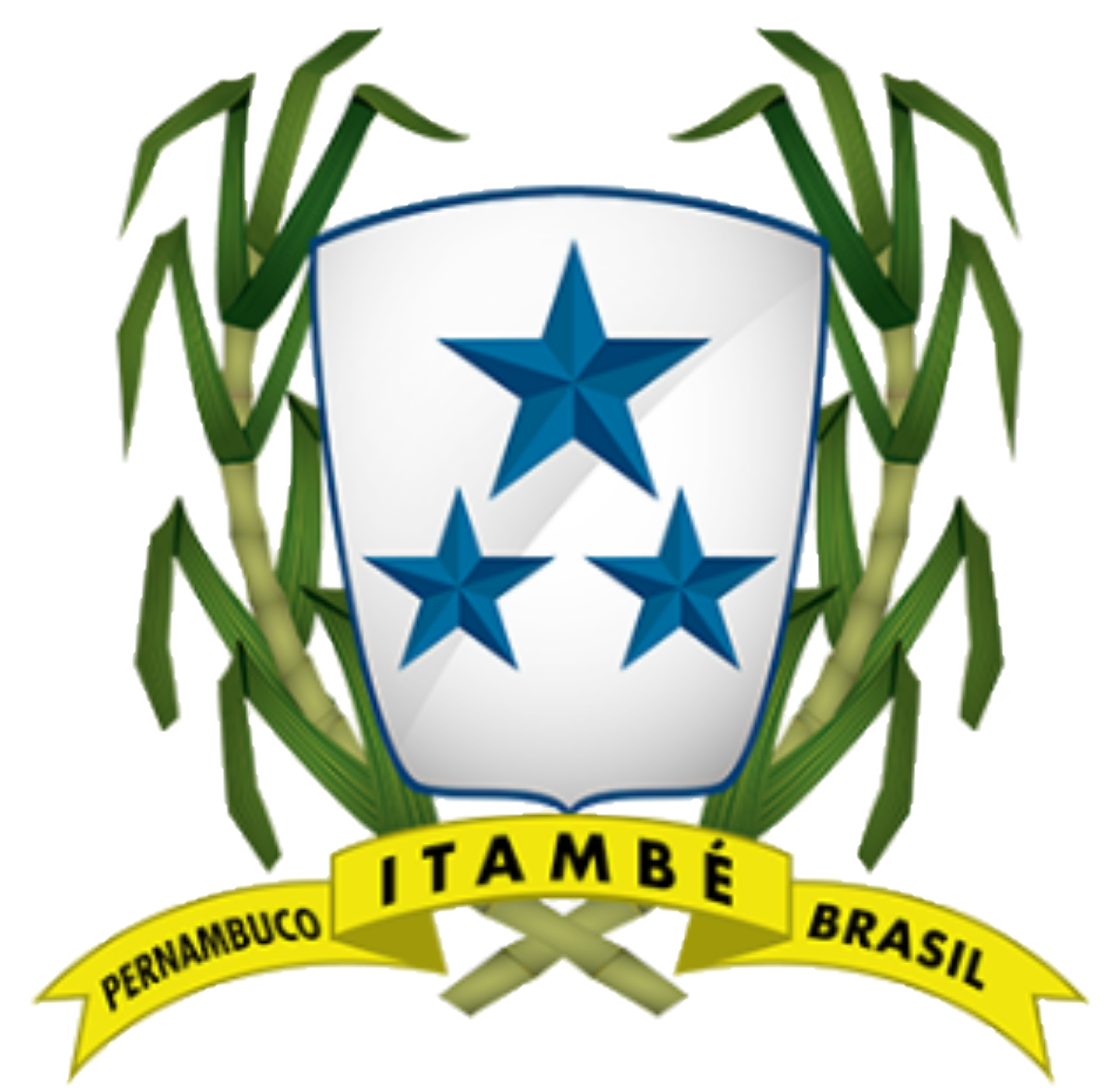
- Flag Coat of arms

- Location within Brazil
- Coordinates: 07°24′33″S 35°06′33″W
- Country: Brazil
- State: Pernambuco

Area
  - Total: 304.38 km^{2} (117.52 sq mi)
- Elevation: 179 m (587 ft)

Population (2022 Census)
  - Total: 34,935
  - Estimate (2025): 36,652

Itambé (Central northeastern portuguese pronunciation: [itɐ̃ˈbɛ]) is a municipality located in the state of Pernambuco, Brazil. Located at 99 km away from Recife, capital of the state of Pernambuco. Has an estimated (IBGE 2025) population of 36,652 inhabitants. The community is split between the state of Pernambuco and the state of Paraíba

City Flag

== Geography ==
- State - Pernambuco
- Region - Zona da mata Pernambucana
- Boundaries - Paraíba state (N); Condado and Aliança (S); Goiana (E); Camutanga and Ferreiros (W)
- Area - 304.38 km^{2}
- Elevation - 179 m
- Hydrography - Goiana River
- Vegetation - Subcaducifólia forest
- Climate - Hot tropical and humid
- Annual average temperature - 24.2 c
- Distance to Recife - 99 km

== Economy ==
The main economic activities in Itambé are based in commerce and agribusiness, especially sugarcane (over 1,233,000 tons); and livestock such as cattle and poultry.

=== Economic indicators ===
Population	GDP x(1000 R$)	GDP pc (R$)	PE
36.126	134.293	3.843	0.23%

Economy by Sector 2006

Primary sector	Secondary sector	Service sector
25.81%	8.46%	65.73%

=== Health indicators ===
HDI (2000)	Hospitals (2007)	Hospitals beds (2007)	Children's Mortality every 1000 (2005)
0.573	1	35	17.8

== Notable people ==
- Graça Araújo - journalist, born in Itambé in 1956

== See also ==
- List of municipalities in Pernambuco
