= Itaquitinga =

Municipality of Pernambuco, Brazil

- Municipality of Pernambuco, Brazil
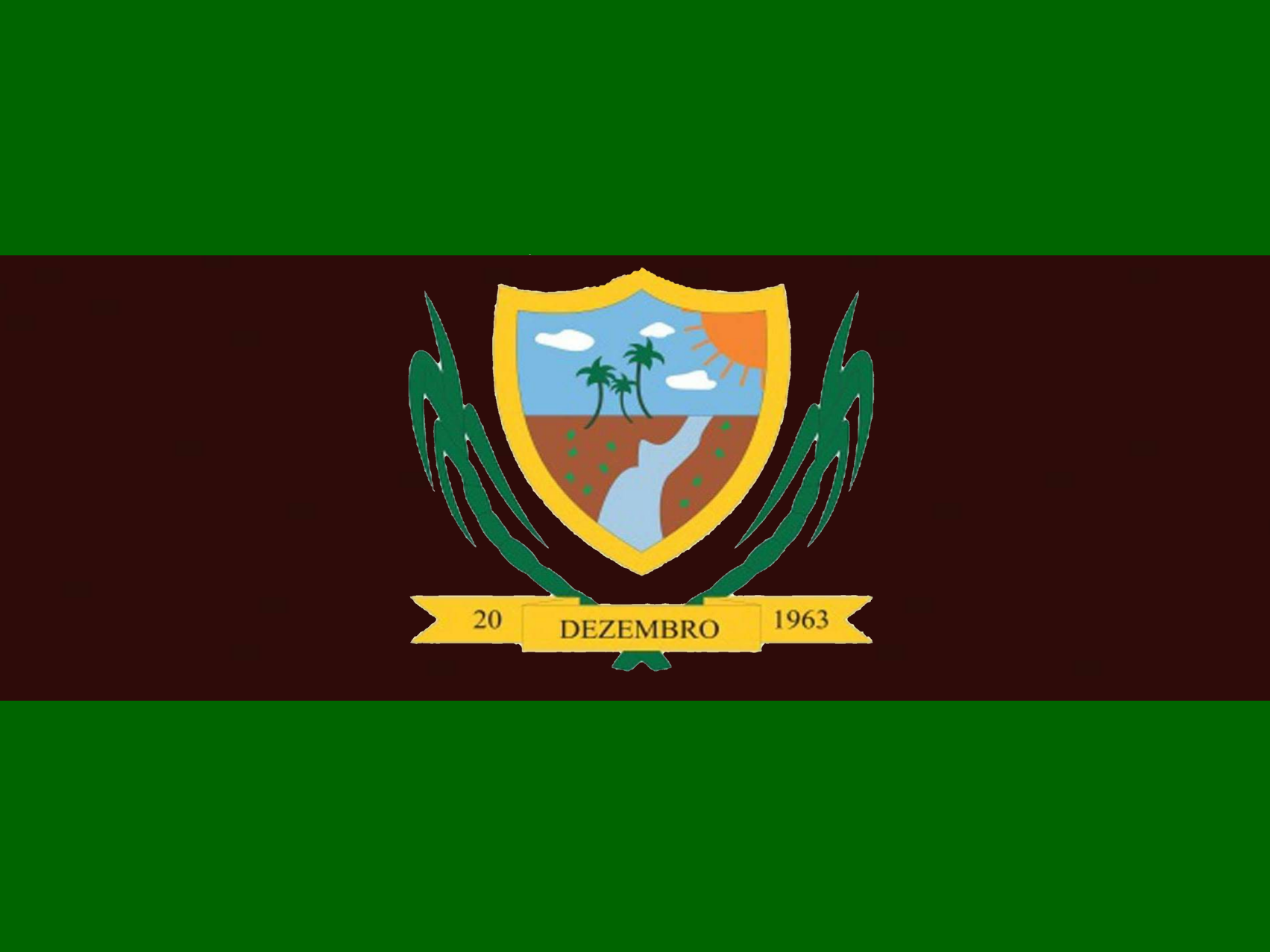
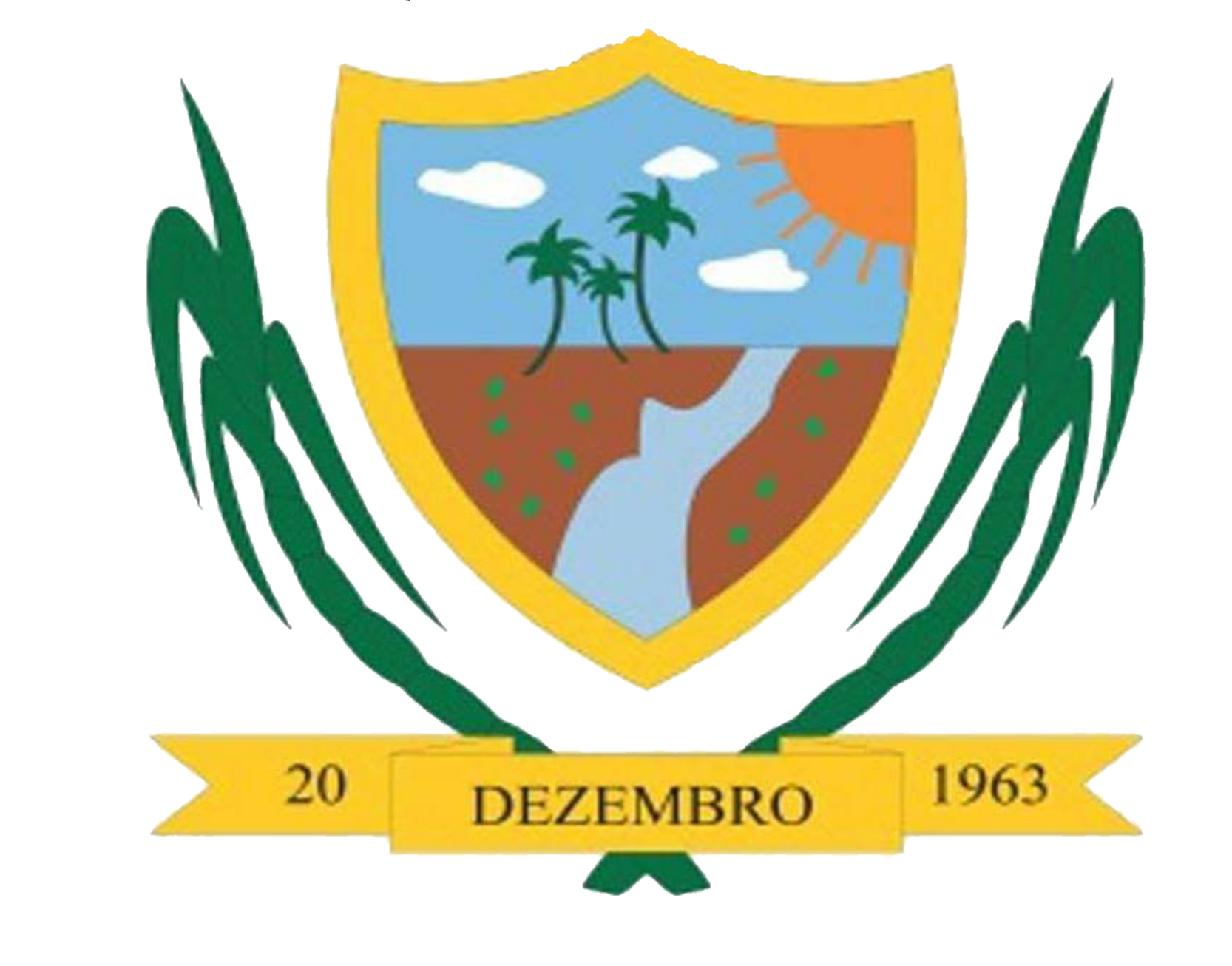
- Flag Coat of arms

- Location of Itaquitinga in Pernambuco

- Location within Brazil Location within South America
- Coordinates: 7°40′4″S 35°6′6″W
- Country: Brazil
- Region: Northeast
- State: Pernambuco
- Founded: 20 December 1963

Government
  - Mayor: Patrick Jose de Oliveira Moraes (PSD) (2025-2028)
  - Vice Mayor: João Marcos Marinho Cavalcanti (PSDB) (2025-2028)

Area
  - Total: 162.739 km^{2} (62.834 sq mi)
- Elevation: 88 m (289 ft)

Population (2022 Census)
  - Total: 16,554
  - Estimate (2025): 17,142
  - Density: 101.72/km^{2} (263.5/sq mi)
- Demonym: Itaquitinguense (Brazilian Portuguese)
- Time zone: UTC-03:00 (Brasília Time)
- Postal code: 55950-000
- HDI (2010): 0.586 – medium
- Website: itaquitinga.pe.gov.br

Itaquitinga (Central northeastern portuguese pronunciation: [iˌtɐk͡wiˈtĩɡɐ]) is a city located in the state of Pernambuco, Brazil. Located at 84 km away from Recife, capital of the state of Pernambuco. Has an estimated (IBGE 2025) population of 17,142 inhabitants.

== Geography ==
- State - Pernambuco
- Region - Zona da mata Pernambucana
- Boundaries - Condado (N); Igarassu (S); Goiana (E); Nazaré da Mata and Tracunhaém (W)
- Area - 103.44 km^{2}
- Elevation - 88 m
- Hydrography - Goiana River
- Vegetation - Subcaducifólia forest
- Climate - Hot tropical and humid
- Annual average temperature - 23.3 c
- Distance to Recife - 84 km

== Economy ==
The main economic activities in Itaquitinga are based in agribusiness, especially sugarcane (over 477,000 tons) and livestock such as cattle and chickens.

=== Economic indicators ===
Population	GDP x(1000 R$)	GDP pc (R$)	PE
15.507	51.946	3.467	0.088%

Economy by Sector 2006

Primary sector	Secondary sector	Service sector
25.89%	8.10%	66.01%

=== Health indicators ===
HDI (2000)	Hospitals (2007)	Hospitals beds (2007)	Children's Mortality every 1000 (2005)
0.587	1	6	25.8

== See also ==
- List of municipalities in Pernambuco
