= Desejo de Menina =

Brazilian forró band

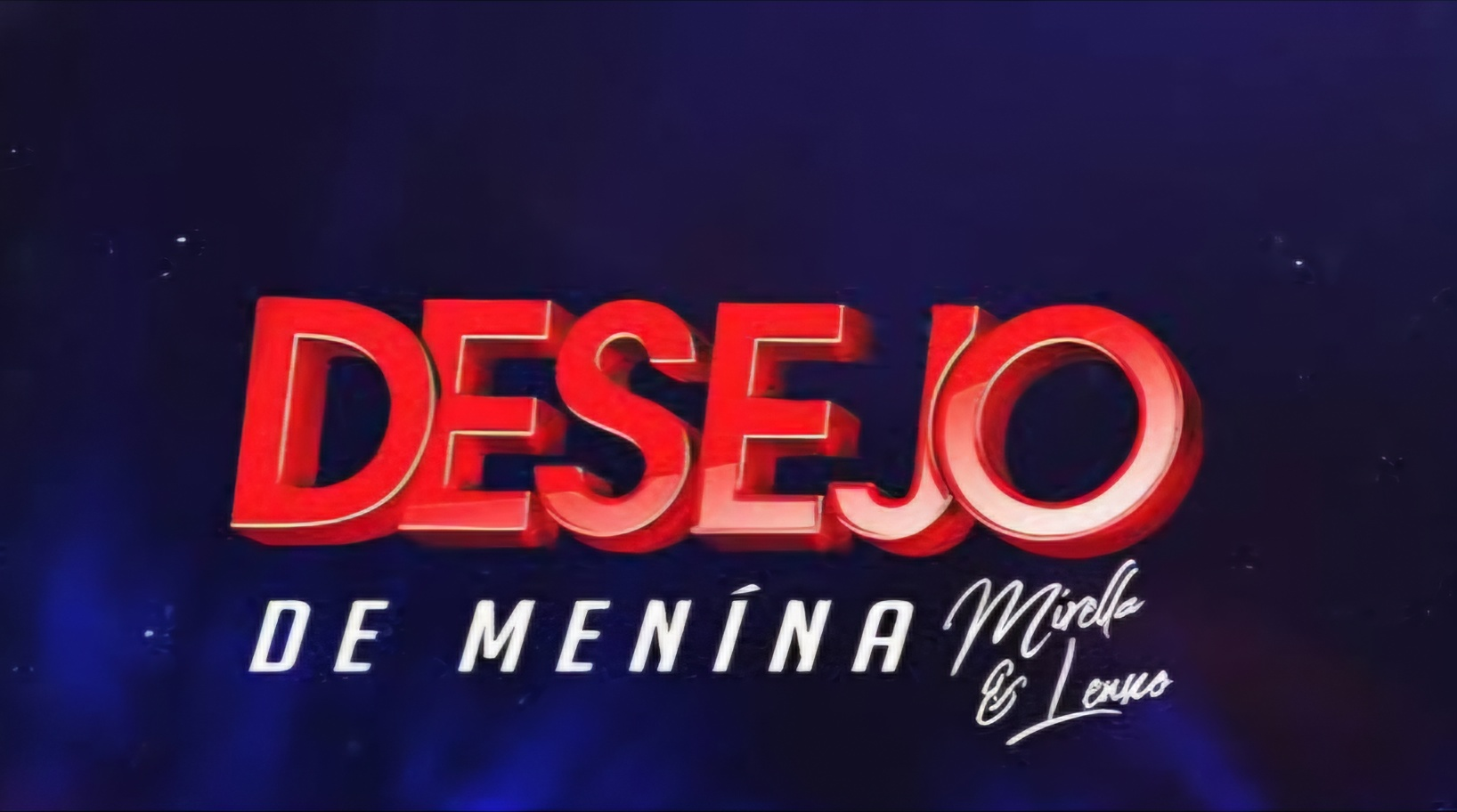

Background information
- Also known as: The Most Romantic One in Brazil
- Origin: Petrolina, Pernambuco, Brazil
- Genre: Forró
- Years active: 2003–present
- Label: Desejo Serviços de Produções e Eventos
- Members: Mirella Vieira; Lenno Ferreira
- Past members: Léo Ferreira; Alba Suany; Jeane Andreia; Yara Tchê; Alessandro Costa; Daniel Almeida; Anny Barbie; Bruna Magalhães; Rafael Nyedson

Desejo de Menina is a Brazilian forró band formed in 2003 in Petrolina, Pernambuco. The project was conceived and structured by entrepreneurs Antonio Soares and Ivan Silva.

The band Desejo de Menina is considered one of the main representatives of romantic forró. Among its major hits are Amor de Corpo e Alma, Beijos, Blues e Poesia, Deixa Eu Te Amar, Diga Sim pra Mim, Moldura, Minha Alma Gêmea É Você, Sonhos e Planos, Sorte, and Vida Vazia. Currently, the vocalists are Mirella Vieira and Lenno Ferreira.

== History ==
=== Desejo de Menina: From Debut to the Classic Lineup (2003–2009) ===
In 2003, the band Desejo de Menina began performing and released its debut album De Corpo, Alma e Coração, which contains fourteen tracks. During the recording of this album, vocalists from the band Bicho do Mato, of Timbaúba, Pernambuco, collaborated. Singers such as Charles Oliveira, Ângelo Melo, Taylana Farias, and Isabel Cristina contributed vocals. Lenno Ferreira also participated—he recorded on the album and later became a permanent member for Desejo de Menina's live shows. At the time, it was common for bands to invite outside vocalists for projects, and Desejo de Menina adopted this practice early in its career.

Estórias is the second studio album by the band Desejo de Menina, released in 2004 following their 2003 debut album, De Corpo, Alma e Coração. The album consists of twenty tracks in total: eight new songs and twelve re-recordings of material from the first album, using the original recordings. The new tracks feature vocal contributions from several artists who, at the time, were not part of the band's regular lineup: Taylana Farias (on two tracks), Ângelo Melo (one track), Lenno Ferreira (three tracks), and Marilda Silva (one track), as well as a duet performed by Ferreira and Farias. The album credits list a core group of vocalists — Lenno Ferreira, Léo Ferreira, Mirella Vieira, Jeane, and Alba Suâny — who later became central to the band's identity. Farias and Melo are credited as "backing vocalists," while Silva is acknowledged for her "special participation." Production was carried out primarily at Estúdio Espaço Livre in Timbaúba, Pernambuco, except for "Abandonei," performed by Marilda Silva, which was recorded at Estúdio 3 in Aracaju, Sergipe.

Moldura is the third studio album by the band Desejo de Menina, released in 2005 by the DN Music label. The album consists of fourteen tracks. It was entirely recorded at Espaço Livre studio in Timbaúba, Pernambuco. This album was the first to feature the vocals of Jeane Andreia, Mirella Vieira, and Alba Suany. Lenno Ferreira was also the lead vocalist during the recording. Contrary to some expectations, Léo Ferreira did not record any tracks for this album. Additional vocal contributions were made by Taylana, who provided lead vocals on the songs "Rotina" and "Vida Vazia," and Johnny Lemos, who sang on "Minha Alma Gêmea É Você" and "Sorte." Despite their lead roles on certain tracks, Taylana and Johnny Lemos were mainly credited as backing vocalists. At the time, Johnny Lemos was focusing on music production and frequently appeared as a guest vocalist on various projects.

In 2006, the band Desejo de Menina recorded their first live DVD in Petrolina, Pernambuco. Featuring twenty-two tracks, the release included vocalists Lenno Ferreira, Mirella Vieira, Léo Ferreira, Alba Suany, and Jeane Andreia. The repertoire consisted of songs from the albums Estória Vol. 2 and Moldura Vol. 3.

In 2008, the band Desejo de Menina released their fourth studio album, Diga Sim Vol. 4, through DN Music. The album features 15 tracks and includes the band's classic lineup of Lenno Ferreira, Mirella Vieira, Léo Ferreira, Alba Suany, and Jeane Andreia. The album continued the collaboration with musicians Johnny Lemos and Taylana Farias, who had contributed to the band's previous albums. Taylana provided lead vocals for the tracks "Nós Dois" and "Culpa do Amor," while Johnny recorded "O Poema," "Pra Sempre é Pouco," and "Chamando Você." In April 2008, the band Desejo de Menina recorded their second live DVD, titled Desejo De Menina – O Forró Mais Romântico do Brasil (Vol. 2), recorded live at Parque Cowboy in João Pessoa, Paraíba. The DVD features 26 songs, mainly performed from their previous studio albums, with a predominance of tracks from the fourth album, Vol. 4. At the time of recording, the band's lineup included Lenno Ferreira, Léo Ferreira, Mirella Vieira, Alba Suany, and Yara Tchê. Vocalist Jeane Andreia had departed the group six months prior to the recording due to an ankle injury and was replaced by Yara Tchê. On December 11 of the same year, Desejo de Menina was awarded "Forró Band of the Year" at a ceremony hosted by radio station Nativa FM, held at the Canecão venue in Rio de Janeiro. For their performance at the event, the band performed the song "Diga Sim Pra Mim" and shared the stage with artists including Marcelo Pires Vieira, Alexandre Pires, and Elymar Santos.

Released in 2009, the album O Amor É pra Sempre, Vol. 5 by the band Desejo de Menina represents a period in which all tracks were recorded by the vocalists who were officially part of the lineup at that time. The singers included Lenno Ferreira, Léo Ferreira, Alba Suany, Yara Tchê—who replaced Jeane Andreia starting with the second DVD, recorded live in João Pessoa—and Anny Barbi, who substituted Mirella Vieira after she joined the band Calcinha Preta. In this fifth volume, Johnny Lemos and Taylana Freitas, who had contributed to previous albums, served as backing vocalists, while the main vocalists were full members of the group. The album features fourteen new tracks.

=== The New Lineup and Journey of Desejo de Menina (2010–2024) ===
In 2010, the band released its sixth studio album, Esperando Você, Vol. 6, which featured a significant change in its lineup. member Yara Tchê and Anny Barbie remained with the group, joined by new vocalists Alessandro Costa and Daniel Almeida. This reorganization followed the departures of previous members Lenno Ferreira and Léo Ferreira, who went on to form a new musical project, and Alba Suany, who took a temporary hiatus from performing. The album consists of 17 tracks of previously unreleased material. In 2010, the band Desejo de Menina, with its new lineup Yara Tchê, Alessandro Costa, Anny Barbi, and Daniel Almeida, recorded its third DVD, titled Ao Vivo em Natal - Rio Grande do Norte, featuring 25 tracks.

In 2011, the band Desejo de Menina released the album Cumplicidade Vol. 7, which contained 21 tracks. Singer Yara Tchê, who had previously taken a hiatus from the group due to her pregnancy, rejoined the band for this release.

In December 2012, the band Desejo de Menina recorded their fourth DVD, titled Cumplicidade — Live in João Pessoa, Paraíba. The release contains 21 tracks and was recorded at the Forrock events and concert venue. The DVD features special appearances by the sertanejo duo César Menotti & Fabiano and the actress Susana Vieira, among others.

In 2013, Desejo de Menina released Sem Medo, Vol. 8. The album comprises 14 previously unreleased tracks and blends contemporary material with the band's signature romantic forró style.

In July 2014, the band Desejo de Menina released their ninth studio album, titled Aqui Se Paga, featuring 14 tracks.

On December 30, 2015, vocalist Daniel Almeida announced in a statement he was leaving the band Desejo de Menina, fulfilling the scheduled shows through January 21, 2016. On January 5, 2016, Desejo de Menina confirmed the singer's departure in a press release. On January 27, 2016, Desejo de Menina recorded the DVD titled Boteco da Desejo, featuring 15 tracks; the DVD was recorded without Daniel. Although it was recorded as a DVD, the official release was only in album format. The remaining lineup was Yara Tchê, Alessandro Costa, and Anie Barbi. In December 2016, Anny Barbi announced her departure from the Banda Desejo de Menina, fulfilling the concert schedule until January 2017. In January 2017, Yara Tchê and Alessandro Costa left the band Desejo de Menina to form the duo Yara Tchê & Alessandro. After their departure, on January 14, 2017, the band Desejo de Menina announced the hiring of singer Rafael Nyedson, who came from a project in the sertanejo genre. Later, on February 7, 2017, the band announced Bruna Magalhães as their new vocalist. On February 22, 2017, Desejo de Menina released their eleventh album, titled Deixa de Marra, featuring Rafael Nyedson and Bruna Magalhães as the new vocalists. Desejo de Menina maintained this lineup until the end of their activities in 2018.

In April 2018, the band Desejo de Menina marked their return to activity with the release of their twelfth album, Surreal, featuring 12 tracks, while also announcing the comeback of vocalists Yara Tchê and Alessandro Costa, who now assumed roles as partners in the musical project.

=== 2023: Festival Desejando (Wishing Festival) ===
In 2023, the band Desejo de Menina created the Festival Desejando, a special, long-running event featuring performances of major romantic hits that marked the group's journey. The Festival Desejando debuted on September 6, 2023, in Teresina, the capital of Piauí, drawing over 20,000 attendees. This information was confirmed by the band's lead singer at the time, Yara Tchê. At that time, Desejo de Menina's vocal lineup included Yara Tchê and Alessandro Costa.

=== 2024: The departure of Yara Tchê and Alessandro Costa, the return of Mirella Vieira and Lenno Ferreira, and the release of the DVD "Desejo Nostálgico" celebrating the band's 21st anniversary ===
On February 27, 2024, singers Yara Tchê and Alessandro Costa announced that they were leaving the band Desejo de Menina and ending their professional ties with manager Antônio Soares, owner of the Desejo de Menina brand. The announcement was made during the contract renewal period. Subsequently, the artists launched a new musical project titled Seu Desejo. On March 6, 2024, the management of the band Desejo de Menina officially announced via their social media the return of original vocalists Mirella Vieira and Lenno Ferreira. The comeback followed the departure of then-vocalists Yara Tchê and Alessandro Costa. Vieira and Ferreira, who were the group's first singers, rejoin the lineup after an absence of approximately fourteen years; they had originally left at the end of 2009. On May 29, 2024, the band Desejo de Menina released a DVD titled Desejo Nostálgico, celebrating 21 years of their career. The release marked the return of original vocalists Mirella Vieira and Lenno Ferreira. The DVD features 17 songs, with a setlist that celebrates the band's biggest hits.

=== Release of the DVD 'Essência' in Late 2024 and the Playlist 'A Mais Romântica do Brasil' in 2025 ===
On February 27, 2025, the group Desejo de Menina released the playlist A Mais Romântica do Brasil, consisting of 24 tracks that include songs from the DVD Essência, recorded at the end of 2024. The compilation features three previously unreleased tracks available exclusively on the Sua Música platform: Perfume, Sensível Demais, and Um Amor Puro. One of the tracks, titled Nosso Amor Se Eternizando, was the final song from the project to be released. In less than a week, the playlist reached over 385,000 streams on Sua Música and accumulated approximately 20,000 downloads.

On September 2, 2025, the band Desejo de Menina performed at the finale of the reality show Rancho do Maia, hosted by influencer Carlinhos Maia. During the performance, which featured the songs Pra Sempre em Meu Viver and Coração, Carlinhos Maia referred to the lead singer Mirella Vieira as "another queen of forró".

== Albums ==
- Vol. 1 - De Corpo, Alma e Coração (2003)
- Vol. 2 - Estórias (2004)
- Vol. 3 - Moldura (2005)
- Ao Vivo em Petrolina (2006)
- Vol. 4 - Diga Sim (2008)
- Ao Vivo em João Pessoa (2008)
- Vol. 5 - O Amor É Para Sempre (2009)
- Acústico e Sertanejo - Edição Especial (2009)
- Vol. 6 - Esperando Você (2010)
- Ao Vivo em Natal (2010)
- Vol. 7 - Cumplicidade (2011)
- Cumplicidade - Ao Vivo em João Pessoa (2012)
- Vol. 8 - Sem Medo (2013)
- Vol. 9 - Aqui Se Paga (2014)
- Vol. 10 - Boteco da Desejo (2016)
- Vol. 11 - Deixa de Marra (2017)
- Vol. 12 - Surreal (2018)
- Vol. 13 - Até Depois do Fim (EP) (2019)
- O Baú da Desejo (2020)
- Até Depois do Fim (Ao Vivo em Teresina) (2020)
- Vol. 14 - Tanto (2021)
- O Seu Desejo (2021)
- Desejo Nostálgico (2024)
- Essência (2024)
- A Mais Romântica do Brasil (2025)
