= Jaime Mota de Farias =

Brazilian priest (1925–2021)

- Bishop of Alagoinhas
- Church: Catholic Church
- Diocese: Diocese of Alagoinhas
- In office: 7 November 1986 – 24 April 2002
- Predecessor: José Floriberto Cornelis
- Successor: Paulo Romeu Dantas Bastos
- Previous posts: Titular Bishop of Ausuccura (1982-1986); Auxiliary Bishop of Nazaré (1982-1986)

Orders
- Ordination: 25 August 1957
- Consecration: 11 September 1982 by Tiago Postma

Personal details
- Born: 12 November 1925 São Bento do Una, Pernambuco, Republic of the United States of Brazil
- Died: 12 April 2021 (aged 95) Alagoinhas, Bahia, Brazil

Jaime Mota de Farias (12 November 1925 – 12 April 2021) was a Brazilian Catholic bishop.

Mota de Farias was born in Brazil and was ordained to the priesthood in 1957. He served as auxiliary bishop of the Roman Catholic Diocese of Nazaré, Brazil, from 1982 to 1986 and as bishop of the Roman Catholic Diocese of Alagoinhas from 1986 to 2002.
