= Camutanga =

Municipality of Pernambuco, Brazil

- Municipality of Pernambuco, Brazil
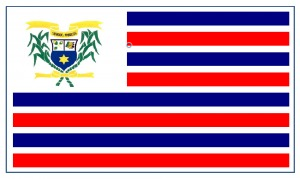
- Flag

- Location of Camutanga in Pernambuco

- Location within Brazil Location within South America
- Coordinates: 7°24′25″S 35°16′26″W
- Country: Brazil
- Region: Northeast
- State: Pernambuco
- Founded: 20 December 1963

Government
  - Mayor: Talita Cardozo Fonseca (PV) (2025-2028)
  - Vice Mayor: Antonio Trigueiro da Silva (PV) (2025-2028)

Area
  - Total: 39.116 km^{2} (15.103 sq mi)
- Elevation: 98 m (322 ft)

Population (2022 Census)
  - Total: 7,750
  - Estimate (2025): 7,962
  - Density: 198.13/km^{2} (513.2/sq mi)
- Demonym: Camutanguense (Brazilian Portuguese)
- Time zone: UTC-03:00 (Brasília Time)
- Postal code: 55930-000
- HDI (2010): 0.606 – medium
- Website: camutanga.pe.gov.br

Camutanga (Central northeastern portuguese pronunciation: [kɐmuˈtɐ̃ɡɐ]) is a city located in the state of Pernambuco, Brazil. Located at 120 km from Recife, capital of the state of Pernambuco. Has an estimated (IBGE 2025) population of 7,962 people and one of the strongest GDP per capita of Zona da mata Pernambucana.

== Geography ==
- State - Pernambuco
- Region - Zona da mata Pernambucana
- Boundaries - Itambé, Bahia and Paraíba state (N); Ferreiros (S); Timbaúba (W); Itambé, Bahia (E)
- Area - 37.3 km^{2}
- Elevation - 98 m
- Hydrography - Goiana River
- Vegetation - Caducifólia forest
- Climate - Hot tropical and humid
- Annual average temperature - 25.2 c
- Distance to Recife - 120 km

== Economy ==
The main economic activities in Camutanga are based in food and beverage industry, commerce and agribusiness, especially sugarcane, bananas; and livestock such as cattle.

=== Economic indicators ===
Population	GDP x(1000 R$).	GDP pc (R$)	PE
8.241	77.417	9.774	0.13%

Economy by Sector 2006

Primary sector	Secondary sector	Service sector
7.53%	50.87%	41.60%

=== Health indicators ===
HDI (2000)	Hospitals (2007)	Hospitals beds (2007)	Children's Mortality every 1000 (2005)
0.632	1	20	24

== See also ==
- List of municipalities in Pernambuco
