= Ladjane Bandeira =

Brazilian artist and journalist

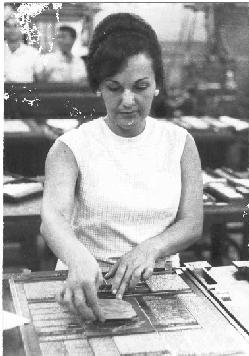
- Ladjane Bandeira in 1960
- Born: Maria Ladjama Bandeira de Lira; 5 June 1927; Nazaré da Mata, Brazil
- Died: 24 March 1999 (aged 71); Recife, Brazil

Ladjane Bandeira or Maria Ladjama Bandeira de Lira (5 June 1927 – 24 March 1999) was a Brazilian artist and journalist. Born in Nazaré da Mata, Brazil, she became Director of the Gallery of Modern Art and President of the Modern Art Society in Recife. She also raised the profile of modern art in the arts pages of the Recife Jornal do Commercio. Her own art was created in paint and sculpture.

== Biography ==
Born on 5 June 1927 in Nazaré da Mata, Brazil, Maria Ladjama Bandeira de Lira was an artist and journalist. She used the name Ladjane Bandeira in professional life. Her media included three dimensional sculpture and two dimensional painting. She moved to Recife and was appointed President of the Modern Art Society and Director of the Gallery of Modern Art in the city. As founder and director of the arts pages in the Recife Jornal do Commercio, she frequently wrote about other major artists and raised awareness of modern art to the general public. She died on 24 March 1999 in Recife.
