= Ferreiros, Pernambuco =

Municipality of Pernambuco, Brazil

Ferreiros
- City
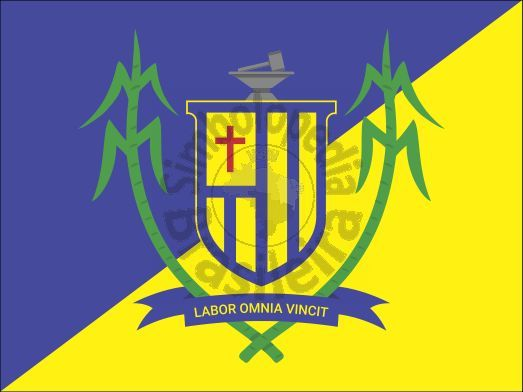
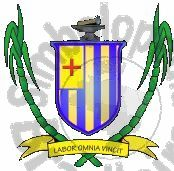
- Flag Coat of arms

- Ferreiros located in Brazil Map
- Coordinates: 7°26′52″S 35°14′38″W
- Country: Brazil
- State: Pernambuco
- Region: Zona da mata

Area
  - Total: 92.1 km^{2} (35.6 sq mi)
- Elevation: 96 m (315 ft)

Population (2022 Census)
  - Total: 15,026
  - Estimate (2025): 15,955
- Time zone: UTC−3 (BRT)

Ferreiros (Central northeastern portuguese pronunciation: [feˈheɾu]) is a city located in the state of Pernambuco, Brazil, 118 km from Recife, capital of the state of Pernambuco, with an estimated (IBGE 2025) population of 15,955 inhabitants.

== Geography ==
- State - Pernambuco
- Region - Zona da mata Pernambucana
- Boundaries - Camutanga (N); Timbaúba and Aliança (S); Timbaúba (W); Itambé (E)
- Area - 92.1 km^{2}
- Elevation - 96 m
- Hydrography - Goiana River
- Vegetation - Subcaducifólia forest
- Climate - Hot tropical and humid
- Annual average temperature - 25.2 °C
- Distance to Recife - 118 km

== Economy ==
The main economic activities in Ferreiros are based in footwear industry, commerce and agribusiness, especially sugarcane, bananas; and livestock such as cattle and poultry.

=== Economic indicators ===
Population	GDP x(1000 R$).	GDP pc (R$)	PE
11,456	43,343	3,940	0.073%

Economy by Sector 2006

Primary sector	Secondary sector	Service sector
21.49%	12.68%	65.83%

=== Health indicators ===
HDI (2000)	Hospitals (2007)	Hospitals beds (2007)	Children's Mortality every 1000 (2005)
0.629	---	---	34.9

== See also ==
- List of municipalities in Pernambuco
