= Timbaúba Futebol Clube =

Brazilian football club

Timbaúba
- Full name: Timbaúba Futebol Clube
- Nickname: Amarelos
- Founded: 2009
- Ground: Estádio Ferreira Lima
- Capacity: 6,000
- League: Campeonato Pernambucano Série A2
| Home colours | Away colours | Third colours |

The Timbaúba Futebol Clube is a Brazilian football club located in Timbaúba, state of Pernambuco. Currently dispute the Campeonato Pernambucano Série A2.

== Stadium ==
Timbaúba plays their home matches at the Estádio Ferreira Lima which has a capacity of 6,000 seats.

== Current squad ==
According to the CBF register.

Note: Flags indicate national team as defined under FIFA eligibility rules; some limited exceptions apply. Players may hold more than one non-FIFA nationality.

| No. | Pos. | Nation | Player |
|---|---|---|---|
| 11 | FW | BRA | Kleiton (contract) |
| — | DF | BRA | Andrade (contract) |
| — | | BRA | Nestor (contract) |

| No. | Pos. | Nation | Player |
|---|---|---|---|
| — | | BRA | Nil (contract) |
| — | | BRA | Tavinho (contract) |

== Performance competitions ==
=== Campeonato Pernambucano - Série A2 ===
| Year | Position |
| 2010 | In Dispute |

=== Copa Pernambuco ===
| Year | Position |
| 2010 | 4th |
