= Graça Araújo =

Brazilian journalist (born 1956–2018)

- Born: Maria Gracilane Araújo da Silva; April 2, 1956; Itambé, Pernambuco, Brazil
- Died: September 8, 2018 (aged 62); Recife, Pernambuco, Brazil
- Occupations: Journalist and TV host

Maria Gracilane Araújo da Silva, better known as Graça Araújo (April 2, 1956 – September 8, 2018), was a Brazilian journalist and television presenter.

== Biography ==
At the age of three, Araújo moved to São Paulo with her family, who were looking work. She had seven siblings and at one point, she lived in a house with ten people. At age 14, she already worked to help support her family. Araújo thought about studying medicine, but she fascinated with journalism when she worked as a secretary in a magazine.

Araújo graduated by the Faculdades Integradas Alcântara Machado in 1987 and returned to Recife. Her first work in the capital of Pernambuco was in the radio Transamérica. Then, she went to Rádio Clube. Araújo passed by TV Manchete, TV Pernambuco and became report boss of TV Jornal, affiliated with SBT, in 1992. In the station, she helped in the formatting of the newscast TV Jornal Meio-Dia, from which she was presenter by 26 years. In the time, Araújo was the one black woman television presenter in Pernambuco.

Araújo also was radio presenter in Rádio Jornal, also from Sistema Jornal do Commercio de Comunicação. For seventeen years, she commanded the afternoons of the station in the program Rádio Livre, from which integrated the famous supplement Consultório de Graça (Graça's Doctor's Office), where doctors discussed various health-related topics daily. In August 2018, the program about brain cancer won the first place in the radio category at the SBN Journalism Award, from the Brazilian Society of Neurosurgery.

Also in August 2018, Araújo was one of those honored at a solemn session of the Court of Justice of Pernambuco, receiving an award granted to professionals who improve the work of the justice in the state. She also was honored in the book Sucesso: O Que Elas Pensam? (Success: What Do They Think?), that reunites 150 women that count how they arrived to the professional success.

In an interview published on the TV Jornal website in November 2011, Araújo spoke about her choice to be a journalist: "I saw that the journalism is capable of healing many deep wounds, of bringing about transformations. That is, if you do your work responsibly, ethically, and with discipline, right?", spoke Araújo.

In her personal life, Araújo was known for her physical activities and participation of races, winning several medals. In her social media, it was common to see photos of the presenter exercising at the gym or running outdoors. She even competed in the Saint Silvester Road Race in São Paulo, where she debuted in 2010, and the Paris Marathon. Araújo had no romantic relationships and no children.

== Death ==
Araújo died on September 8, 2018, at 12:55 pm, on the dependences of the Esperança Hospital, in decorrence of an extense hemorrhagic stroke, suffered in the early evening of September 6, 2018, when she practiced exercises in an academy of the south zone of Recife.
