= Condado, Pernambuco =

City in Pernambuco, Brazil

Condado
- Municipality of Pernambuco, Brazil
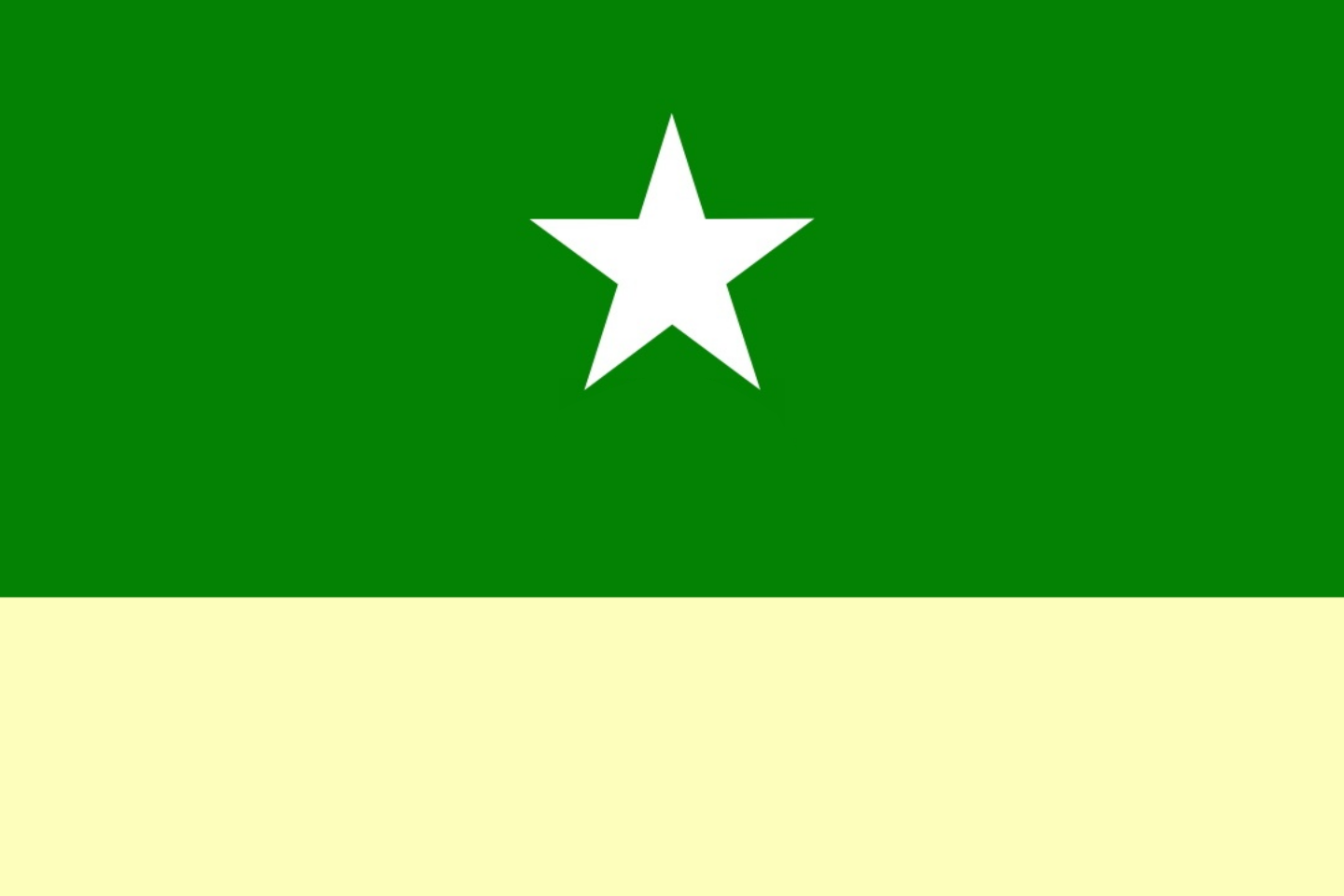
- Flag

- Location of Condado in Pernambuco

- Location within Brazil Location within South America
- Coordinates: 7°35′9″S 35°6′21″W
- Country: Brazil
- Region: Northeast
- State: Pernambuco
- Founded: 31 December 1958

Government
  - Mayor: Severino Albino da Silva Filho (PP) (2025-2028)
  - Vice Mayor: Genyalda Soares de Santana (PSD) (2025-2028)

Area
  - Total: 89.645 km^{2} (34.612 sq mi)
- Elevation: 129 m (423 ft)

Population (2022 Census)
  - Total: 24,587
  - Estimate (2025): 25,416
  - Density: 274.27/km^{2} (710.4/sq mi)
- Demonym: Condadense (Brazilian Portuguese)
- Time zone: UTC-03:00 (Brasília Time)
- Postal code: 55940-000
- HDI (2010): 0.602 – medium
- Website: condado.pe.gov.br

Condado (Central northeastern portuguese pronunciation: [kõˈdɐdŭ]) is a city located in the state of Pernambuco, Brazil. Located at 69.3 km away from Recife, capital of the state of Pernambuco. Has an estimated (IBGE 2025) population of 25,416inhabitants.

== Geography ==
- State - Pernambuco
- Region - Zona da mata Pernambucana
- Boundaries - Itambé (N); Nazaré da Mata and Itaquitinga (S); Goiana (E); Aliança (W)
- Area - 89.64 km^{2}
- Elevation - 129 m
- Hydrography - Goiana River
- Vegetation - Subperenifólia forest
- Climate - Hot tropical and humid
- Distance to Recife - 69.3 km

== Economy ==
The main economic activities in Condado are based in agribusiness, especially sugarcane and livestock such as cattle and chickens.

=== Economic indicators ===
Population	GDP x(1000 R$).	GDP pc (R$)	PE
24.403	71.599	3.085	0.12%

Economy by Sector 2006

Primary sector	Secondary sector	Service sector
15.83%	8.13%	76.04%

=== Health indicators ===
HDI (2000)	Hospitals (2007)	Hospitals beds (2007)	Children's Mortality every 1000 (2005)
0.627	1	21	18.5

== See also ==
- List of municipalities in Pernambuco
