= Diocese of Alagoinhas =

Catholic ecclesiastical territory

Coordinates: 12.1388°S 38.4254°W

Diocese of Alagoinhas Dioecesis Alacunensis

Catholic
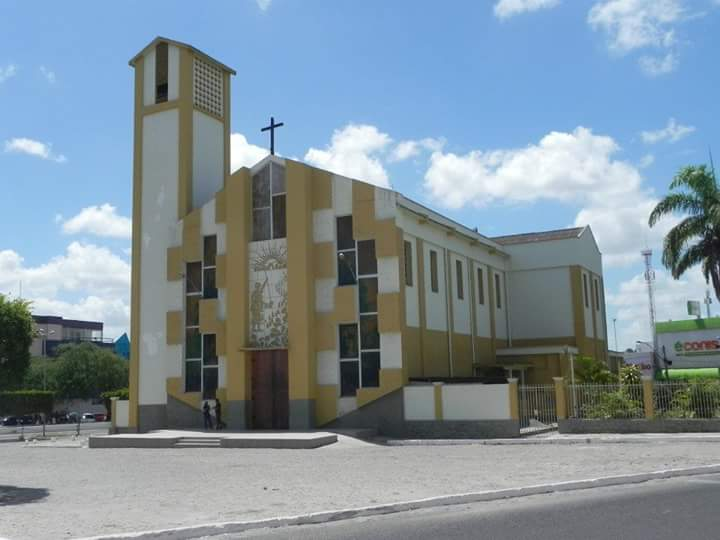
- Catedral Santo Antônio in 2016

Location
- Country: Brazil
- Ecclesiastical province: São Salvador da Bahia

Statistics
- Area: 15,795 km^{2} (6,098 sq mi)
- Population: Total; Catholics: (as of 2004); 680,000; 524,000 (77.1%)

Information
- Rite: Latin Rite
- Established: 28 October 1974 (51 years ago)
- Cathedral: Catedral Santo Antônio

Current leadership
- Pope: Leo XIV
- Bishop: Francisco de Oliveira Vidal
- Metropolitan Archbishop: Murilo Sebastião Ramos Krieger

The Roman Catholic Diocese of Alagoinhas (Latin: Dioecesis Alacunensis) is a diocese located in the city of Alagoinhas in the ecclesiastical province of São Salvador da Bahia in Brazil.

== History ==
- 28 October 1974: Established as Diocese of Alagoinhas from the Metropolitan Archdiocese of São Salvador da Bahia

== Leadership ==
- Bishops of Alagoinhas (Latin Rite)
  - José Floriberto Cornelis, O.S.B. (13 Nov 1974 – 24 May 1986), Archbishop (personal title)
  - Jaime Mota de Farias (7 Nov 1986 – 24 Apr 2002)
  - Paulo Romeu Dantas Bastos (24 Apr 2002 – 13 Jan 2021)
  - Francisco de Oliveira Vidal (27 Sep 2022 – present)
