= Aliança =

City in Pernambuco, Brazil

- City
- Flag Coat of arms

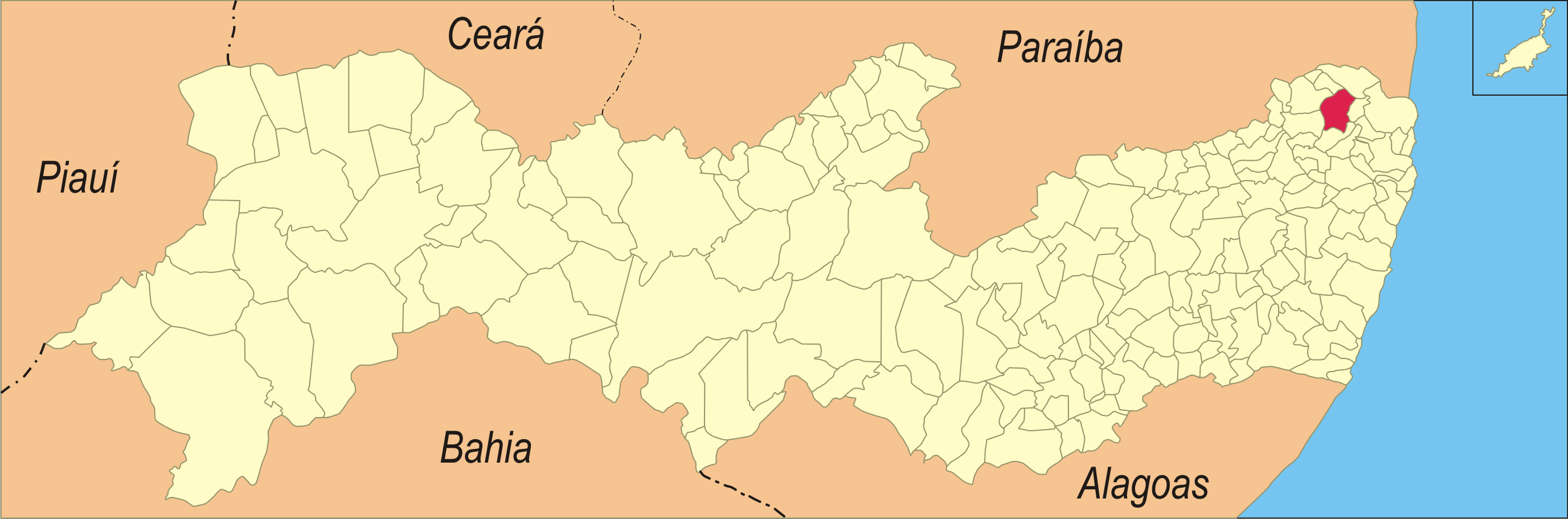
- Location in the state of Pernambuco

- Location within Brazil
- Coordinates: 7°36′10″S 35°13′51″W
- Country: Brazil
- State: Pernambuco
- Region: Zona da Mata

Area
  - Total: 272.73 km^{2} (105.30 sq mi)
- Elevation: 123 m (404 ft)

Population (2022 Census)
  - Total: 35,741
  - Estimate (2025): 37,349

Aliança (Central northeastern portuguese pronunciation: [ɐliˈɐ̃sɐ]) (Alliance) is a city located in the state of Pernambuco, Brazil, 82 kilometres from Recife, capital of the state of Pernambuco. Aliança has an estimated population of 37,349 inhabitants (IBGE 2025).

== Geography ==
- State - Pernambuco
- Region - Zona da mata Pernambucana
- Boundaries - Ferreiros and Itambé (N); Nazaré da Mata (S); Condado (E); Timbaúba and Vicência (W)
- Area - 272.73 km^{2}
- Elevation - 123 m
- Hydrography - Goiana River
- Vegetation - Subcaducifólia forest
- Climate - Hot tropical and humid
- Annual average temperature - 25.4 c
- Distance to Recife - 82 km

== Economy ==
The main economic activities in Aliança are based in industry, commerce and agribusiness, especially sugarcane (over 948,000 tons); and livestock such as cattle and poultry.

=== Economic indicators ===
Population	GDP x(1000 R$).	GDP pc (R$)	PE
37.415	124.876	3.595	0.21%

Economy by Sector 2006

Primary sector	Secondary sector	Service sector
22.48%	10.15%	67.37%

=== Health indicators ===
HDI (2000)	Hospitals (2007)	Hospitals beds (2007)	Children's Mortality every 1000 (2005)
0.578	2	26	29.8

== See also ==
- List of municipalities in Pernambuco
