= Diocese of Nazaré =

Catholic ecclesiastical territory

Coordinates: 7°44′36.4″S 35°13′45.9″W

Diocese of Nazaré Dioecesis Nazarensis in Brasilia

Catholic
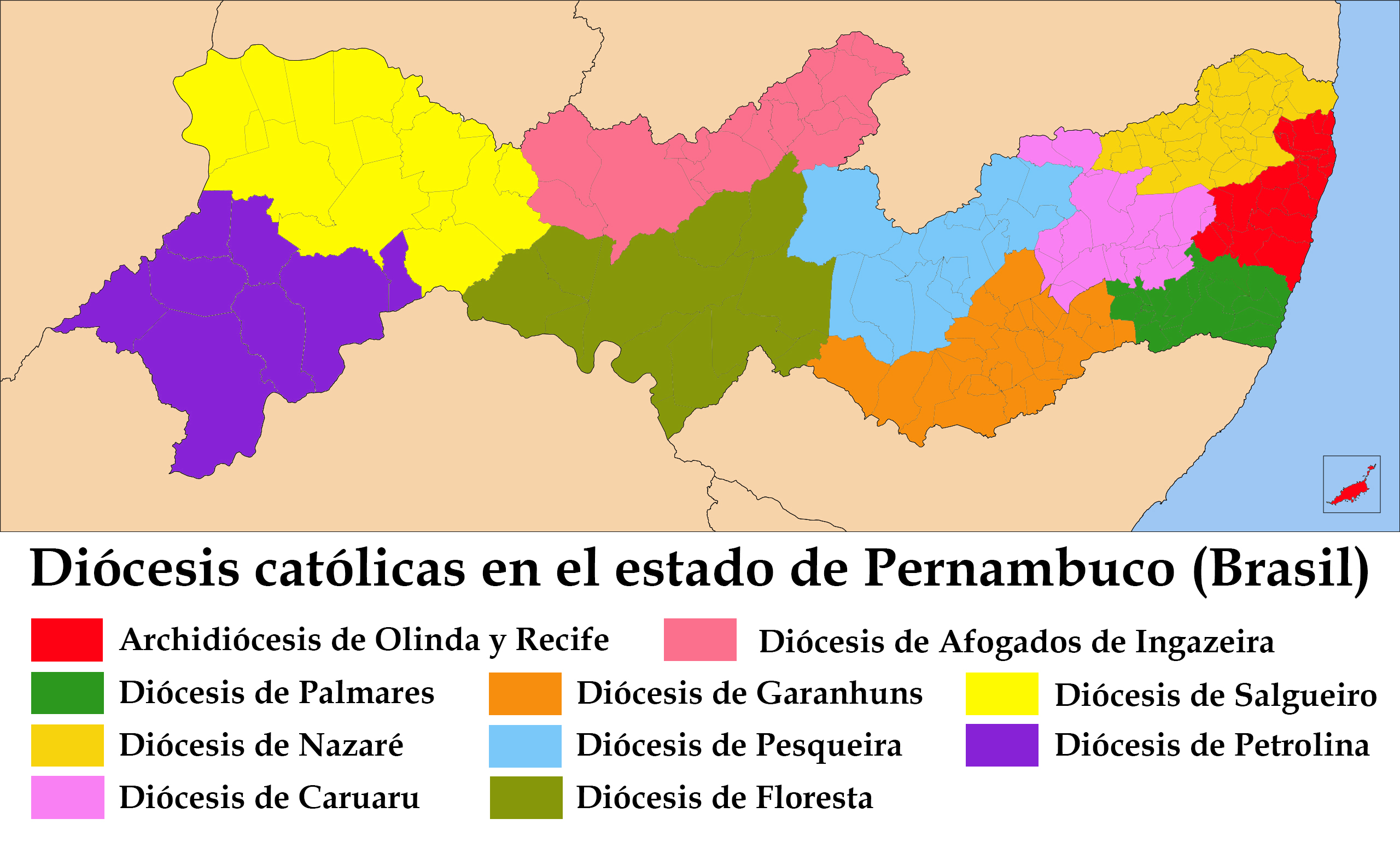
- Catholic dioceses in the state of Pernambuco

Location
- Country: Brazil
- Ecclesiastical province: Olinda e Recife

Statistics
- Area: 5,986 km^{2} (2,311 sq mi)
- Population: Total; Catholics: (as of 2004); 904,261; 768,261 (85.0%)

Information
- Rite: Latin Rite
- Established: 2 August 1918 (108 years ago)
- Cathedral: Catedral Nossa Senhora da Conceição

Current leadership
- Pope: Leo XIV
- Bishop: Francisco de Assis Dantas de Lucena
- Metropolitan Archbishop: Fernando Antônio Saburido, OSB
- Bishops emeritus: Severino Batista de França, OFMCap; Jorge Tobias de Freitas

Website
- www.diocesedenazare.org

The Roman Catholic Diocese of Nazaré (Latin: Dioecesis Nazarensis in Brasilia) is located in the city of Nazaré da Mata in the ecclesiastical province of Olinda e Recife in Brazil.

On August 2, 1918 it was established as Diocese of Nazaré from the Metropolitan Archdiocese of Olinda e Recife.

== Bishops ==
- Bishops of Nazaré (Roman rite), in reverse chronological order
  - Francisco de Assis Dantas de Lucena (2016.07.13 – present)
  - Severino Batista de França, OFMCap (2007.03.07 – 2015.11.25)
  - Jorge Tobias de Freitas (1986.11.07 – 2006.07.26)
  - Manuel Lisboa de Oliveira (1963.02.25 – 1986.11.07)
  - Manuel Pereira da Costa (1959.06.20 – 1962.08.23)
  - João de Souza Lima (later Archbishop) (1955.02.06 – 1958.01.16)
  - Carlos Gouvêa Coelho (later Archbishop) (1948.01.10 – 1954.12.14)
  - Riccardo Ramos de Castro Vilela (1919.07.03 – 1946.08.16)

=== Auxiliary bishop ===
- Jaime Mota de Farias (1982-1986), appointed Bishop of Alagoinhas, Bahia

=== Other priests of this diocese who became bishops ===
- João da Matha de Andrade e Amaral, appointed Bishop of Cajazeiras, Paraiba in 1934
- Gentil Diniz Barreto, appointed Bishop of Mossoró, Rio Grande do Norte in 1960
- Manoel dos Reis de Farias, appointed Bishop of Patos, Paraiba in 2001
- Limacêdo Antônio da Silva, appointed Auxiliary bishop of Olinda e Recife, Pernambuco in 2018
