= Timbaúba =

Municipality of Pernambuco, Brazil

Timbauba
- City
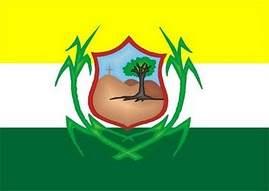
- Flag

- Location within Brazil
- Coordinates: 7°30′39″S 35°19′04″W
- Country: Brazil
- Regions: Northeast
- State: Pernambuco
- Founded: 1879

Area
  - City: 292.28 km^{2} (112.85 sq mi)
- Elevation: 102 m (335 ft)

Population (2022 Census)
  - City: 46,147
  - Estimate (2025): 47,312
  - Density: 157.89/km^{2} (408.92/sq mi)
  - Metro: 55,213
- Time zone: UTC−3 (BRT)
- Postal code: 55870
- Area code: (+55) 81

Timbaúba (Central northeastern portuguese pronunciation: [tĩbɐˈubɐ]) is a city in Pernambuco, Brazil. According to the Brazilian Institute of Geography and Statistics, it has an estimated population of 47,312 inhabitants as of 2025.

== Geography ==
- State - Pernambuco
- Region - Zona da mata Pernambucana
- Boundaries - Paraíba state (N); Vicência (S); Macaparana (W); Aliança, Ferreiros and Camutanga (E)
- Area - 289.51 km^{2}
- Elevation - 102 m
- Hydrography - Goiana River
- Vegetation - Subcaducifólia forest
- Climate - Hot tropical and humid
- Annual average temperature - 24.6 c
- Distance to Recife - 96 km

== Economy ==
The main economic activities in Timbaúba are based in commerce and agribusiness, especially growing sugarcane and bananas, and raising livestock such as cattle, sheep and goats.

=== Economic indicators ===
Population	GDP x(1000 R$).	GDP pc (R$)	PE
51.770	304.452	5.908	0.50%

Economy by sector 2006

Primary sector	Secondary sector	Service sector
12.06%	19.05%	68.89%

=== Health indicators ===
HDI (2000)	Hospitals (2007)	Hospitals beds (2007)	Children's mortality every 1000 (2005)
0.649	2	153	25.2

== Sports ==
The main sport in Timbaúba is football, which is represented by Timbaúba Futebol Clube, currently playing the Campeonato Pernambucano's Série A2.

== See also ==
- List of municipalities in Pernambuco
