= Nazaré da Mata =

Municipality of Pernambuco, Brazil

- Municipality
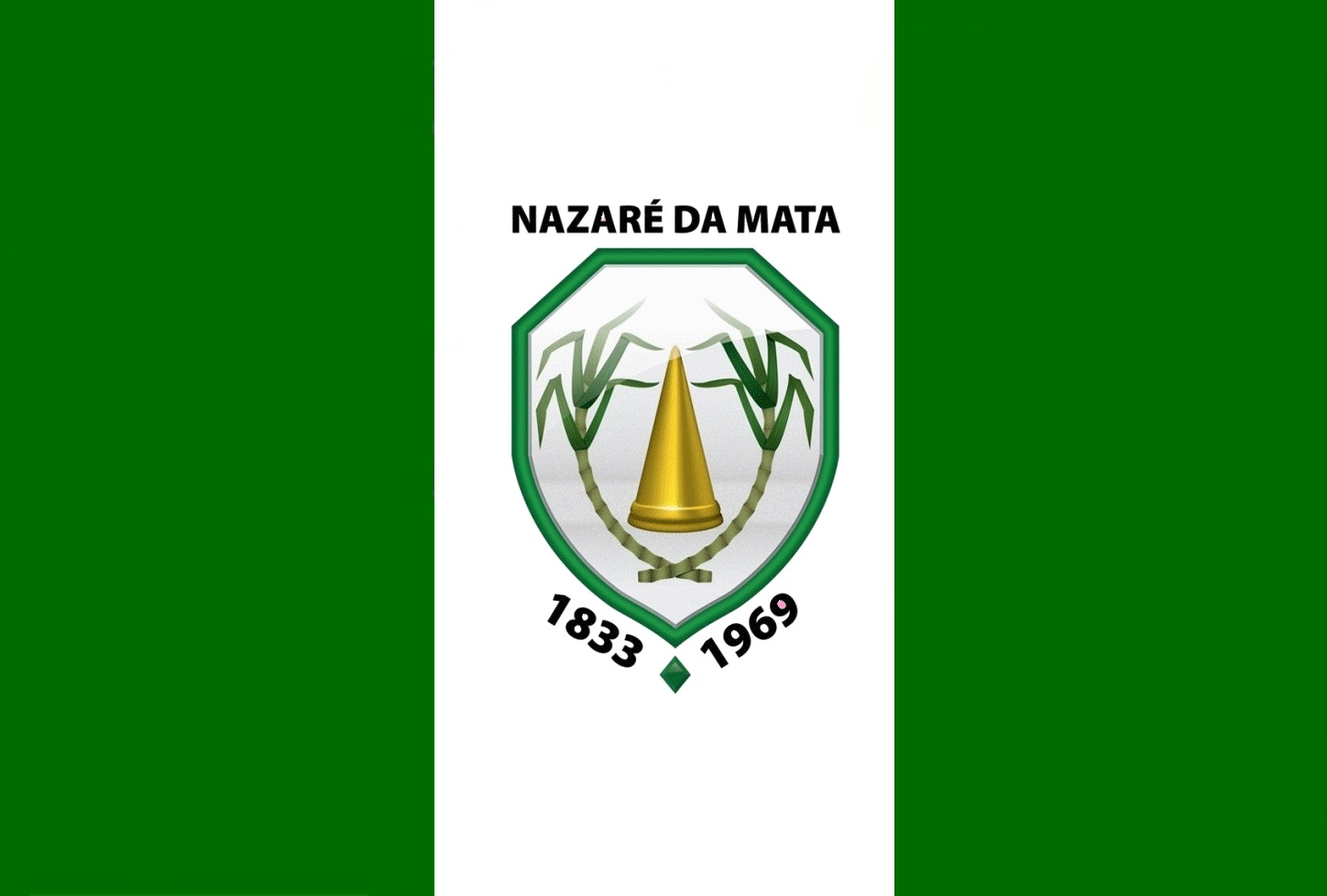
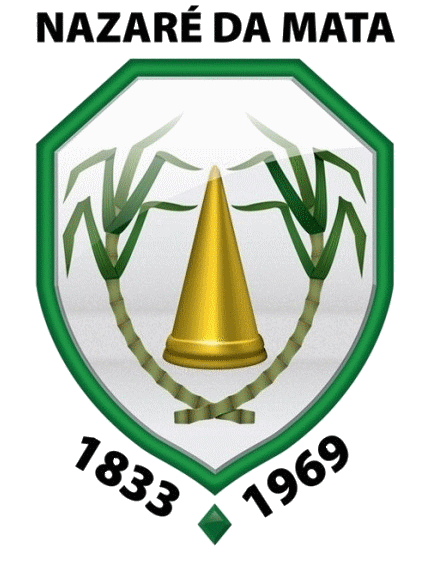
- Flag Coat of arms

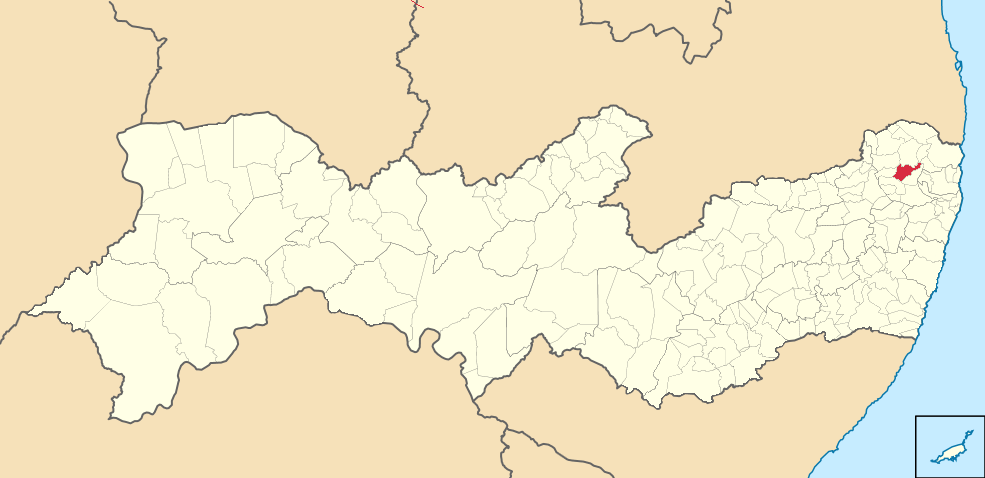
- Location in Pernambuco state

- Location in Brazil
- Coordinates: 7°44′31″S 35°13′40″W
- Country: Brazil
- Region: Northeast
- State: Pernambuco

Area
  - Total: 150.8 km^{2} (58.2 sq mi)
- Elevation: 89 m (292 ft)

Population (2022 Census)
  - Total: 30,648
  - Estimate (2025): 32,187
  - Density: 203.2/km^{2} (526.4/sq mi)
- Time zone: UTC−3 (BRT)

Nazaré da Mata (Central northeastern portuguese pronunciation: [nɐzɐˈɾɛ dɐ ˈmɐtɐ]) is a city located in the state of Pernambuco, Brazil. Located at 62 km from Recife, capital of the state of Pernambuco. It has an estimated (IBGE 2020) population of 32,573 people, and it is well known as the town of Maracatu Rural and its engenhos de cana-de-açúcar (sugarcane plantations houses). It is the seat of the Roman Catholic Diocese of Nazaré.

== Geography ==
- State - Pernambuco
- Region - Zona da mata Pernambucana
- Boundaries - Aliança, Condado and Itaquitinga (N); Tracunhaém (S and E); Carpina and Buenos Aires (W); Vitória de Santo Antão (E)
- Area - 150.8 km^{2}
- Elevation - 89 m
- Hydrography - Goiana River
- Vegetation - Subcaducifólia forest
- Climate - Hot tropical and humid
- Annual average temperature - 25.3 c
- Distance to Recife - 62 km

== Economy ==
The main economic activities in Nazaré da Mata are based in food and beverage industry, commerce and agribusiness, especially sugarcane; and livestock such as poultry, cattle, goats and sheep.

=== Economic indicators ===
Population	GDP x(1000 R$).	GDP pc (R$)	PE
30.185	148.466	5.084	0.25%

Economy by Sector 2006

Primary sector	Secondary sector	Service sector
13.17%	23.20%	63.63%

=== Health indicators ===
HDI (2000)	Hospitals (2007)	Hospitals beds (2007)	Children's Mortality every 1000 (2005)
0.703	2	104	23.6

== See also ==
- List of municipalities in Pernambuco
