= Mazapil =

- City & municipal seat
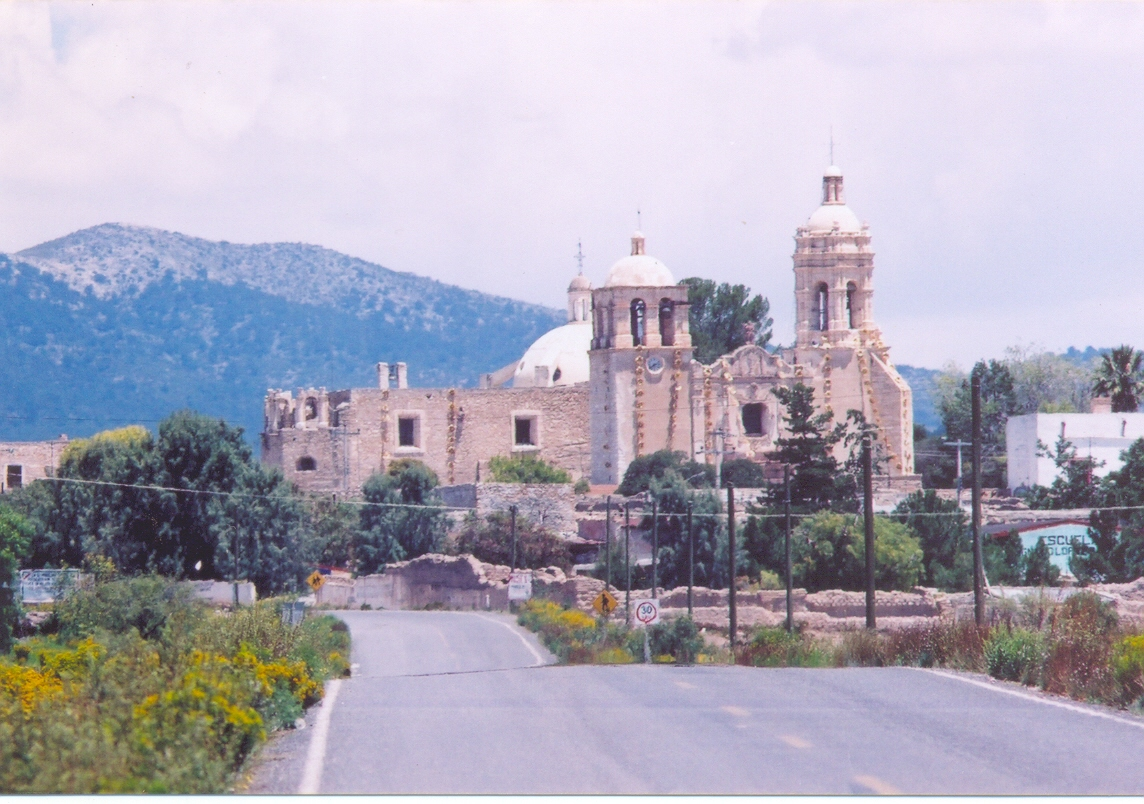
- Entrance to Mazapil

- Location of Mazapil Mazapil (Mexico)
- Coordinates: 24°38′18″N 101°33′19″W
- Country: Mexico
- State: Zacatecas
- Municipality: Mazapil
- Founded: 1568
- Elevation: 2,268 m (7,441 ft)

Population (2020)
  - Total: 1,262
- Area code: 842

Mazapil is a locality in the Mexican state of Zacatecas. It serves as the municipal seat of the eponymous Mazapil Municipality.

== Etymology ==
Mazapil's name derives from the Nahuatl place name Mazatlpilli, itself derived from mazatl "deer" and pilli "small".

== History ==
The original inhabitants of the Mazapil valley were nomadic Chichimeca peoples known to the Spaniards as Guachichiles. Francisco de Ibarra reached the area in 1554. In 1562, Pedro de Ahumada y Samano reported finding the valley inhabited by 6000 native warriors armed with bows and arrows. Silver mines were first established in the valley in the late 1560s.

Mazapil became the seat of its namesake municipality, which was one of Zacatecas's eleven original subdivisions (then known as partidos) when the state's constitution was enacted in 1825.

== Demographics ==
Mazapil is one of the 175 localities in Mazapil Municipality, and it is the only one that is classified as urban. Located in the northeast corner of the municipality, it recorded a population of 1,262 in the 2020 census, up from 794 inhabitants in the 2010 Census.

== Economy ==
The main economic activities in Mazapil are mining and agriculture.
