= Itambé, Bahia =

Municipality of Bahia, Brazil

Itambé
- Municipality
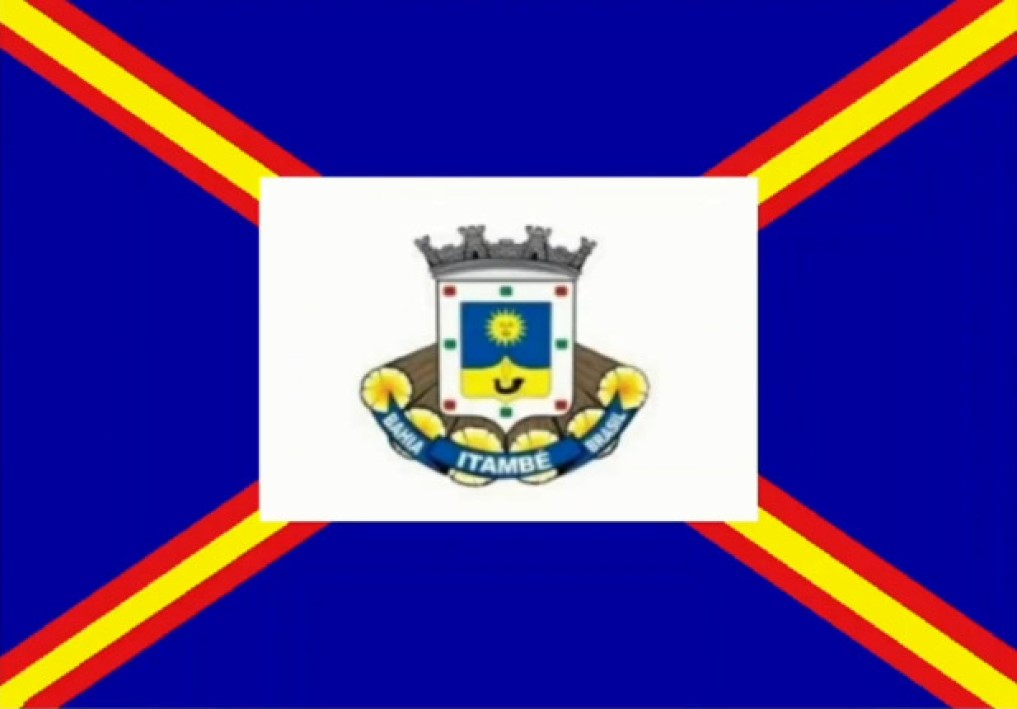
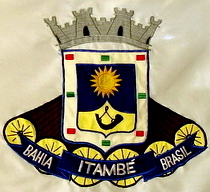
- Flag Coat of arms

- Location in Brazil
- Coordinates: 15°14′42″S 40°37′26″W
- Country: Brazil
- Region: Nordeste
- State: Bahia

Population (2020)
  - Total: 22,754
- Time zone: UTC−3 (BRT)

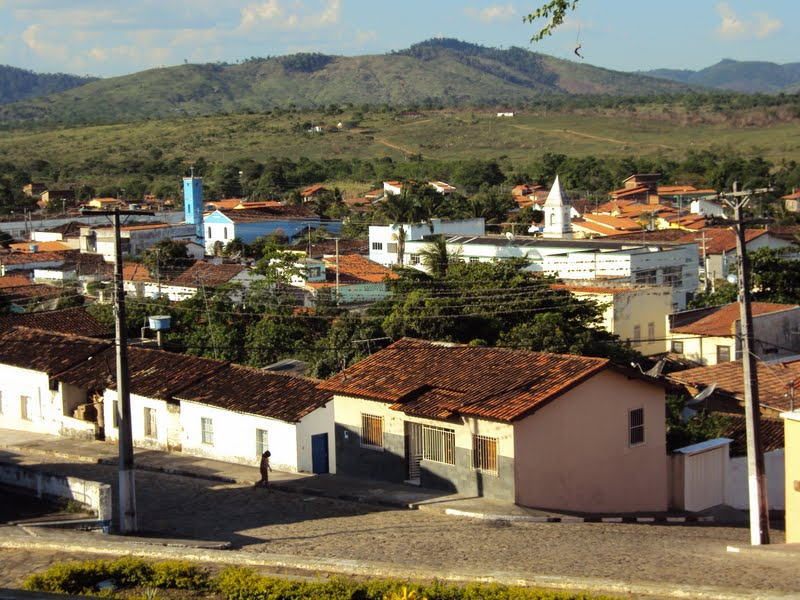
Panoramic view of part of the Itambé Center (Bahia)

Itambé is a municipality in the state of Bahia in the Northeast Region of Brazil.

== See also ==
- List of municipalities in Bahia
