= Alagoinhas =

Municipality of Bahia, Brazil

Alagoinhas, Bahia, Brasil
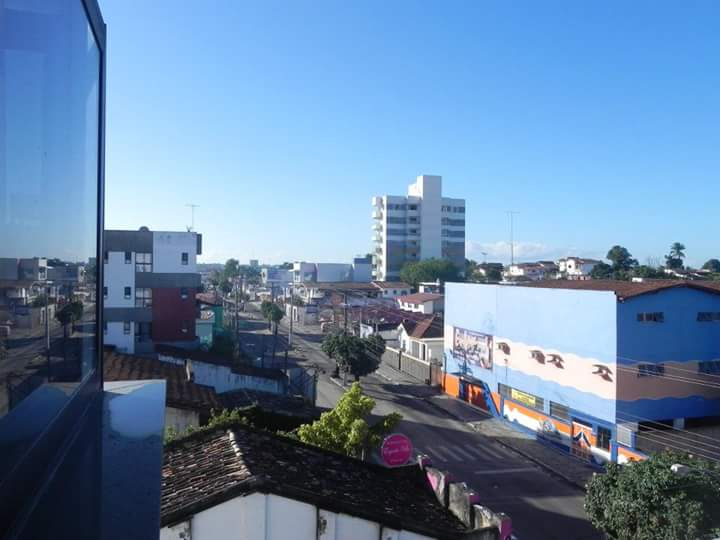

- Flag Coat of arms

- Location of Alagoinhas

- Location within Brazil
- Coordinates: 12°08′09″S 38°25′08″W
- Country: Brazil
- Region: Nordeste
- State: Bahia
- Founded: 1852

Government
  - Mayor: Joaquim Belarmino Cardoso Neto
  - Deputy Mayor: Iraci Gama

Area
  - Total: 707.558 km^{2} (273.190 sq mi)
- Elevation: 132 m (433 ft)

Population (2022 Census)
  - Total: 151,055
  - Estimate (2025): 161,196
  - Density: 213.488/km^{2} (552.931/sq mi)
- Demonym: Alagoinhense
- Time zone: UTC−3 (BRT)
- Website: https://www.alagoinhas.ba.gov.br

Alagoinhas (pronounced [alaˈɡojɲas]) is a city in the Brazilian state of Bahia. It is located at around 12°8′9″S 38°25′8″W. It was founded in 1852. In 1974, the city was made the seat of the Roman Catholic Diocese of Alagoinhas.

== Climate ==
Climate data for Alagoinhas (1991–2020)
Month	Jan	Feb	Mar	Apr	May	Jun	Jul	Aug	Sep	Oct	Nov	Dec	Year
Mean daily maximum °C (°F)	33.1 (91.6)	33.0 (91.4)	33.1 (91.6)	31.1 (88.0)	29.2 (84.6)	27.7 (81.9)	27.2 (81.0)	27.4 (81.3)	28.8 (83.8)	30.6 (87.1)	31.9 (89.4)	32.9 (91.2)	30.5 (86.9)
Daily mean °C (°F)	26.4 (79.5)	26.4 (79.5)	26.5 (79.7)	25.5 (77.9)	24.2 (75.6)	22.9 (73.2)	22.0 (71.6)	22.0 (71.6)	23.0 (73.4)	24.3 (75.7)	25.5 (77.9)	26.2 (79.2)	24.6 (76.3)
Mean daily minimum °C (°F)	21.3 (70.3)	21.5 (70.7)	21.6 (70.9)	21.3 (70.3)	20.4 (68.7)	19.2 (66.6)	18.1 (64.6)	17.8 (64.0)	18.5 (65.3)	19.4 (66.9)	20.6 (69.1)	21.3 (70.3)	20.1 (68.2)
Average precipitation mm (inches)	54.6 (2.15)	60.0 (2.36)	61.7 (2.43)	121.5 (4.78)	157.4 (6.20)	144.3 (5.68)	110.4 (4.35)	91.5 (3.60)	66.3 (2.61)	51.3 (2.02)	60.2 (2.37)	53.2 (2.09)	1,032.4 (40.65)
Average precipitation days (≥ 1.0 mm)	6	7	7	12	15	18	17	15	10	7	6	5	125
Average relative humidity (%)	73.6	75.8	75.5	81.4	85.5	87.1	85.9	84.6	81.1	77.5	74.7	73.1	79.7
Source: Instituto Nacional de Meteorologia
