= Goiana River =

River in Pernambuco, Brazil

- Location of mouth

Location
- Country: Brazil
- State: Pernambuco

Physical characteristics
- Mouth
  - coordinates: 7°33′11″S 34°49′58″W
  - elevation: 0 m (0 ft)

The Goiana River is a river in Pernambuco state of northeastern Brazil. It is formed by the confluence of the Tracunhaém and Capibaribe Mirim rivers, and drains eastward into the Atlantic Ocean.

The Goiana River marks the northern extent of the evergreen Pernambuco coastal forests.
