= Cosmas and Damian =

Patron saints of medicine and of twins

Saints Cosmas and Damian
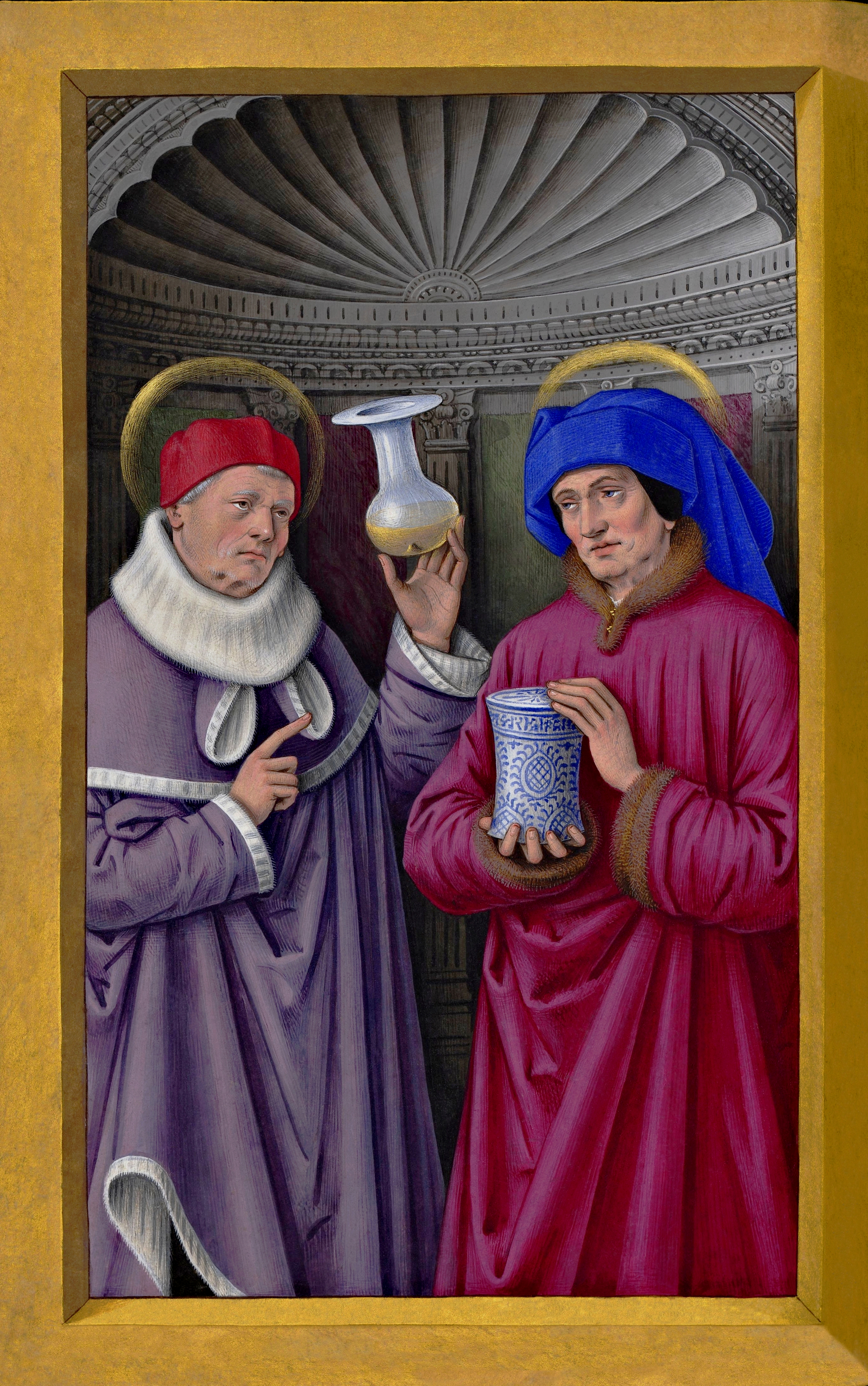
- Cosmas (left) and Damian (right) in the Grandes Heures of Anne of Brittany, c. 1503–1508

Martyrs
- Born: c. 3rd century AD; Arabia
- Died: c. 287 or c. 303; Aegea, Roman province of Cilicia (modern-day Yumurtalık, Adana, Turkey)
- Venerated in: Catholic Church; Eastern Orthodox Churches; Oriental Orthodox Churches; Anglican churches Lutheran churches
- Major shrine: Convent of the Poor Clares, Madrid; Basilica of Saints Cosmas and Damian, Rome; Basilica of the Holy Doctors Cosmos and Damian, Bitonto, Italy
- Feast: 25 September (Canada); 26 September (Catholic Church); 27 September (pre-1970 General Roman Calendar); 1 November (Eastern Orthodox Church)
- Attributes: Depicted as twins, beheaded, or with medical emblems
- Patronage: Surgeons, physicians, identical twins, twins, dentists, protectors of children, barbers, pharmacists, veterinarians, orphanages, day-care centers, confectioners, children in house, against hernia, against the plague.

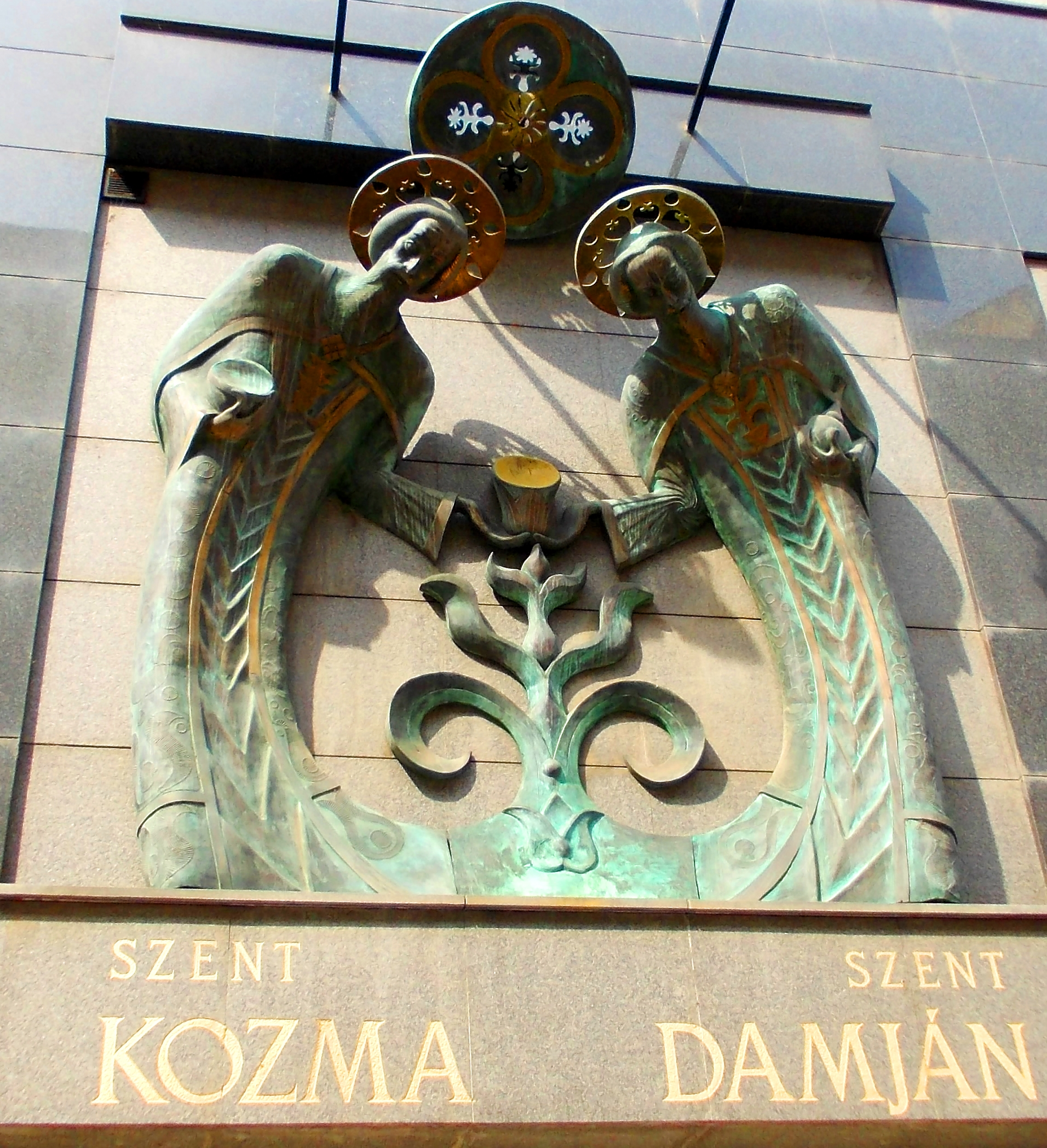
Saints Cosmas and Damian commemorative plaque in Budapest

Cosmas and Damian (Note: Arabic: قُزما ودميان, romanized: Qozma wa Dimyān; Ancient Greek: Κοσμᾶς καὶ Δαμιανός, romanized: Kosmás kai Damianós; Latin: Cosmas et Damianus) (c. 3rd century – c. 287 or c. 303 AD) were two Arab physicians and early Christian martyrs. They practised their profession in the seaport of Aegeae, then in the Roman province of Cilicia.

Cosmas and Damian were third century Arabian-born twin brothers who embraced Christianity and practiced medicine and surgery without a fee. This led them to being named anargyroi (from the Greek Ἀνάργυροι, "the silverless" or "unmercenaries"); by this, they attracted many to the Christian faith. They reputedly cured blindness, fever, paralysis and reportedly expelled a serpent. They were arrested by Lysias, governor of Cilicia (modern-day Çukurova, Turkey) during the Diocletian persecution because of their faith and fame as healers. Emperor Diocletian, who favoured the worship of the Olympian gods, issued a series of edicts that condemned the Christians with the goal of eliminating Christianity from the Roman Empire.

== Lives ==
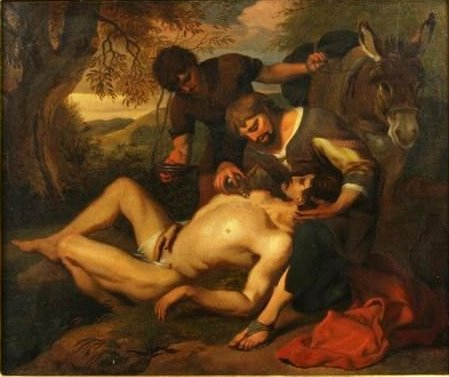
Saint Cosmas and Saint Damian, by Gerard Seghers (c. 17th century) , Private collection, U.S.

Nothing is known of their lives except that they suffered martyrdom in Syria during the persecution of the Emperor Diocletian. According to Christian traditions, the twin brothers were born in Arabia and became skilled doctors. They healed through incubation, curing their patients miraculously in sleep.

Saladino d'Ascoli, a 15th-century Italian physician, claims that the medieval electuary, a pasty mass consisting of a drug mixed with sugar and water or honey suitable for oral administration, known as opopira, a complex compound medicine used to treat diverse maladies including paralysis, was invented by Cosmas and Damian.

During the persecution under Diocletian, Cosmas and Damian were arrested by order of the Prefect of Cilicia, one Lysias who is otherwise unknown, who ordered them under torture to recant. However, according to legend they stayed true to their faith, enduring being hung on a cross, stoned, shot by arrows, and finally suffered execution by beheading. Anthimus, Leontius and Euprepius, their younger brothers, who were inseparable from them throughout life, shared in their martyrdom.

== Veneration ==
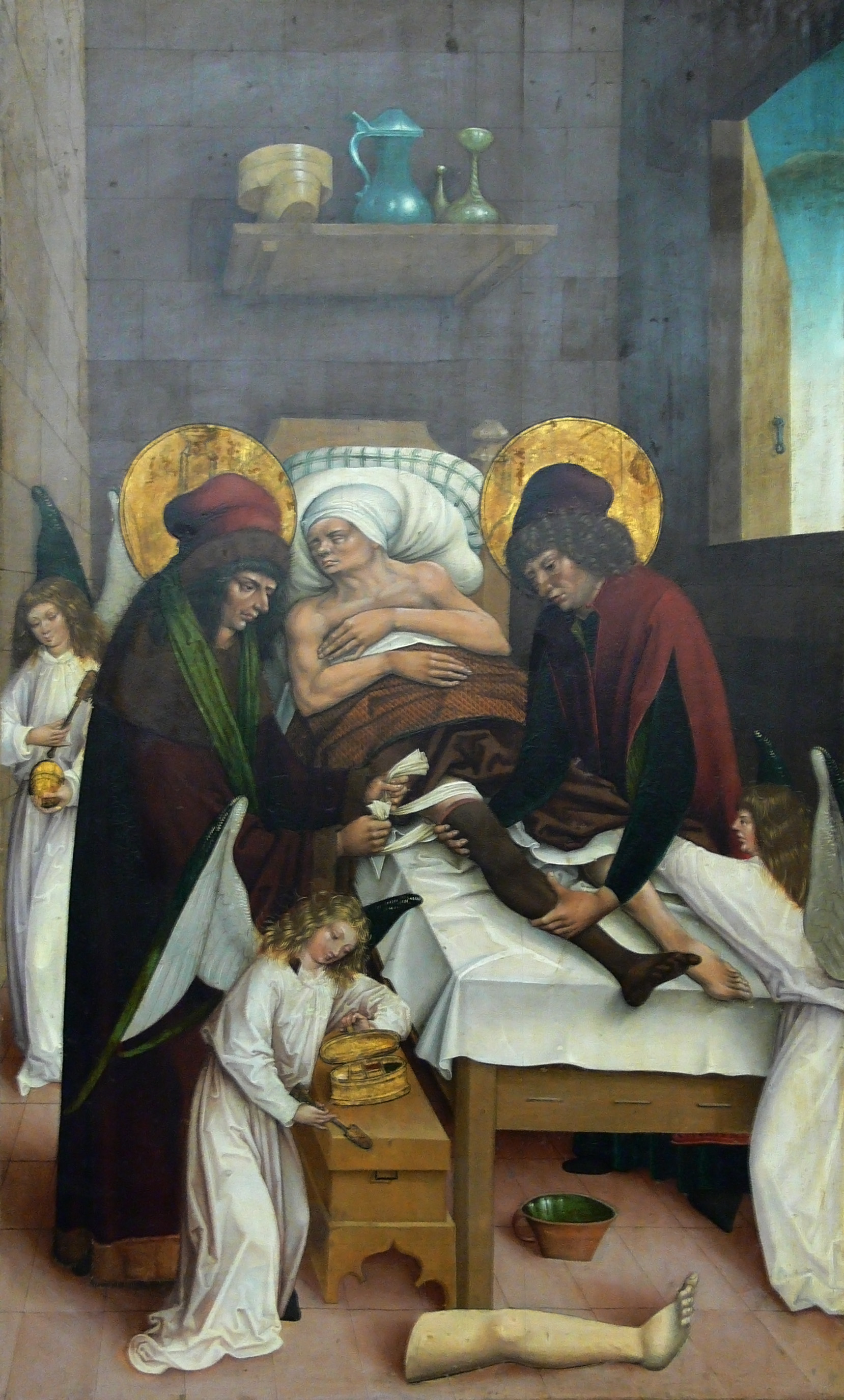
In Legendary transplantation of a leg by Saints Cosmas and Damian, assisted by angels (c. 16th century), Cosmas and Damian are depicted miraculously transplantating the black leg of an Ethiopian man to the white body of the patient.

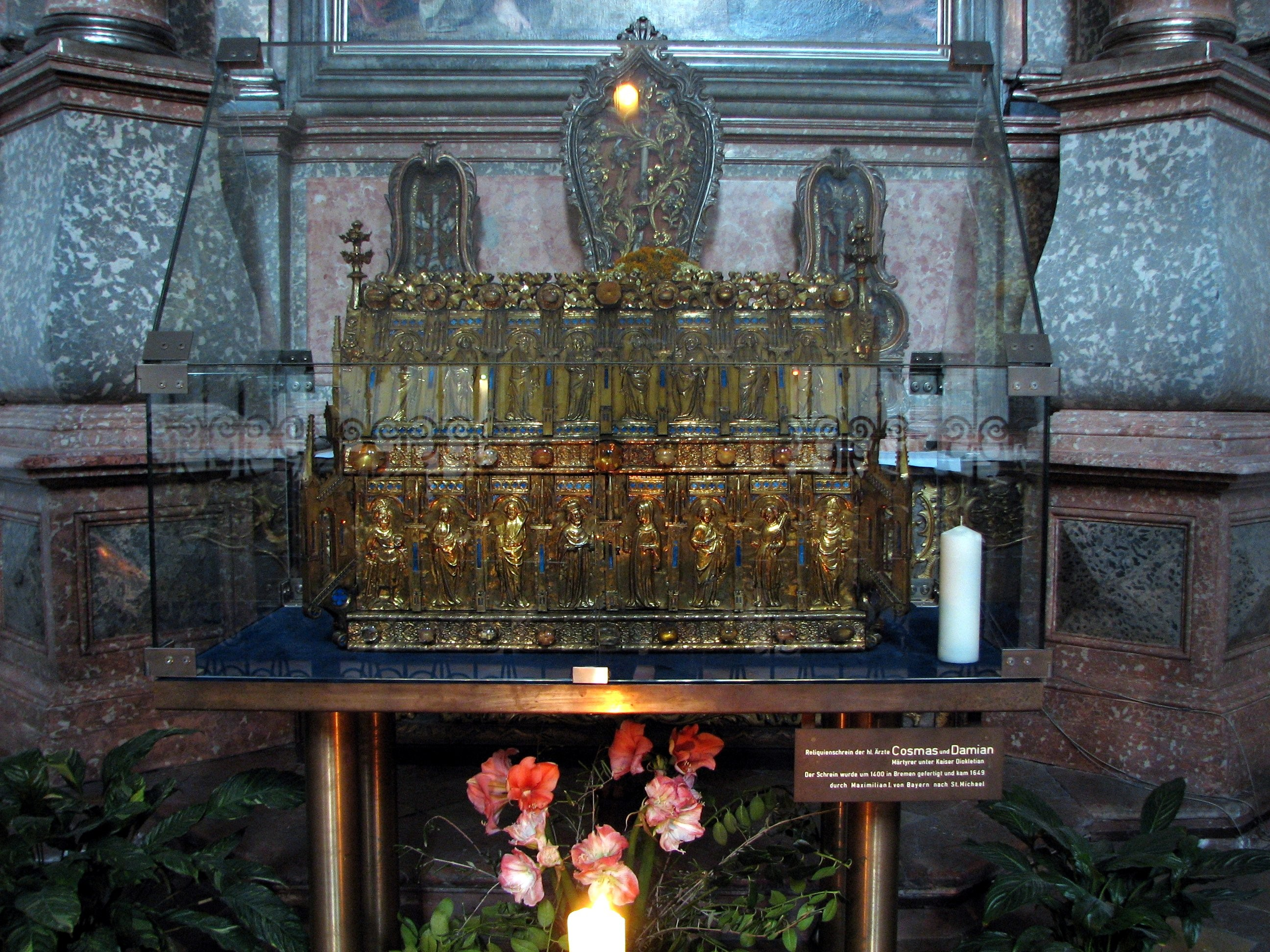
Reliquary (1400/1420) in St. Michael's Church, Munich, containing the alleged skulls of Cosmas and Damian. The convent of the Poor Clares in Madrid also has two skulls alleged to be those of Cosmas and Damian.

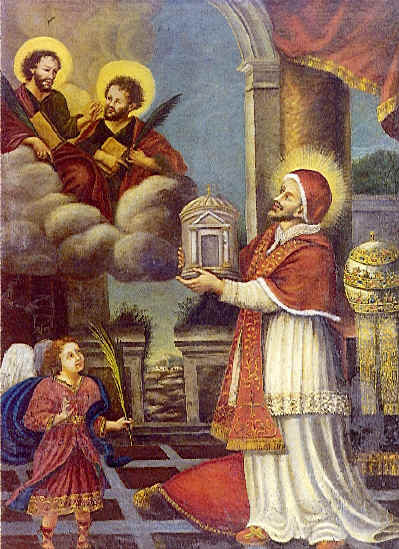
Pope Felix IV presents Saints Cosmas and Damian with the basilica he rededicated to them.

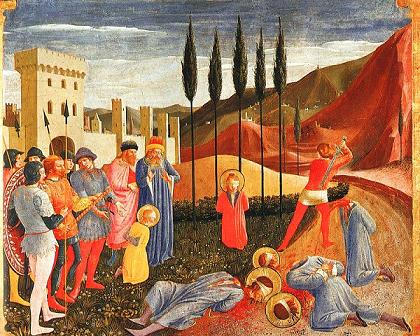
The martyrdom of Saints Cosmas and Damian by Fra Angelico (Musée du Louvre, Paris)

The veneration of Cosmas and Damian quickly spread beyond Constantinople; accounts of their martyrdom were rewritten by various authors such as Andrew of Crete, Peter the Wonderworker, Theodore II Laskaris, and a certain Maximus c. 1300. The legends are preserved also in Syriac, Coptic, Georgian, Armenian, and Latin.

As early as the 4th century, churches dedicated to the twin saints were established at Jerusalem, in Egypt and in Mesopotamia. Devotion to the two saints spread rapidly in both the East and the West. Theodoret records the division of their reputed relics. Their relics, deemed miraculous, were buried in the city of Cyrrhus in modern Syria. Churches were built in their honor by Archbishop Proclus of Constantinople and by Emperor Justinian I (527–565), who sumptuously restored the city of Cyrrhus and dedicated it to the twins, but brought their purported relics to Constantinople.

There, following his cure, ascribed to the intercession of Cosmas and Damian, Justinian, in gratitude also built and adorned their church at Constantinople, and it became a celebrated place of pilgrimage. At Rome, Pope Felix IV (526–530) rededicated the Library of Peace (Bibliotheca Pacis) as a basilica of Santi Cosma e Damiano in the Forum of Vespasian in their honour. The church is much rebuilt but still famed for its sixth-century mosaics illustrating the saints.

What are said to be their skulls are venerated in the Convent of Las Descalzas Reales of the Clares in Madrid, where they have been since 1581, the gift of Maria of Austria, Holy Roman Empress. They had previously been removed from Rome to Bremen in the tenth century, and thence to Bamberg. Other skulls said to be theirs were discovered in 1334 by Burchard Grelle, Archbishop of Bremen. He personally "miraculously" retrieved the relics of the holy physicians Cosmas and Damian, which were allegedly immured and forgotten in the choir of the Bremen Cathedral.

In celebration of the retrieval Archbishop and Chapter arranged a feast at Pentecost 1335, when the relics were translated from the wall to a more dignified place. Grelle claimed the relics were those Archbishop Adaldag brought from Rome in 965. The cathedral master-builder Johann Hemeling made a shrine for the relics, which was finished c. 1420. The shrine, made from carved oak wood covered with gilt and rolled silver is considered an important mediaeval gold work.

In 1649 Bremen's Chapter, Lutheran by this time, sold the shrine without the heads to Maximilian I, Elector of Bavaria. The two heads remained in Bremen and came into the possession of the small Roman Catholic community. They were shown from 1934 to 1968 in the Church of St. Johann and in 1994 they were buried in the crypt. The shrine is now shown in the Jesuit church of St Michael in Munich. At least since 1413 another supposed pair of skulls of the saints has been stored in St Stephens's Cathedral in Vienna. Other relics are claimed by the Church of San Giorgio Maggiore in Venice.

The martyr twins are invoked in the Canon of the Mass in the prayer known as the Communicantes (from the first Latin word of the prayer):

In communion with the whole Church, they venerate above all others the memory of the glorious ever-virgin Mary, Mother of our God and Lord, Jesus Christ, then of blessed Joseph, husband of the Virgin, your blessed Apostles and Martyrs, Peter and Paul, Andrew, James, ...John and Paul, Cosmas and Damian and all your Saints: grant through their merits and prayers that in all things we may be defended by the help of your protection.

They are also invoked in the Litany of the Saints, and in the older form of the Roman rite, in the Collect for Thursday in the Third Week of Lent, as the station church for this day is Santi Cosma e Damiano.

Their feast day in the General Roman Calendar, which had been on 27 September, was moved in 1969 to 26 September because 27 September is the dies natalis ("day of birth" into Heaven) of Vincent de Paul, now more widely venerated in the Latin Church. In Canada it has been moved to 25 September (as 26 September is the Feast of the Canadian Martyrs).

Sts Cosmas and Damian are regarded as the patrons of physicians, surgeons, and pharmacists and are sometimes represented with medical emblems. They are also regarded as the patron saints of twins.

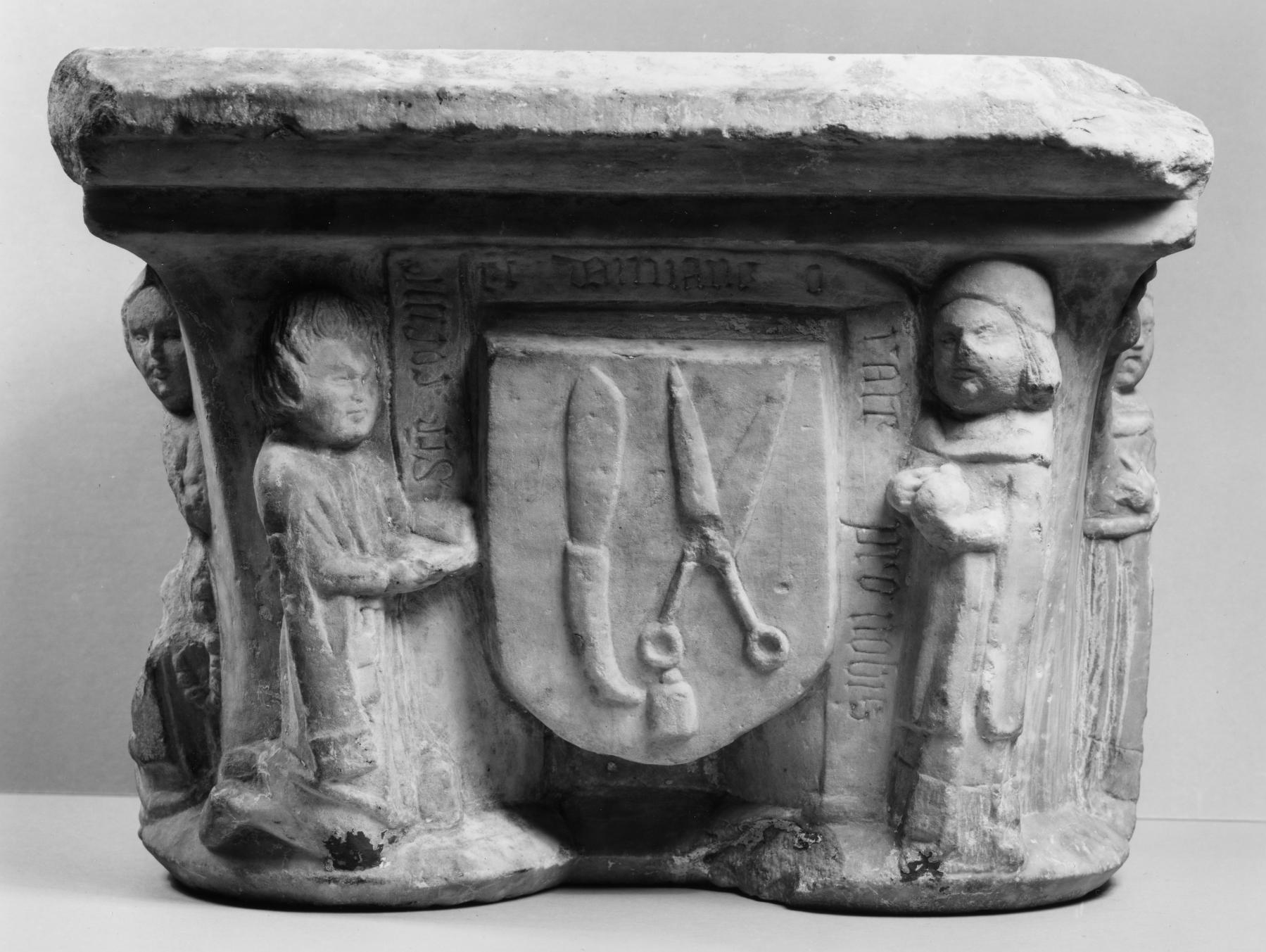
Cosmas and Damian are depicted as supporters of the arms of the guild of barber-surgeons carved into a capital, 15th century, from the Carmes monastery in Trie-sur-Baïse in southwestern France. The inscription reads, "Saints Cosmas and Damian pray for us".

In Brazil, the twin saints are regarded as protectors of children, and 27 September is commemorated, especially in Rio de Janeiro, by giving children bags of candy with the saints' effigy printed on them and throughout the entire state of Bahia where Catholics and adepts of Candomblé religion offer typical food such as caruru. The ritual consists of first offering the food to seven children that are no older than seven years old and then having them feast while sitting on the floor and eating with their hands. For adepts of Candomblé and Umbanda, the saints are syncretised with the Ibeji. The Church of Saints Cosmas and Damian, in Igarassu, Pernambuco is Brazil's oldest church, built in 1535.

In the UK, Damian is the dexter side supporter in the coat of arms of the British Dental Association.

Cosmas and Damian are venerated every year in Utica, New York, at St. Anthony's Parish during the annual pilgrimage which takes place on the last weekend of September (close to the 27 September feast day). Thousands of pilgrims who come to honor the saints from Canada and elsewhere. The two-day festival includes music, Italian food, masses and processions through the streets of East Utica. It is one of the largest festivals honoring saints in the Northeastern United States.

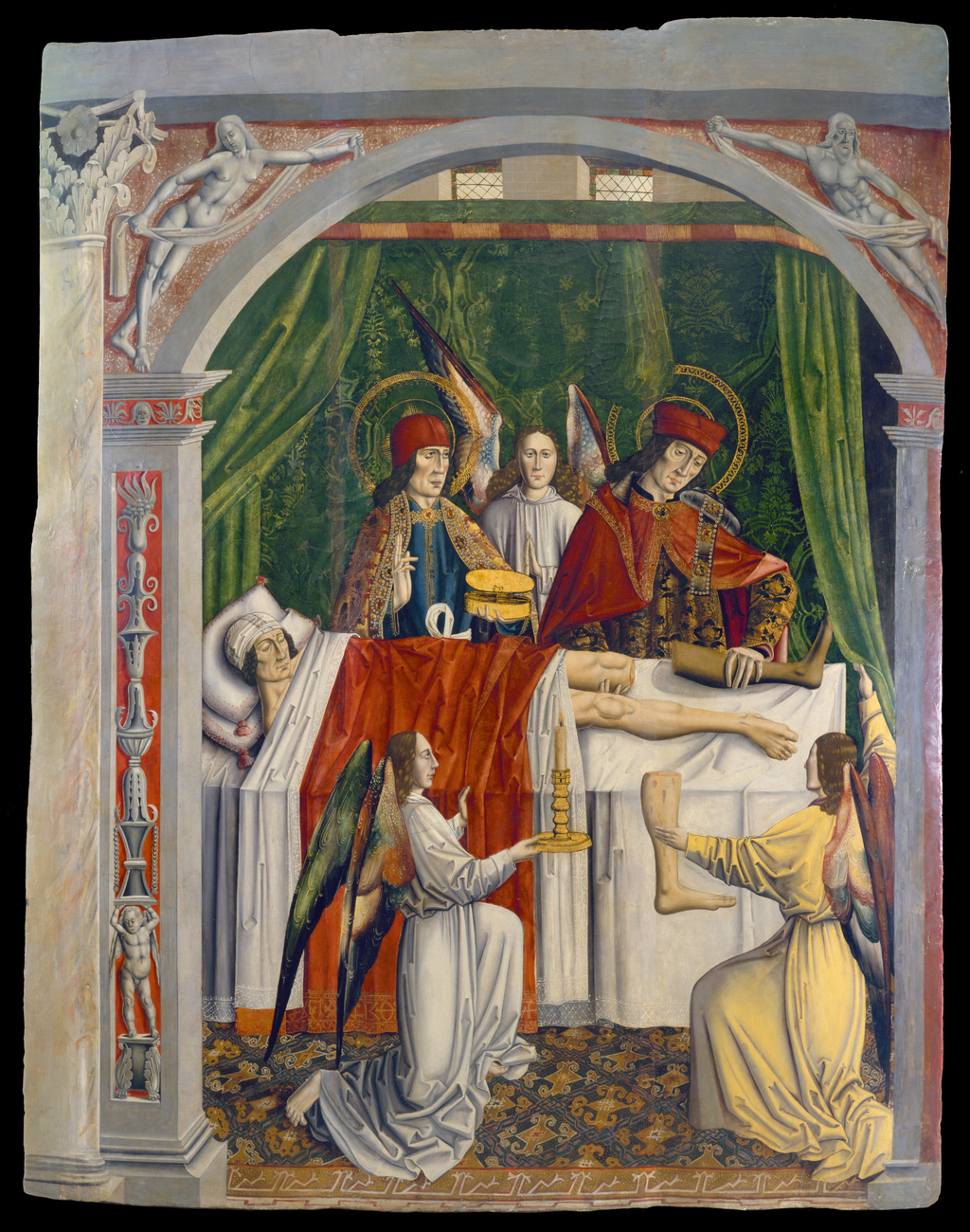
Saints Cosmas and Damian performing a miraculous cure by transplantation of a leg. Oil painting attributed to the Master of Los Balbases, c. 1495.

They are associated with the Miracle of the Black Leg, where they posthumously transplant a diseased limb of a white church verger with that of a deceased Ethiopian man.

== Eastern Christianity ==
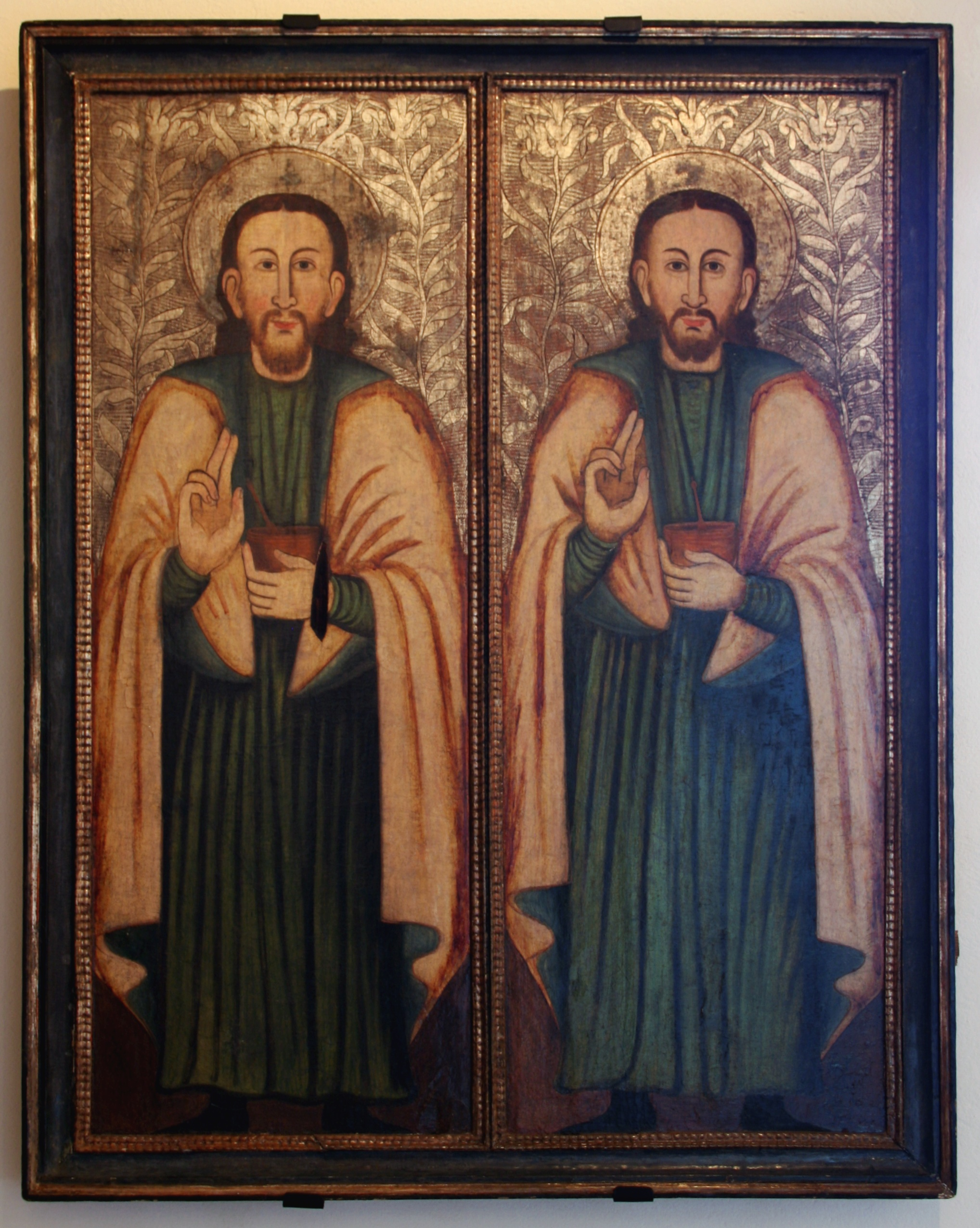
Icon of Saints Cosmas and Damian (17th century, Historic Museum in Sanok, Poland)

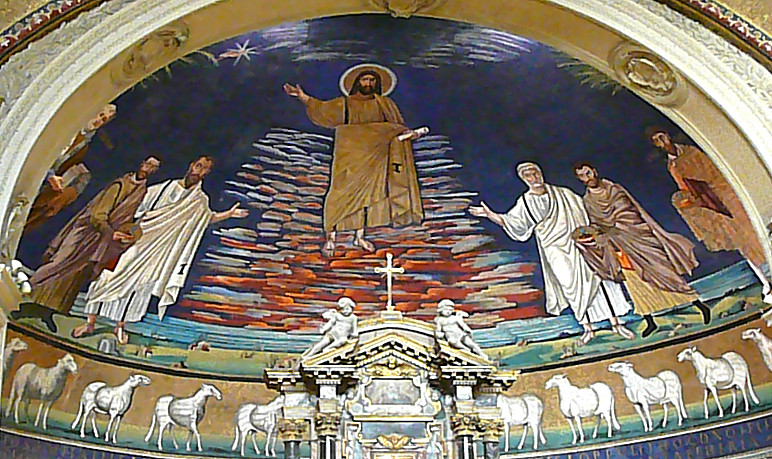
The Apse of the Church of SS. Cosmas and Damian, Rome, 7th century, Paul and Peter present the martyrs to Christ.

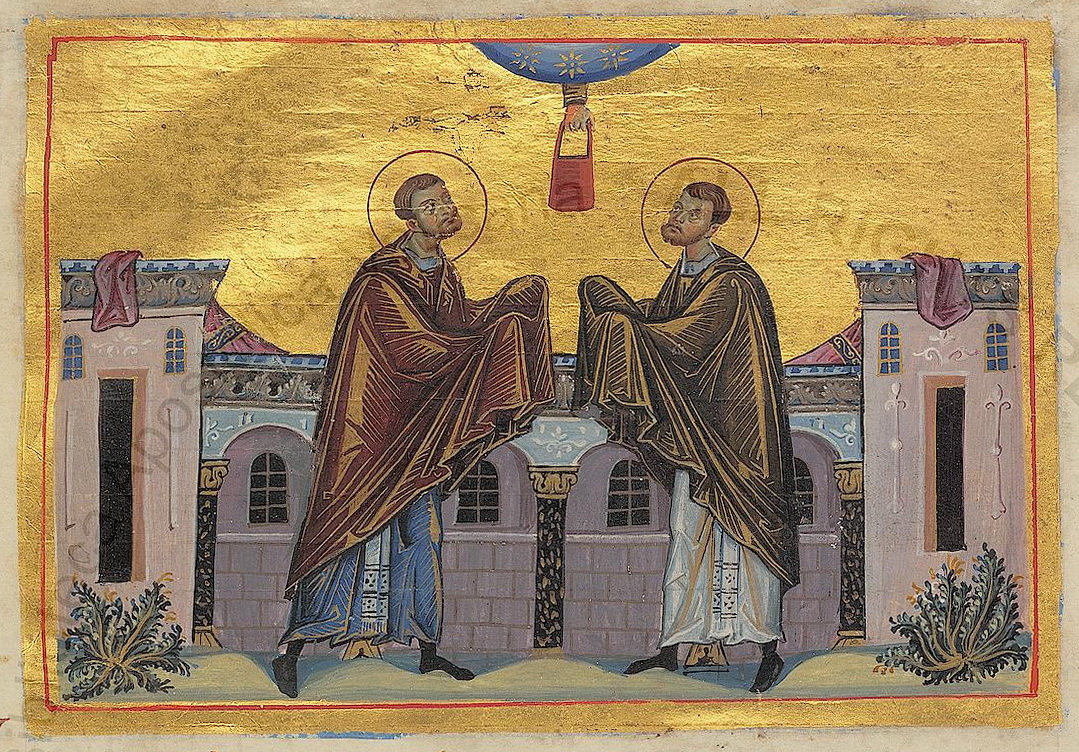
Cosmas and Damian depicted in the Menologion of Basil II

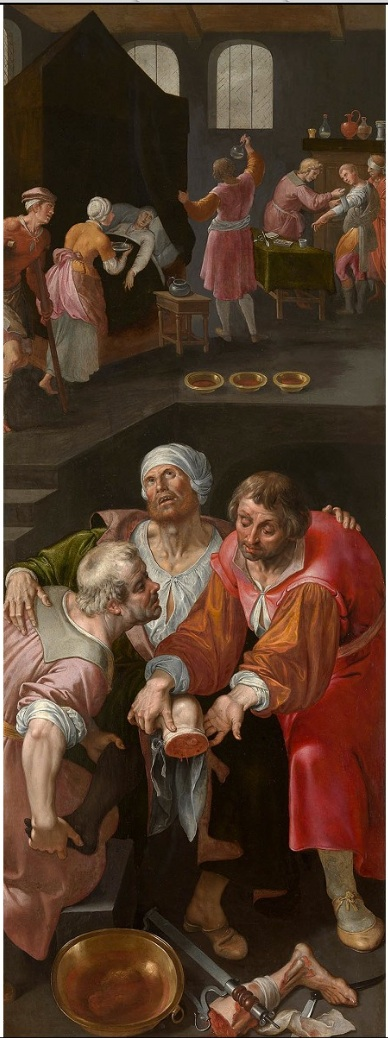
The Charity of Saints Cosmas and Damian by Ambrosius Francken I

In the Eastern Orthodox Church, Eastern Catholic Churches, and the Oriental Orthodox Churches, Cosmas and Damian are venerated as a type of saint known as Unmercenary Physicians (Greek: ἀνάργυροι, anargyroi, "without money"). This classification of saints is unique to the Eastern Church and refers to those who heal purely out of love for God and man, strictly observing the command of Jesus: "Freely have you received, freely give", («Δωρεὰν ἐλάβετε, δωρεὰν δότε...» Matthew 10:8) While each of the Unmercenaries has his own feast days, all are commemorated together on the first Sunday in November, in a feast known as the Synaxis of the Unmercenary Physicians.

The Orthodox celebrate no less than three different sets of saints by the name of Cosmas and Damian, each with their own distinct feast day:

- Saints Cosmas and Damian of Cilicia (Arabia) (17 October) Brothers, according to Christian legend they were beaten and beheaded together with three other Christians: Leontius, Anthimus, and Eutropius.
- Saints Cosmas and Damian of Asia Minor — alternately of Mesopotamia (1 November) Twin sons of Theodota of Philippi. Died peacefully and were buried together at Thereman in Mesopotamia.
- Saints Cosmas and Damian of Rome (1 July) Brothers, according to Christian tradition they were martyred outside Rome by a jealous pagan physician during the reign of the Roman Emperor Carinus (283–285).

Orthodox icons of the saints depict them vested as laymen holding medicine boxes. Often each will also hold a spoon with which to dispense medicine. The handle of the spoon is normally shaped like a cross to indicate the importance of spiritual as well as physical healing, and that all cures come from God.

== Churches ==
=== Australia ===
- St Mary & Sts Cozman and Demian Coptic Orthodox Church
- St Damians Catholic Church, Bundoora, Victoria
- Sts Anargiri, Greek Orthodox Church, Oakleigh, Victoria
- Agioi Anargiri Greek Orthodox Church, Sydney, New South Wales

=== Brazil ===
- Church of Saints Cosme and Damião, Igarassu, Pernambuco
- Sts. Cosmas and Damian Orthodox Church, Rio de Janeiro, Rio de Janeiro (state)

=== Bulgaria ===
- Sandanski Monastery "Sveti Sveti Kozma i Damyan"
- Kuklen Monastery "Sveti Sveti Kozma i Damyan"
- Gigintsi Monastery "St.St. Bezsrebrenitsi Kosma and Damyan"
- Church of "St.St. Bezsrebrenitsi Kosma and Damyan", Sandanski
- Church of "St.St. Bezsrebrenitsi Kosma and Damyan", Svetovrachane
- Church of "St.St. Bezsrebrenitsi Kosma and Damyan", Plovdiv
- Church of "St.St. Bezsrebrenitsi Kosma and Damyan", Smolyan area
- Church of "St.St. Bezsrebrenitsi Kosma and Damyan", Belashtitsa
- Church of "St.St. Bezsrebrenitsi Kosma and Damyan", Krichim

=== Canada ===
- Church of Saint-Côme, Matawinie Regional County Municipality, Québec
- Église St-Damien, Saint Damien, Québec

=== China ===
- Saints Cosmas and Damian Church (Hong Kong)

=== Croatia ===
- Church of Saints Cosmas and Damian, Lastovo
- Church of Saints Cosmas and Damian, Kuzminec
- Sv. Kuzman i Damjan, Polaća

=== Egypt ===
- 4th Century Monastery of Saints Cosmas and Demian, Manil Shihah, Giza

=== Spain ===
- Church of Saint Cosme and Saint Damián (Arnedo, Rioja)

=== England ===
- Blean, Kent, church of St Cosmus [sic] and St Damian
- Challock, Kent
- Keymer, Sussex, St Cosmas and St Damian Church
- Sherrington, Wiltshire, church of St Cosmo [sic] and St Damian
- Stretford church, near Leominster, Herefordshire, church no longer in use and in the care of the Churches Conservation Trust
- Gospel Oak, north London, Greek Orthodox Church of St Cosmas and Damian (at 1 Gordon House Road, London NW5)

=== France ===
- Saint Côme-Saint Damien church, Luzarches, Val-d'Oise
- Saint Côme-Saint Damien church, Paris
- Saint Côme-Saint Damien church, Chamboulive
- Saint Côme-Saint Damien church, Serdinya
- Saint-Côme-et-Saint-Damien, Angoville-au-Plain

=== Germany ===
- Essen Cathedral, Essen

=== Goa ===
- Igreja dos Santos Cosme e Damião, Bogmalo

=== Greece ===
- 10th-century chapel of Agioi Anargyroi in the town of Servia
- 11th-century church in the city of Kastoria

=== Hungary ===
- Szent Kozma és Damján templom, Vát

=== Hong Kong ===
- SS. Cosmas & Damian Catholic Church, Tsuen Wan

=== Italy ===
- Basilica of Santi Medici e Martiri Cosma e Damiano; Alberobello, Puglia
- Santi Cosma e Damiano, Alcamo, church in Alcamo
- Basilica of the Holy Doctors Cosmos and Damian, Bitonto
- Santi Cosma e Damiano, Brescia, church in Brescia
- Santi Cosma e Damiano, Crosa, church in Crosa, Italy Lessona|Piedmonte
- Santi Cosma e Damiano, Genoa, church in Genoa
- Santi Cosma e Damiano, Isernia, church in Isernia
- Sanctuary of San Cosimo alla Macchia in Oria, Apulia

San Cosimo alla Macchia

- Santi Cosma e Damiano, Persico, church in Persico
- Santi Cosma e Damiano, Rome, church in Rome, titular church of a cardinal deacon
- Santi Cosma e Damiano a Porta Nolana, church in Naples
- Santi Cosma e Damiano ai Banchi Nuovi, church in Naples

=== Kenya ===
- Orthodox Cathedral of Saints Anargyroi, Nairobi

=== North Macedonia ===
- Sv. Kuzman i Damjan Ohrid
- Sv. Kuzman i Damjan Jedoarce, Tetovo
- Sv. Kuzman i Damjan Govrlevo, Skopje
- Sv. Kuzman i Damjan Triangla, Skopje
- Sv. Kuzman i Damjan Bolnicka Crkva, Veles (Sveti Besrebrenici Kozma i Damjan)
- Sv. "Kuzman i Damjan" - Strumica (Sveti bessrebrenici Kozma i Damjan)

=== Mexico ===
- Saint Cosmas and Damian Church, Mazatecochco, Tlaxcala
- Saint Cosmas and Damian Church, Xaloztoc, Tlaxcala
- Saint Cosmas and Damian Church, San Damián Texoloc, Tlaxcala
- San Cosme y Damián Church, Villa de Cos, Zacatecas

=== Paraguay ===
- Misión jesuítica de San Cosme y Damián

=== Poland ===
- Church of Saints Cosmas and Damian, Kolechowice

=== Russia ===
- Church of Cosmas and Damian, Novgorod

=== Serbia ===
- Church of Saints Cosmas and Damian, Ivanjica
- Church of St. Cosmas and Damian, Futog
- Zočište Monastery, Kosovo

=== Slovakia ===
- Kostol sv. Kozmu a Damiána, Bratislava - Dúbravka
- Kostol sv. Kozmu a Damiána, Trenčín - Biskupice
- Kostol sv. Kozmu a Damiána, Kšinná

=== Syria ===
- Sts. Cosmas and Damian of the Melkite Greek Catholic Church, Ar-Rudaymah

=== United States ===
- Mission San Cosme y Damián de Tucsón, Tucson, Arizona
- Ss. Cosmas & Damian Church, Punxsutawney, Pennsylvania
- Chapel of Saint Cosmas & Damiano; Utica, New York
- Chapel of Saint Cosmas & Damian; Flushing, New York
- Saints Cosmas and Damian Society, Cambridge, Massachusetts
- Saint Cosmas & Damiano Society of St. Anthony & St. Agnes Church, Utica, New York
- Saint Damian, Oak Forest, Illinois
- Ss. Cosmas & Damian Church, Twinsburg, Ohio
- Ss. Cosmas & Damian Church, Conshohocken, Pennsylvania (closed 2014)
- Sts. Anargyroi Greek Orthodox Church, Marlborough, Massachusetts
- Saints Cosmas-Damian Catholic, Orting, Washington
