= Chapel of Our Lady of Deliverance =

Church in Igarassu, Pernambuco, Brazil

- Capela de Nossa Senhora do Livramento
- Location of the Chapel of Our Lady of Deliverance in Brazil

Religion
- Affiliation: Catholic
- Rite: Roman Rite
- Ownership: Roman Catholic Archdiocese of Olinda e Recife
- Patron: Our Lady of Deliverance
- Status: Active

Location
- Municipality: Igarassu
- State: Pernambuco
- Country: Brazil
- Interactive map of Chapel of Our Lady of Deliverance
- Coordinates: 7.833100730687138°S 34.90681542994096°W

Architecture
- Style: Baroque
- Completed: 1774

National Historic Heritage of Brazil
- Designated: 1951
- Reference no.: 359

The Chapel of Our Lady of Deliverance (Portuguese: Capela de Nossa Senhora do Livramento) is a Catholic church located in the city of Igarassu, Pernambuco, Brazil. The church dates to 1774 and is part of the historic center of the city. The church is dedicated to Saints Cosmas and Damian and belongs to the Roman Catholic Archdiocese of Olinda and Recife. The church was listed as a historic structure by the National Historic and Artistic Heritage Institute in 1951.

== History ==
The chapel was completed in 1774. It was built on land belonging to the municipality of Igarassu. It was completed eight years later. Joaquim Rodrigues da Costa Queimado, a local judge, ordered the formation of a brotherhood, the Irmandade de Nossa Senhora do Livramento dos Homens Pardos, a brotherhood of mixed-race citizens, to maintain the church. The church was heavily damaged by wind and rain in 1958. A portion of the ceiling structure collapsed; the chapel was subsequently restored between 1972 and 1984.

== Structure ==
The Chapel of Our Lady of Deliverance has an ornated baroque-style façade with a single portal at ground level. There are two windows at the choir level, both with wooden balusters. A niche sits between the windows at choir level. The chapel has a heavy, ornate pediment with volutes, an oculus at center, and pinnacles at both sides. The pediment is surmounted by a cross. The bell tower is located in the body of the church itself and not visible from the façade.

== See also ==
- Church and Convent of Saint Antony
- Church of São Cosme e São Damião
