= Church and Convent of Saint Antony =

Church in Igarassu, Pernambuco, Brazil

- Igreja e Convento de Santo António
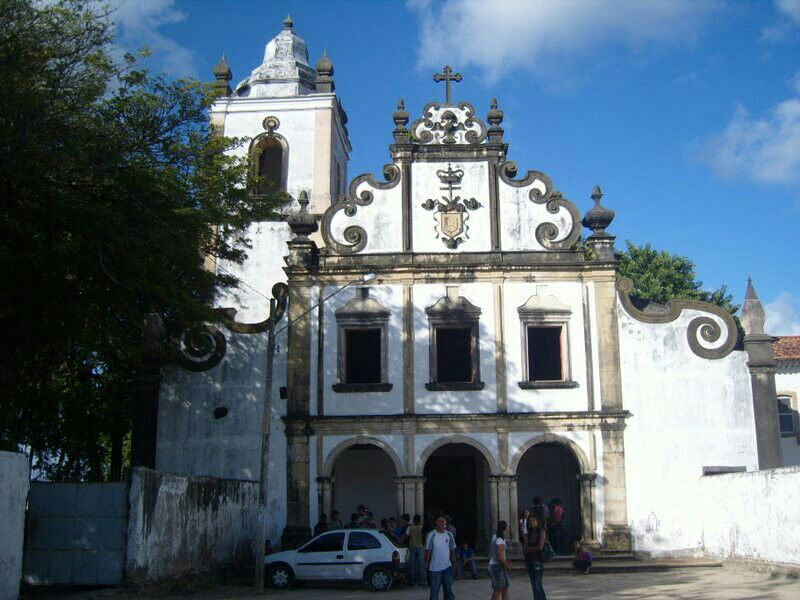
- Façade of Church and Convent of Saint Antony

- Location of the Church and Convent of Saint Antony in Brazil

Religion
- Affiliation: Catholic
- Rite: Roman Rite
- Ownership: Roman Catholic Archdiocese of Olinda e Recife
- Patron: Saint Anthony

Location
- Municipality: Igarassu
- State: Pernambuco
- Country: Brazil
- Interactive map of Church and Convent of Saint Antony
- Coordinates: 7.832493777530503°S 34.90499573430832°W

Architecture
- Style: Baroque

National Historic Heritage of Brazil
- Designated: 1938
- Reference no.: 131

The Church and Convent of Saint Antony (Portuguese: Igreja e Convento de Santo António) is a 17th-century Roman Catholic church located in Igarassu, Pernambuco, Brazil. It was constructed by the Franciscans during the settlement of Pernambuco, and was the third Franciscan convent in Brazil. It was destroyed during the Dutch occupation of Brazil and is dedicated to is dedicated to Saint Anthony. The church was rebuilt late in the 16th century and sits adjacent to the Church of Saints Cosme and Damião, the oldest functioning church in Brazil. It was designated a historic structure by National Institute of Historic and Artistic Heritage (IPHAN) in 1938. The church and convent are located in the Historic Center of Igarassu, itself protected as an urban architectural ensemble since 1972.

== History ==
=== Early history ===
The Franciscans arrived in Brazil in the 16th century. They built their first convent and church in Pernambuco 1585 at Olinda on a site now occupied by the Church of Our Lady of the Snows and Franciscan Convent. This was followed by the Church and Convent of São Francisco in Salvador in 1587. The date of construction of the first Church and Convent of Saint Antony is uncertain, but the art historian Germain Bazin dates it to 1588. Igarassu became the second-most important city in Pernambuco before the Dutch occupation of Brazil.

=== Dutch occupation ===
The church and convent were pillaged during the Dutch occupation of Brazil from 1630 to 1654. The church was first attacked and pillaged on May 1, 1632 during mass, and reoccupied in 1635. The Franciscan monks were arrested in 1639 for maintaining contact with Franciscans in Salvador, Bahia. They were deported to the Itamaraca Island. The church and convent were abandoned until 1654 with the departure of the Dutch.

The church and convent appear in an engraving by the Dutch humanist Caspar Barlaeus (1584–1648). Barlaeus published Rerum per octennium in Brasilia et alibi nuper gestarum sub praefectura in 1647, which included an engraving of the Church and Convent of Saint Antony among a collection of maps, cityscapes, and landscapes. The Dutch artist Frans Post (1612–1680) depicted the church and convent in a painting now located in the Silesian Museum of Fine Arts in Breslau, Germany. Dutch documentation describe a church and convent with all of the characteristics of a Franciscan convent of the period.

=== Later history ===
The church and convent were in a state of advanced ruin after the Dutch occupation. The friar and superior Eusébio da Expectação planned a reconstruction of the church between 1661 and 1665. These were likely completed in 1693, and includes a cloister resembling those of other Franciscan convents in Northeast Brazil. Further work between 1705 and 1718 included the monumental façade. The façade and plan of the reconstructed Igarassu church and convent closely resembles those in Bahia: the Church and Convent of Saint Antony and Chapel of the Third Order in São Francisco do Conde (1629); the Convent and Church of Saint Anthony in Cairu (1650); and the Convent and Church of Saint Antony in Cachoeira (1658).

A school for novices was established in the 17th century.

The church and convent were used as a headquarters by revolutionary troops in the Praieira Revolution in 1848. It was then used by the Congregation of Our Lady of Charity of Good Shepherd, of Angers, France, which maintained a school under the auspices of the state of Pernambuco. It now houses the Pinacoteca Museum of Igarassu (Museu Pinacoteca de Igarassu).

== Structure ==
The Church and Convent of Saint Antony is built in the Franciscan Baroque style of colonial Brazil.

The façade of the church in Igarassu dates to 1660 and was subsequently renovated. It is divided into three parts horizontally and five parts vertically. The lower horizontal level has a galilee porch with three arches and a single door to the church nave. The second level has three rectangular windows at the choir level above the entrance with red shutters. A monumental pediment over the lower levels has volutes, pinnacles, and is surmounted by a cross. The pediment maintains a monogram of the Portuguese Crown and another of the Holy Spirit.

The vertical sections of the façade are divided by pilasters, with the outermost sections surmounted by volutes. The bell tower sits recessed from façade, and is topped by pyramid, tiled pediment. The windows of the bell tower are of a different design than those of the façade. Germain Bazin links its construction to that of the Franciscan Third Order chapel, built between 1753 and 1762 on the north side of the church.

A large cross on a pedestal is located in the churchyard, a feature common to Franciscan convents in Brazil. It is smaller and simpler than the monumental crucifix of the Church and Convent of São Francisco in Salvador or the Franciscan convents in Cachoeira and Cairu.

=== Interior ===
A renovation in the mid-18th century resulted in the addition of richly designed interior design elements. It has a large number of panels of azulejos similar to those found across Franciscan colonial churches across Brazil. The interior also has a collection of baroque woodcarving and gilding, and fine carved furniture. The barrel vault of the nave has a large ceiling painting by an anonymous artist; it depicts the lives of the Franciscan saints Bernardino of Siena, Didacus of Alcalá, Paschal Baylón, and Peter de Regalado. The wall segments of the nave are curved, an architectural feature rare in the Northeast region of Brazil. The sacristy is likewise richly decorated. It has a large lavabo, a basin for hand washing, made of lioz marble imported from Portugal.

=== Convent ===
The convent has two floors with windows and doors with straight lintels on the ground floor. The upper floor has windows surmounted by a half depressed arch.

=== Third Order chapel ===
The Third Order Brotherhood of Saint Francis was founded in 1753. The brotherhood built a chapel in the same year, with its foundation stone dated November 15, 1753; the structure was completed in 1762. The chapel was built perpendicular to the north side of the First Order church, but was destroyed and is now lost.

== Pinacoteca Museum of Igarassu ==
The Pinacoteca Museum of Igarassu opened at the church and convent in 1957. It houses one of the most important collections of Franciscan art in Latin America. It includes 24 paintings from the 17th and 18th centuries, notably those from the Church of São Cosme e São Damião in Igarassu. Four paintings depict an epidemic that devastated Pernambuco in 1685.

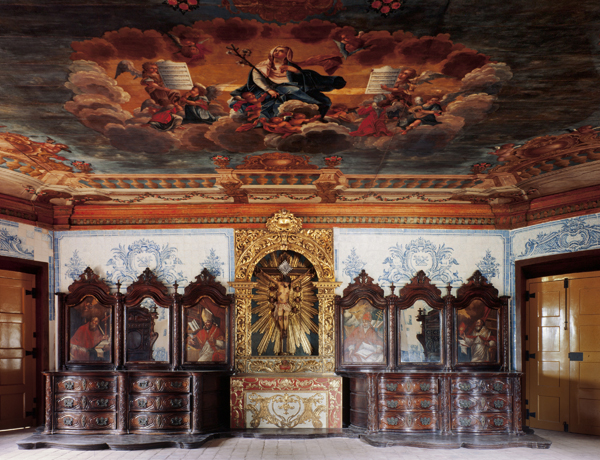
Sacristy

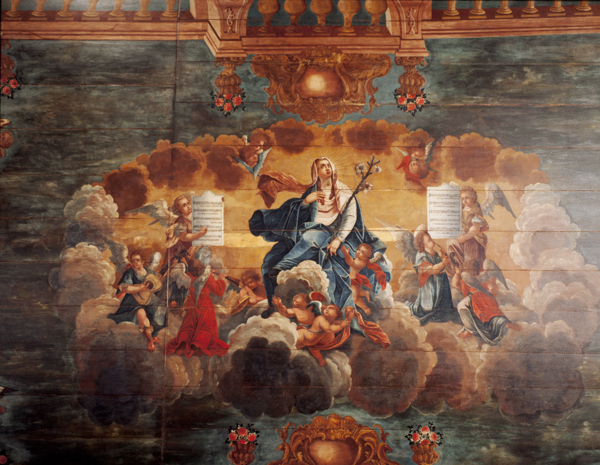
Painting of the sacristy ceiling

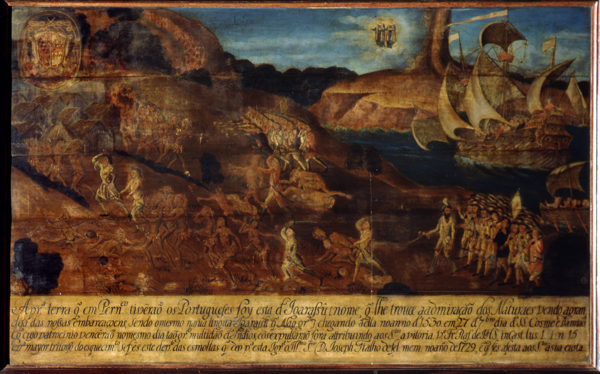
Arrival of the Portuguese

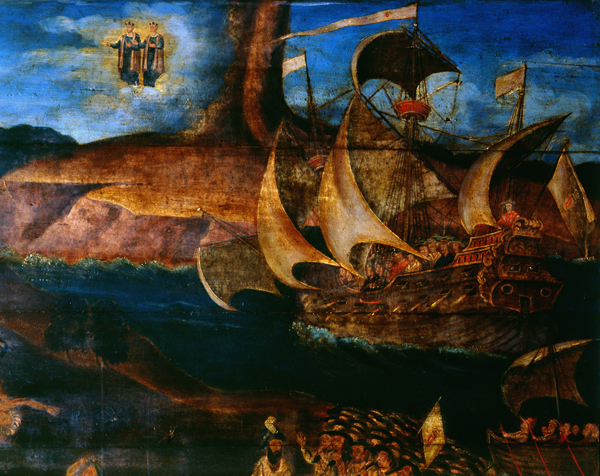

== Protected status ==
The Church and Convent of Saint Antony was listed as a historic structure by the National Institute of Historic and Artistic Heritage in 1938. It is listed in the Book of Historical Works process no. 131.

== See also ==
- Church of São Cosme e São Damião
- Chapel of Our Lady of Deliverance
