= Saints Cosmas and Damian Church (Hong Kong) =

Coordinates: 22°22′09″N 114°07′09″E

- 葛達二聖堂
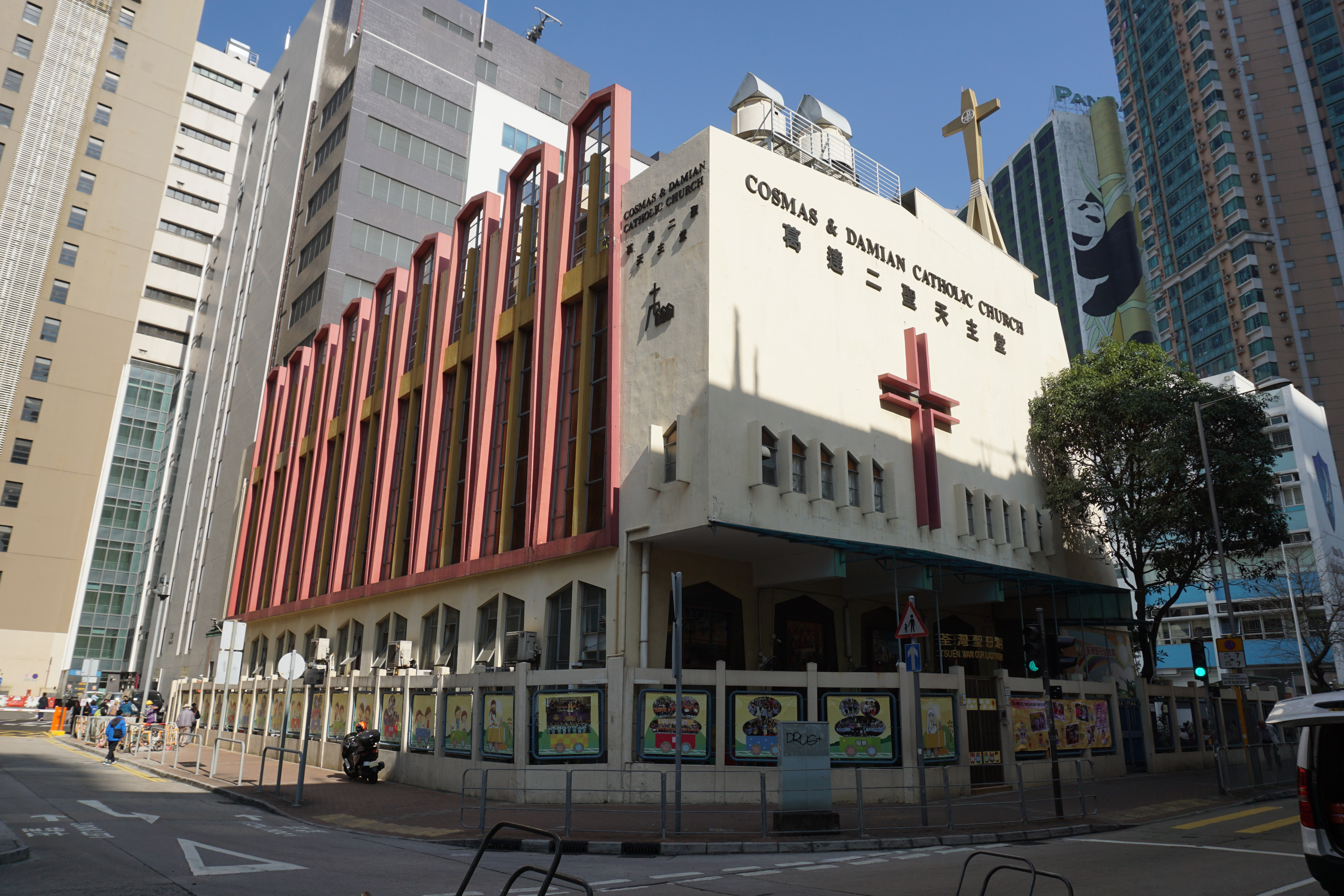
- Saints Cosmas and Damian Church
- Location: No. 37-41 Tak Wah Street, Tsuen Wan, Hong Kong
- Website: cosdam.catholic.org.hk

History
- Former name: Church of the Sacred Heart of Jesus
- Status: Parish Church
- Founded: July 1969; 56 years ago
- Consecrated: 26 December 1971; 54 years ago

Administration
- Diocese: Hong Kong

Clergy
- Bishop: Stephen Chow
- Priest: Matthieu Masson MEP

Saints Cosmas and Damian Church (Chinese: 葛達二聖堂) is a Roman Catholic church located in Tsuen Wan, New Territories, Hong Kong.

== History ==
The origin of Saints Cosmas and Damian Church was the Church of the Sacred Heart of Jesus established in 1934. With the government’s effort to build satellite towns, population increased tremendously in Tsuen Wan. Hence the church in Sam Tung Uk (current site of Luk Yeung Sun Chuen) became inadequate to serve the community and the Diocese had to plan for a new parish to cope with the need.

Saints Cosmas and Damian Church was completed in 1969 with the generous donation from Essen Diocese in Germany. To pay due respect to their donors, the church adopted the patron saint of the Essen Diocese and its main church, i.e. SS. Cosmas and Damian, as their patron.

The church was officially opened and consecrated in 26 December 1971 by the Bishop of Essen, the Most Reverend Franz Hengsbach.

== Treasures ==
=== Relic of St. Teresa of Calcutta ===
On 5 February 2012. The relic of St. Teresa of Calcutta, which is a small cloth with her blood, was placed in the side wall of the church by Cardinal John Tong Hon, the Bishop of Hong Kong.

== See also ==
- List of Catholic churches in Hong Kong
