= Church of Saints Cosmas and Damian, Ivanjica =

Serbian Orthodox church near Budoželja, Serbia

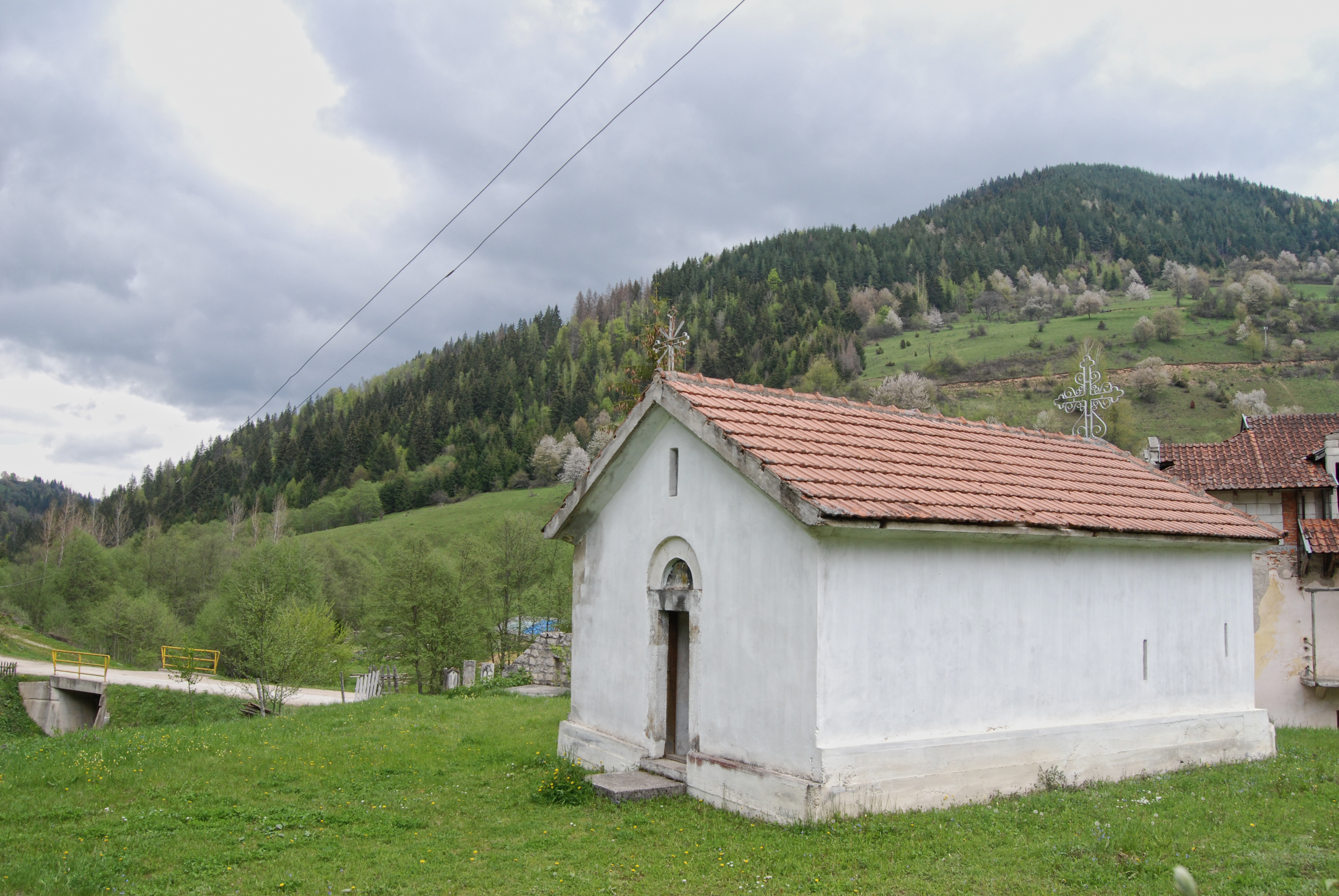
Church of Saints Cosmas and Damian

Church of Saints Cosmas and Damian is a church of the Serbian Orthodox Church, located in the Ostatija–Koritnik mountain Golia near the village Budoželja, Ivanjica. It is a medieval historical and cultural monument in Serbia. The church belongs to the Eparchy of Žiča. It was located in the middle of a necropolis.

The church was built in the 17th century and is believed to have been built during the Ottoman rule. It was first restored in the 18th century, whereas the most recent restoration was carried out in 1937.

== Architecture ==
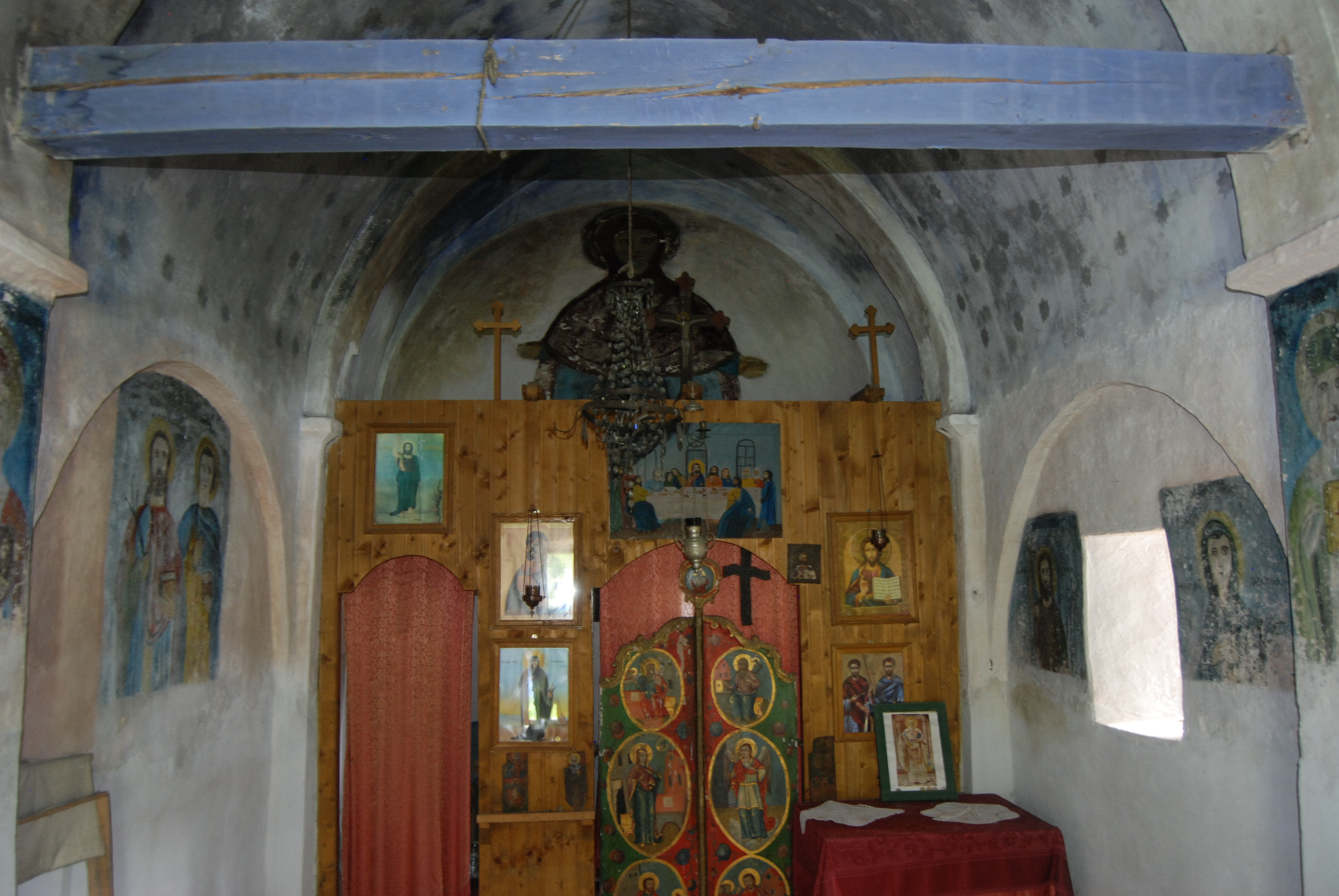
Interior of the church

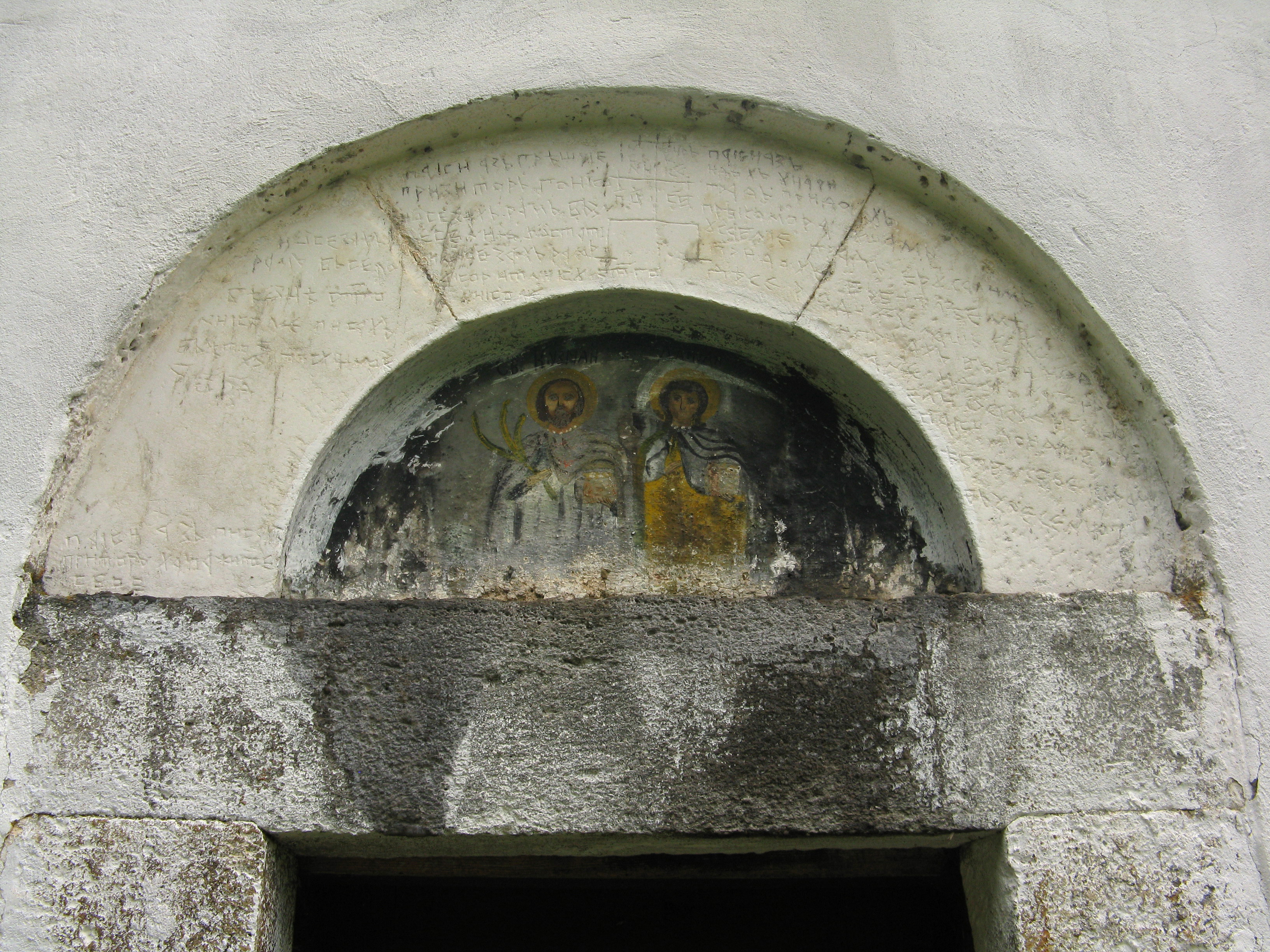
The icon of St. Cosmas and Damian above the entrance to the church

Church of Sts. Cosmas and Damian is a simple, single-naved building with a semicircular altar apse. It is built in rubble and plastered inside and out. During the restoration of the church in 1937, large window frames were made. The vault was reinforced with concrete beams, and the roof was covered with tiles.

The church is noted for its lavishly decorated portal, which is decorated with geometric ornaments which reveal a strong Oriental influence. A large number of inscriptions from various periods in the history of the church are preserved on the doorpost.
