= Church of São Cosme e São Damião =

Church in Igarassu, Brazil

Church of Saints Cosme and Damião
- Igreja Matriz de São Cosme e São Damião
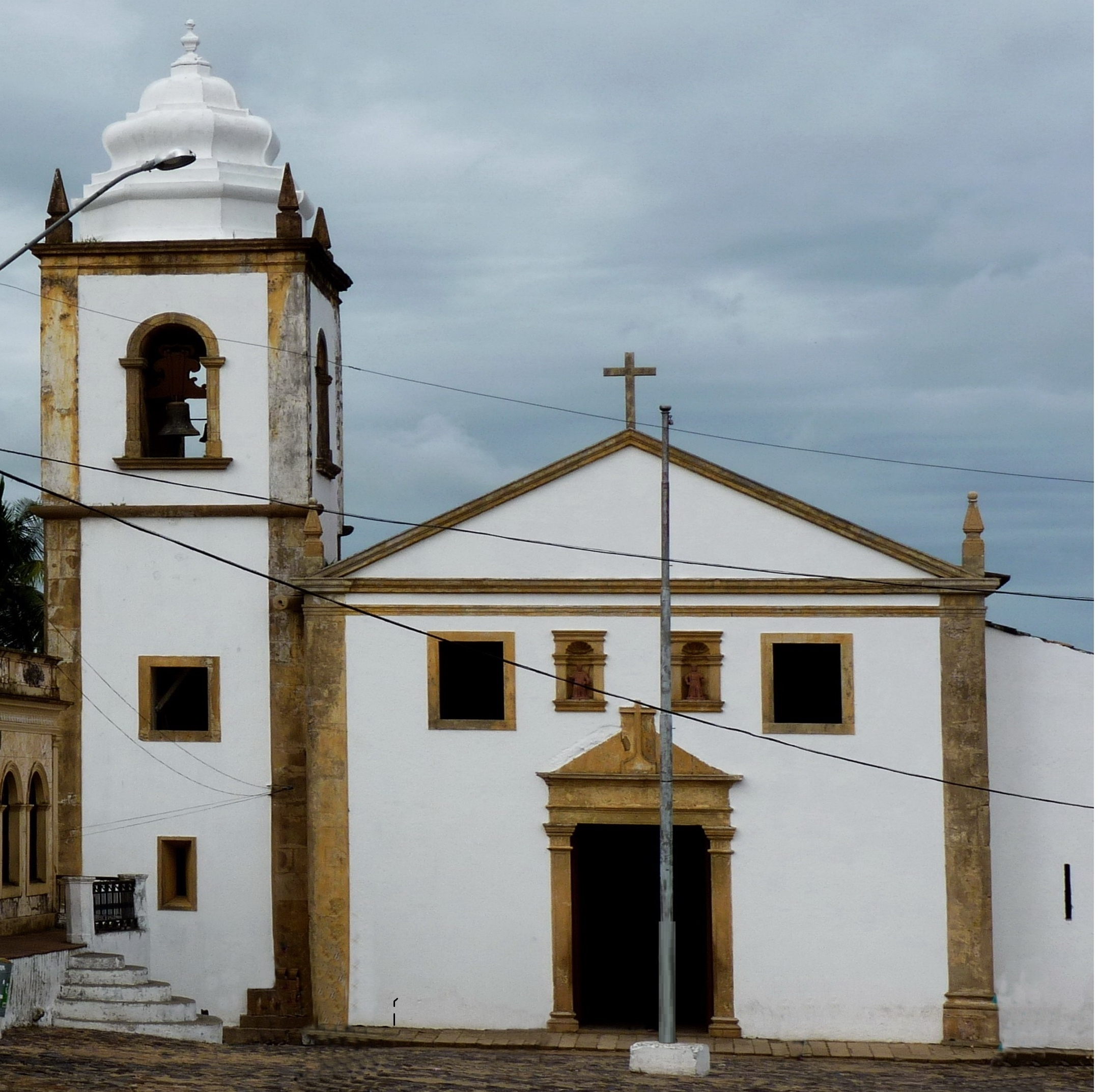

- Location of the Church of Saints Cosme and Damião in Brazil

Religion
- Affiliation: Catholic
- Rite: Roman Rite
- Ownership: Roman Catholic Archdiocese of Olinda e Recife
- Patron: Saints Cosmas and Damian
- Year consecrated: 1535
- Status: Active

Location
- Municipality: Igarassu
- State: Pernambuco
- Country: Brazil
- Interactive map of Church of Saints Cosme and Damião
- Coordinates: 7.8340745°S 34.9063078°W

Architecture
- Style: Baroque, Mannerist

National Historic Heritage of Brazil
- Designated: 1945
- Reference no.: 359

The Church of Saints Cosme and Damião (Portuguese: Igreja dos Santos Cosme e Damião), officially called the Igreja Matriz de São Cosme e São Damião, is a Catholic church located in the city of Igarassu, Pernambuco, Brazil. The church dates to 1535, early in the settlement of Pernambuco, and survived the Dutch invasion of the 17th century. It is the oldest functioning church in Brazil, according to the Brazilian National Institute of Historic and Artistic Heritage. The church is dedicated to Saints Cosmas and Damian and belongs to the Roman Catholic Archdiocese of Olinda and Recife. It sits adjacent to the Church and Convent of Saint Antony, now a sacred art museum. The church was listed as a historic structure by the National Historic and Artistic Heritage Institute in 1945.

== History ==
Construction of the Church of Saints Cosme and Damião began in 1535, when Duarte Coelho, grantee of the Captaincy of Pernambuco, landed in Igarassu to take control of the territory, donated to him by the Portuguese crown. It survived the Dutch invasions in Brazil in the following century. The structure is prominently featured in a painting by the Dutch artist Frans Post.

A miracle that supposedly happened in Igarassu in 1685 is attributed to the saints Cosme e Damião, an outbreak of yellow fever occurred in the cities of Recife, Olinda, Itamaracá and Goiana, but it did not spread to Igarassu.

The 16th-century chapel was in ruin by 1755. The church was rebuilt by increasing its volume, but retaining its simple façade, triangular pediment, and a single portal. Paintings depicting the Dutch invasion and daily life in Igarassu were installed in the 18th century. Baroque features of the church were removed in 1950 to restore the church to the Mannerist style, notably its simple triangular pediment. The niches above the central portal were also recovered.

The Church of Saints Cosme and Damião suffered vandalism and theft in 2014. Thieves cut the electricity to the church on March 4, 2014 and entered via a hole cut from the rear wall of the church into its central altar. Cupboards and drawers in the church were destroyed. Two silver objects were stolen from the church: a naveta, a type of incense burner, and a spoon used for Communion. The items were not recovered.

An extensive restoration of the parish church was completed in 2022. The high altar and exterior walls, previously damaged, were repaired. Numerous images and artwork were restored at the nearby Sacred Art Museum.

== Structure ==
The Church of Saints Cosme and Damião consists of a simple façade with a triangular pediment and single central portal; it has elements of Renaissance architecture, likely due to its design in the 16th century. The structure retains the design of the chapel depicted in Frans Post's painting of the 17th century, but was enlarged in 1755. The portal is framed in carved stone; there are two square windows at the choir level with two niches between. The church is flanked on the left by a single bell tower topped by a bulbous pyramid; it dates to the 18th century.

The interior has a nave, chancel, a single sacristy, a vestry, a choir, side corridors and tribunes. is simple. The walls of the nave are whitewashed, with two pulpits with wood balconies. The chancel is separated from the nave by a richly carved chancel arch in stone. The altarpiece is in the rococo and neoclassical style and is gilded. The sacristy has paintings that date to 1729; they depict life in the city of Igarassu, episodes of the Dutch War, and allusions to the first Portuguese settlers in the region.

The sacristy fountain is of richly carved stone with floral and fish motifs. The sacristy has a collection of sacred images. The most important are images of Saints Cosme, holding a pot, and Saint Damien, holding a parchment. They date to the 16th century, and were located in the niches of the façade. They were removed from the façade in the 1950s. It additionally has an image of Saint Anne.

== Protected status ==
The Church of Saints Cosme and Damião was listed as a historic structure by the National Institute of Historic and Artistic Heritage in 1951. It is listed in the Book of Historical Works process no. 359. The church is located within the Historic Center of Igarassu, which became a protected urban center by IPHAN in 1972.

== Festival of Saints Cosme and Damião ==
The Festival of Saints Cosme and Damião is held annually in September. It is both one of the oldest and most important religious festivals in Pernambuco.

== Access ==
Mass is held weekly at the church and it may be visited.

== See also ==
- Church and Convent of Saint Antony
- Chapel of Our Lady of Deliverance
