= Budoželja =

- Village
- Location within Serbia
- Coordinates: 43°32′00″N 20°17′24″E
- Country: Serbia
- District: Moravica District
- Municipality: Ivanjica

Area
  - Total: 19.08 km^{2} (7.37 sq mi)

Population (2011)
  - Total: 214
  - Density: 11.2/km^{2} (29.0/sq mi)
- Time zone: UTC+1 (CET)
  - Summer (DST): UTC+2 (CEST)

Budoželja (Serbian Cyrillic: Будожеља) is a village in the municipality of Ivanjica, Serbia. According to the 2011 census, the village has a population of 214 inhabitants.
