= Igarassu, Pernambuco =

Municipality in Northeastern Brazil

Igarassu Município de Igarassu
- Municipality
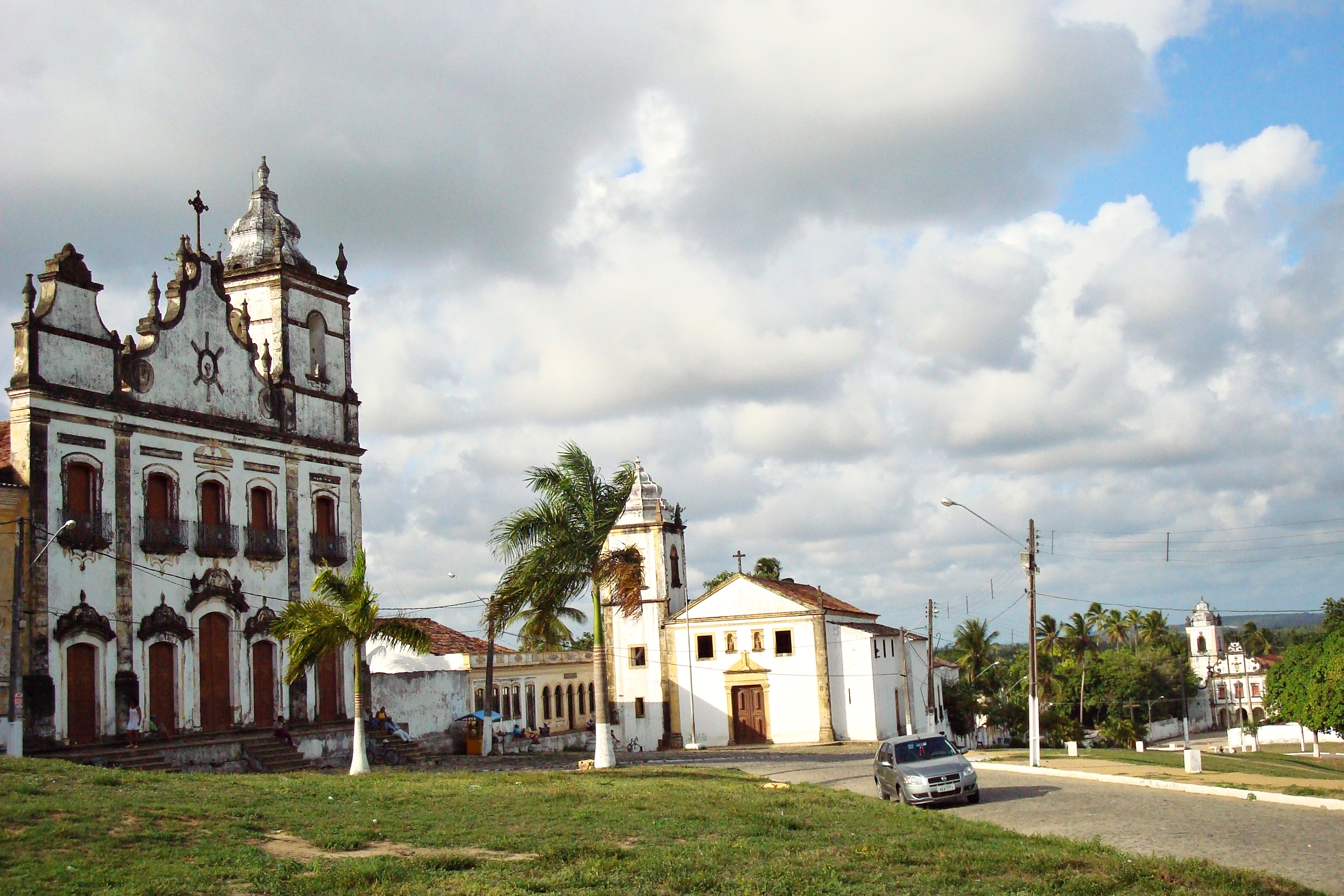
- Historic center of Igarassu

- Flag Coat of arms

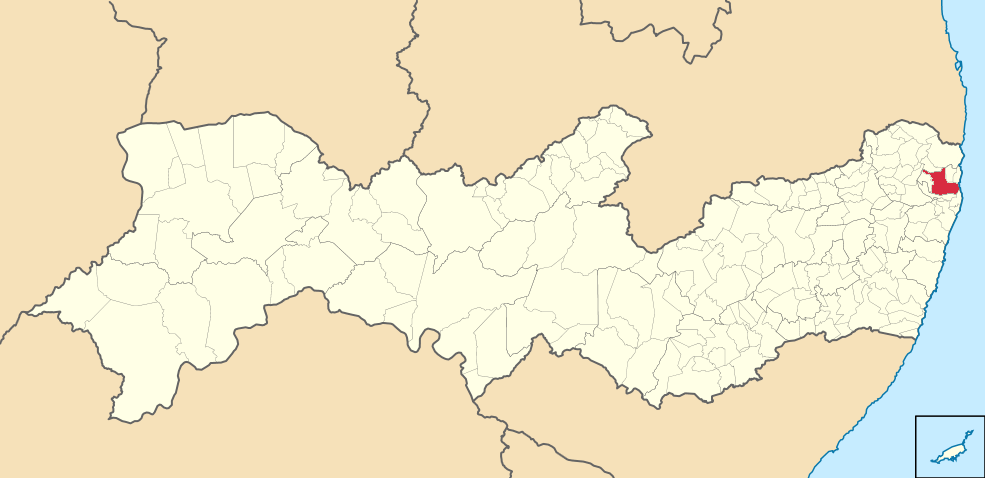
- Location of Igarassu in Pernambuco

- Location of Igarassu in Brazil
- Coordinates: 7°50′03″S 34°54′23″W
- Country: Brazil
- Region: Northeast
- State: Pernambuco
- Founded: 1535

Government
  - Mayor: Mario Ricardo (2016–2020)

Area
  - Total: 305.56 km^{2} (117.98 sq mi)
- Elevation: 19 m (62 ft)

Population (2022 Census)
  - Total: 115,196
  - Estimate (2025): 123,017
  - Density: 377.00/km^{2} (976.42/sq mi)
- Demonym: Igarassuense
- Time zone: UTC−3 (BRT)
- Website: igarassu.pe.gov.br

Igarassu (Central northeastern portuguese pronunciation: [iɡɐɾɐˈsu]) (or Igaraçu^{A}) is a city in the Brazilian state of Pernambuco. It is the second-oldest city of the country and is situated on the north coast of the metropolitan region of Recife, approximately 32 kilometres (20 mi). It stands as one of the earliest European settlements in Brazil and is the site of the oldest church in the country, the Church of Saints Cosme and Damião, built in 1535. Igarassu is home to numerous colonial-period historic structures. The historic center of the city was designated a national monument by the National Institute of Historic and Artistic Heritage (IPHAN) in 1972.

== History ==
Igarassu was inhabited by Caetés Indians before the arrival of Europeans in the 16th century. Its genesis as a town came with the arrival in the area of Duarte Coelho Pereira in 1535. Coelho's arrival marked the beginning of the Portuguese settlement of Brazil.

The town itself was established in 1537 as the village of Igarassu, which means “Great Canoe” in Tupi-Guaraní. It was one of the first European settlements of the Hereditary Captaincy (a Portuguese administrative division) of Pernambuco. Shortly after Coelho's arrival he ordered a rock landmark erected to mark the border between Pernambuco and Itamaracá; this still stands today. Igarassu was destroyed at the end of the Dutch occupation of Brazil in the mid-17th century. Architectural materials from the ruins of Igarassu were used to build the town of Olinda.

Igarassu grew from the 16th century as a result of the sugar cane trade; the town served as a point of transport between the sugar mills on the interior of Pernambuco and the Atlantic Ocean ports.

Igarassu was the site of the brief liberal republican Praieira revolt in 1848, in which the troops of Colonel Manuel Pereira de Morais were installed in the Convent of Saint Antônio. Today the Pinacoteca Museum stands in its place. One of the military officers who put down the revolt was Deodoro da Fonseca, later briefly the first president of the Brazilian republic.

== Geography ==
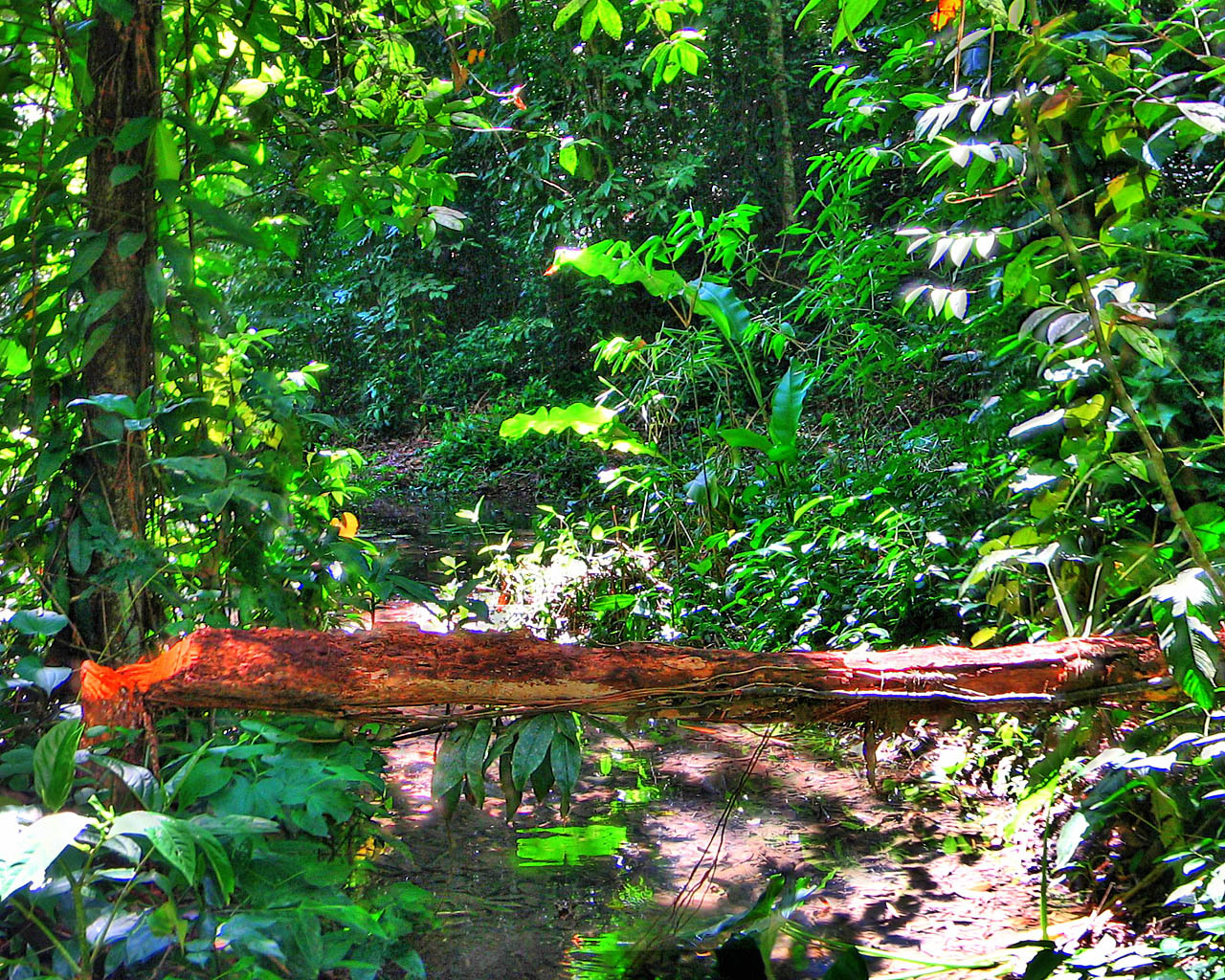
Atlantic Forest

- Boundaries – Goiana and Itaquitinga (N); Paulista and Abreu e Lima (S); Tracunhaém and Araçoiaba (W); Itamaraca, Itapissuma and the Atlantic Ocean (E)
- Hydrography – Goiana and Igarassu Rivers
- Vegetation – Mata atlântica, Capoeirinha, coconut trees, sugarcane plantation and Mangal
- Clima – Hot tropical and humid
- Annual average temperature – 25.2 °C
- Main roads – BR-101 and PE-035
- Distance to Recife – 32.3 kilometres (20.1 mi)

== Beaches ==
Gavôa beach

Suitable for water sports, has no deep water and is located 13 kilometres (8.1 mi) east of the city center.

Coroa do Avião Islet beach

A sandbar islet in the middle of the Jaguaribe River delta, which can only be reached by boat or raft from Itamaracá or Gavoa beach. Its name means "Airplane crown". The islet has many luxurious summer houses.

Mangue Seco beach

Also known as "Captain's beach", Mangue Seco is about 1,500m long, and at low tide the waves retreat some 500m. Its name means "dry mangal".

== Economy ==
The main economic activities in Igarassu are based in general industry, commerce and primary sector activities( sugar cane plantation and cattle). Tourism is also an important role due to its historical town center, beaches and the proximity with Itamaraca and Paulista beaches.

=== Economic Indicators ===
Population	GDP x(1000 R$).	GDP pc (R$)	PE (%)	RMR (%)
100.191	734.430	7.834	1.17	1.85

Economy by Sector 2006

Primary sector	Secondary sector	Service sector
3.64%	46.88%	49.48%

=== Health Indicators ===
HDI (2000)	Hospitals (2007)	Hospitals beds (2007)	Children's Mortality per 1,000 (2005)
0.719	2	158	13.3

== Historic structures ==
The historic center of Cachoeira was designated a national monument by the National Institute of Historic and Artistic Heritage (IPHAN) in 1972. Five religious structures are also designated as national monuments of Brazil.

- Church of Saints Cosme and Damião (Igreja Matriz de São Cosme e São Damião), 1535
- Church and Convent of Saint Antony (Convento e Igreja de Santo Antônio), 1558
- Chapel of Saint Sebastian (Capela de São Sebastião), 1735
- Retreat of the Sacred Heart of Jesus and Church of Our Lady of the Conception (Igreja do Sagrado Coração de Jesus), 1742
- Chapel of Our Lady of Deliverance (Capela de Nossa Senhora do Livramento), 1774

== Notable people ==
- Philco (Halesson Tiago Barbosa Honorato), professional footballer

== See also ==
- List of municipalities in Pernambuco

== Footnotes ==
A.The name of the municipality was written Igaraçu; it was changed to Igarassu in accordance with Brazilian reforms of the orthography of the Portuguese language.

== See also ==
- Igarassu City Hall
- Igarassu info in English
- Aerial view of Igarassu beaches
- City view
