= Santi Cosma e Damiano, Brescia =

Coordinates: 45.5394°N 10.2121°E

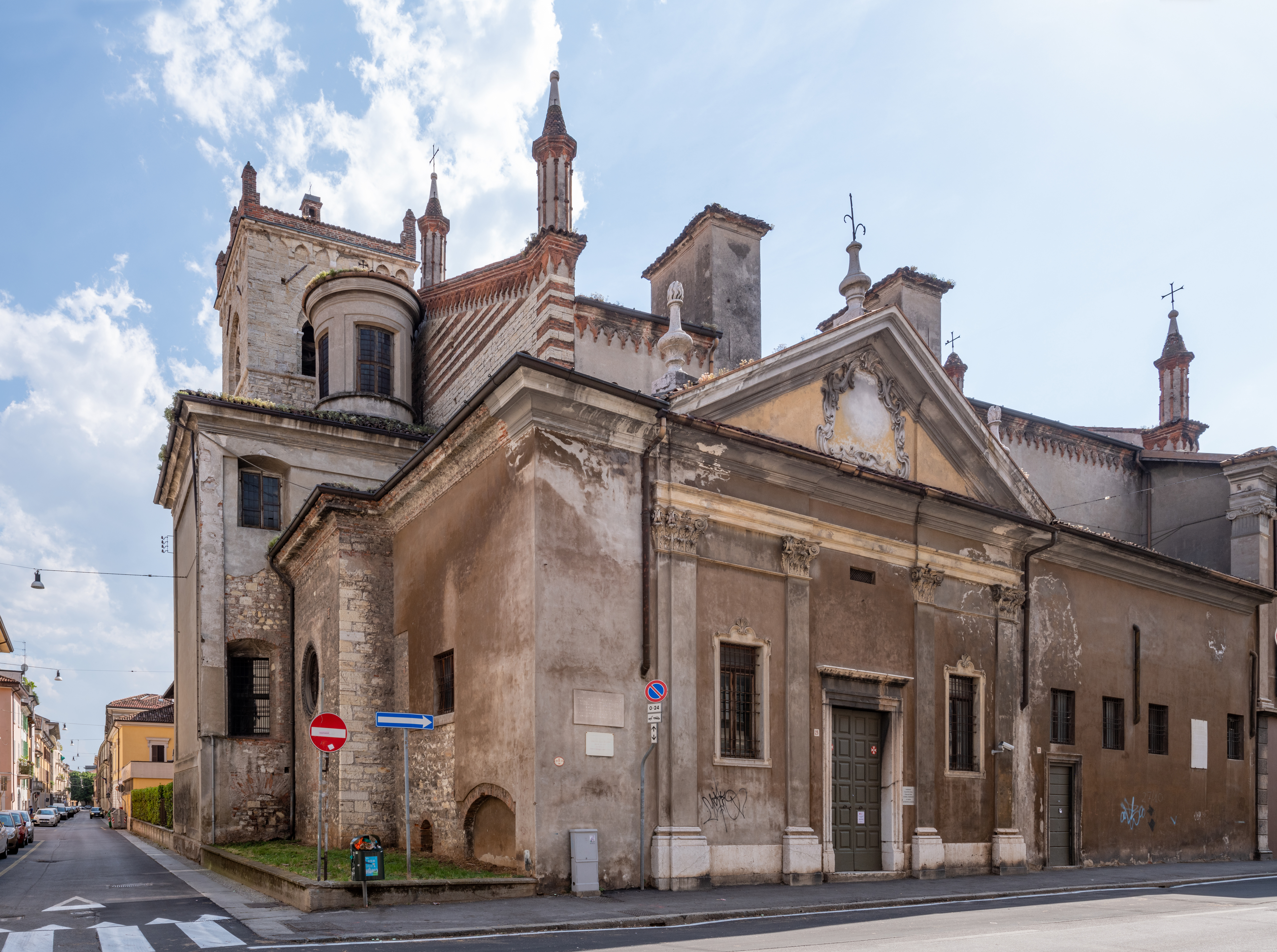
Facade of the church of Santi Cosma e Damiano in Brescia

Santi Cosma e Damiano is a church in central Brescia, a region of Lombardy, Italy.

== History ==
Of the 12th-century Romanesque construction, only the bell-tower remains; the present facade and interiors mainly date to a reconstruction in the 18th century. The main altar (18th century) in polychrome marble has statues by Antonio Callegari and altarpiece by Giambettino Cignaroli and a 16th-century Ark of San Tiziano. Adjacent to the church is a 15th-century cloister. In 1923, at the instigation of a local poet Angelo Canossi, the names of the Italians who died in the war were inscribed in the columns.
