= Church of Cosmas and Damian, Novgorod =

Church building in Novgorod Oblast, Russia

The Church of St. Cosmas and Damian on Kholop Street (Russian: Церковь святых Кузьмы и Демьяна на Холопьей улице) was a church in medieval Novgorod the Great located in the Nerev End, just north of the Detinets. It was a wooden church first built by Fedor Khotovich in 1271. It was rebuilt in 1303, probably after a fire in the Nerev End. and about a generation later was the parish church of Archbishop Vasilii Kalika prior to his election as archbishop of Novgorod in 1330 (he was known as Grigorii Kalika before taking monastic vows). Vasilii's parish church in Kholop Street was rebuilt in 1350 by the Posadnik (mayor) Iurii Ivanovich That church apparently burned in 1352, the year Archbishop Vasilii died of the plague. It is unclear if a new church was ever built on the site; there is no longer a church at that location, which is now a park north of the Novgorod Kremlin.
