= Ar-Rudaymah ash-Sharqiyah =

Ar-Rudaymah ash-Sharqiyah الرضيمة الشرقيّة Ar-Rudaymah
- Village
- Location within Syria
- Coordinates: 32°53′48″N 36°46′13″E
- Country: Syria
- Governorate: Suwayda
- District: Shahba
- Subdistrict: Shaqqa

Population (2004 census)
  - Total: 1,290
- Time zone: UTC+2 (EET)
  - Summer (DST): UTC+3 (EEST)

Ar-Rudaymah ash-Sharqiyah (Arabic: الرضيمة الشرقيّة) is a village situated in the Shahba District of Suwayda Governorate, in southern Syria. According to the Syria Central Bureau of Statistics (CBS), Ar-Rudaymah ash-Sharqiyah had a population of 1,290 in the 2004 census. Its inhabitants are predominantly Druze, with a Christian minority.

== Demographics ==
In 2011, the Melkite Greek Catholic Church had approximately 300 believers.

== Religious buildings ==
- Saints Cosmas and Damian Melkite Greek Catholic Church
- Maqam Shuaib (Druze Shrine)

== See also ==
- Druze in Syria
- Christians in Syria
