= Mining in Paraná =

State in Southern Brazil

The flag of Paraná

Mining in Paraná is a set of studies, research, knowledge, and theories regarding the mineralogical aspects of the state of Paraná, in Brazil. Paraná is the second federative unit of Brazil that produces the most talc, which is extracted in the municipality of Ponta Grossa. In 2016, it was responsible for 40% of the country's production, ahead of Bahia and São Paulo. It is the sixth state that produces the most silver, behind Mato Grosso. Coal, dolomite (used to produce metallic magnesium and refractory marble), limestone ( used in the steel and metallurgical industries, and to produce cement and paints) are also found in Paraná. Shale (schist) is also extracted, which, when heated, provides natural gas, sulfur, and other fuels. Petrobrás developed a shale industrialization program, which includes a plant in São Mateus do Sul, in the south of the state.

== Mining regions ==
The Crystalline Plateau of Paraná (also known as the First Plateau of Paraná), the Serra do Mar, and certain coastal regions form the most important metal deposits in Paraná. In the northern part of the Plateau, geological events occurred that made certain important metals appear as well as the rocks of the "Açungui Group" (that consists of the Capiru, Votuverava e Antinha formations). This assemblage, formed in the most distant Precambrian epochs is similar to the "Minas Group," which is considered to be the most enriched of minerals in Brazil.

A second region of importance in mineral resources is the Paleozoic Plateau of Paraná. The Paleozoic sedimentation that took place in this region formed the coal-bearing sediments and the shales.

After a mixed-capital company (owned both by private individuals and the government), called Minerais do Paraná S.A. (MINEROPAR) was founded, research into minerals in the state increased. With this, these studies were used more rationally, in addition to the discovery of new regions that produce ores.

== Fuels ==
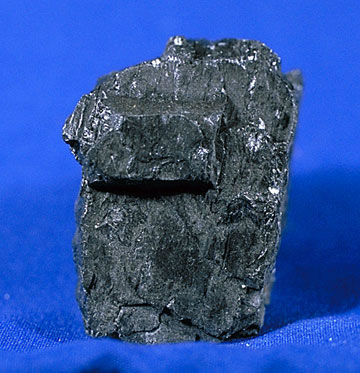
Coal

Despite its small use in steel industries, due to the difficulty of its processing because of the high quantities of sulfur, ashes, and humidity, coal from Paraná is widely used for thermoelectric energy. Examples are the plants of the Figueira Thermal Power Station and the Klabin Industries in Telêmaco Borba. Paraná reserves of this fuel are estimated at 1.3%, behind Santa Catarina and Rio Grande do Sul (according to information from the National Department of Mineral Production), and Paraná is the third federal unit in Brazil that produces the most coal.

In Paraná, coal is geographically distributed throughout the municipalities of Curiúva, Figueira, Sapopema, Tomazina, Telêmaco Borba, Tibagi, Reserva, Prudentópolis, Imbituva, Irati, Teixeira Soares, Palmeira, São João do Triunfo, and Antônio Olinto. It is mostly produced by the municipalities whose deposits are located along the basins of the Peixe and das Cinzas rivers, in the region known as Norte Pioneiro ("Pioneer North").

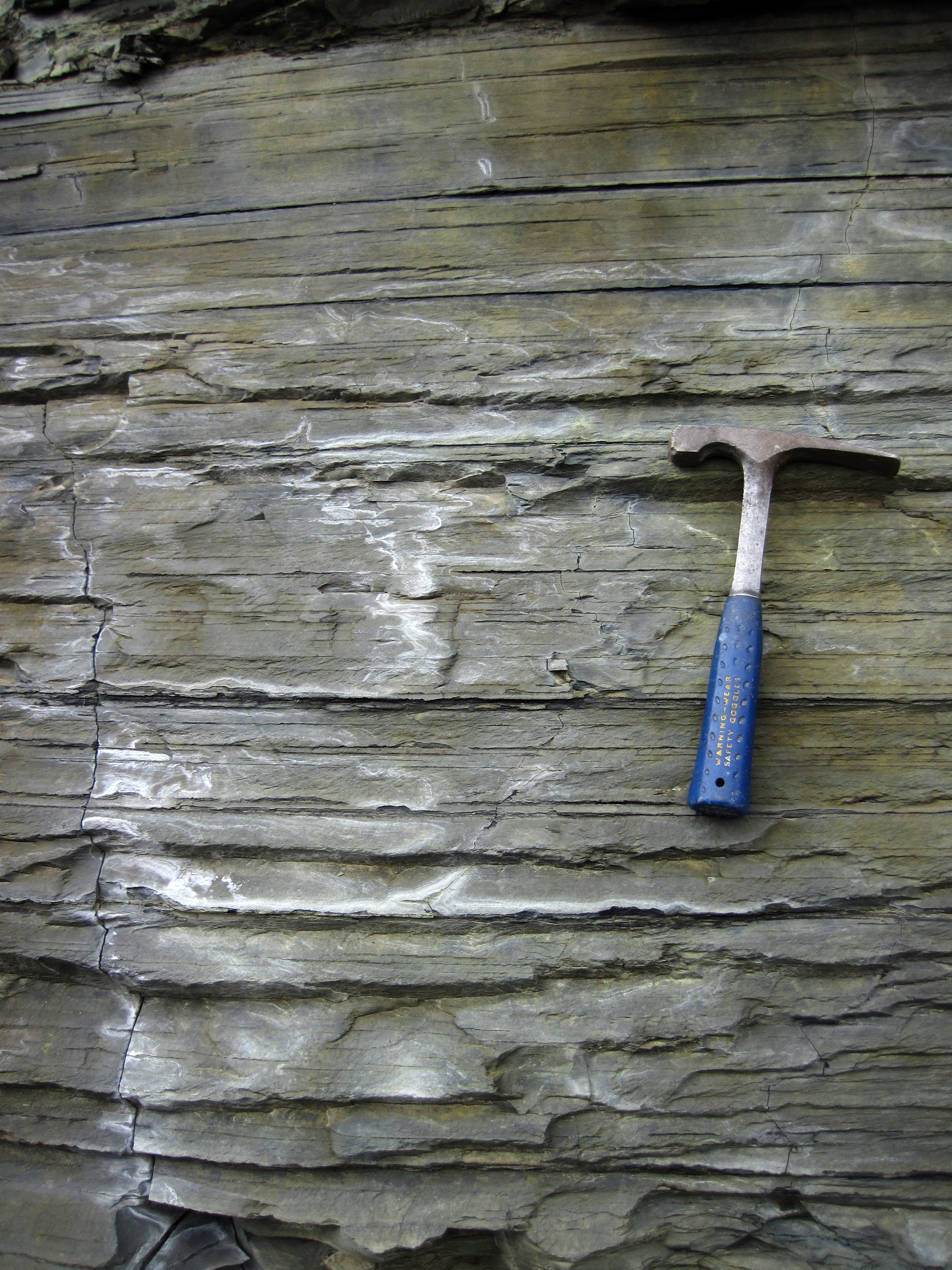
Shale

The largest Brazilian deposits of shale are part of the extensive "Irati formation" between southern São Paulo and Rio Grande do Sul. Paraná has the most favorable conditions for extracting shale, whether because of the greater amount of oil or because of the easier open-air extraction. For these reasons, Petrobrás installed a plant that aims to extract the enormous gas, sulfur, and oil deposits in the area. The Petrosix process, elaborated with Brazil's technology and Petrobrás' patent, obtains the oil and sulfur from the shale.

The Paraná belt of shale is between 4 and 25 km long and has an extension of 420 km, and in certain places is 100 m deep. Research by Petrobrás on a surface of 82 km has proven that there are 650 million barrels of oil, the production capacity being 100,000 barrels per day in the span of 25 years.

The most important and extensive shale deposits in Paraná are in the municipalities of São Mateus do Sul, São João do Triunfo, Rebouças, Irati, Imbituva, Ipiranga, Tibagi, Ivaí, Ortigueira, Curiúva, Sapopema, Ibaiti, Conselheiro Mairinck, Guapirama, Joaquim Távora, Carlópolis, and Siqueira Campos.

Peat sediments come from plant waste that accumulates in bogs. Used as a natural fertilizer and as an energy source, peat likely forms the oldest structuring of coal deposits. Paraná has peatlands of importance, such as those found in the municipalities of the Curitiba Metropolitan Region and the Paraná Coast.

== Metallic minerals ==
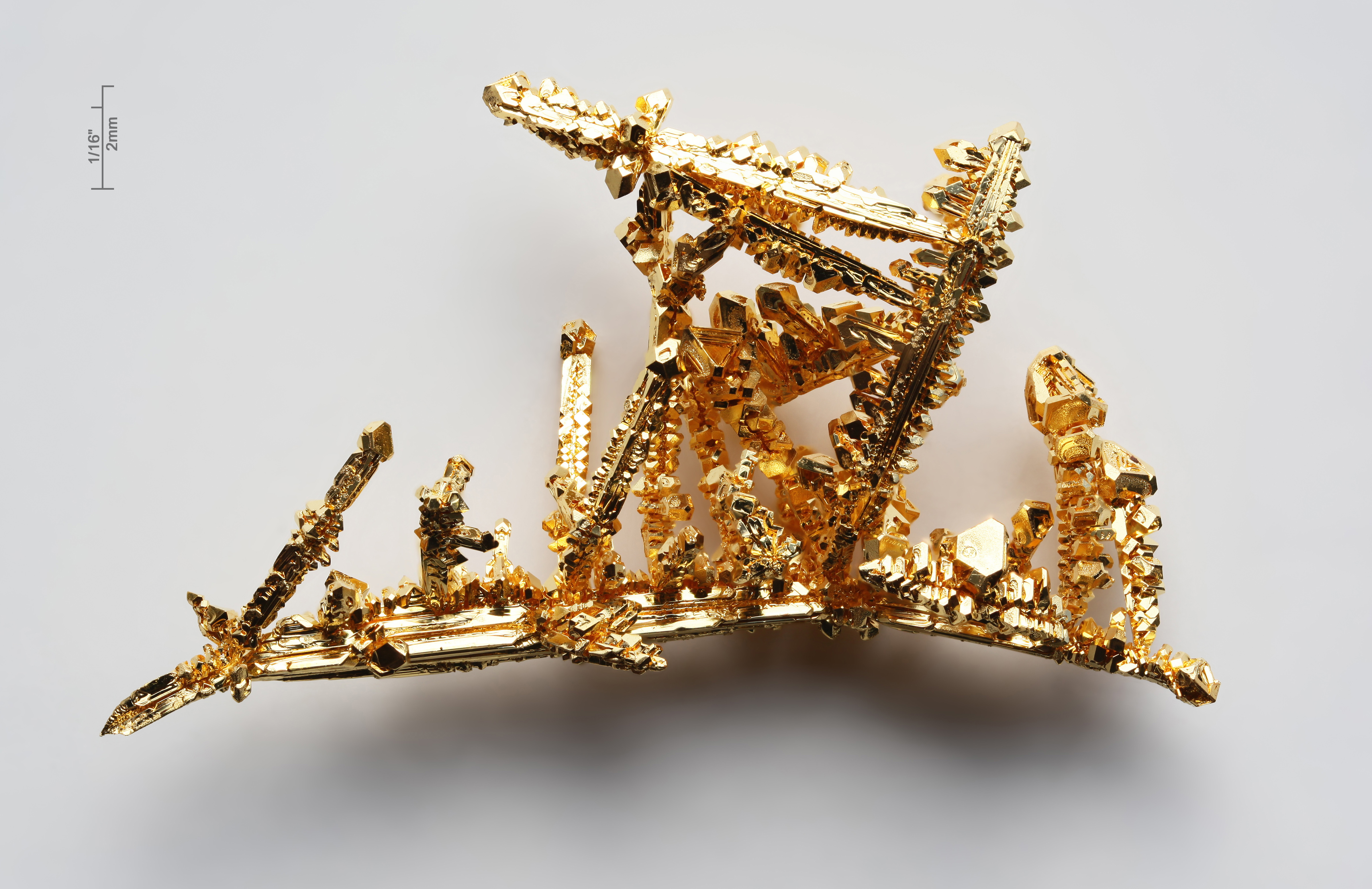
Artificial gold crystals.

The most important type of lead found in Paraná is argentiferous galena. The largest deposits are located in the municipalities of Adrianópolis, Cerro Azul and Bocaiúva do Sul. The treatment of the galena, in order to extract the lead, is done by Plumbum S.A., a company located on the bank of the Ribeira River in Adrianópolis.

Paraná also has relevant iron reserves, which are concentrated in a large number of municipalities in the eastern and northern-eastern portions of the state. The most extensive hematite deposits are found in the municipalities of Antonina, Colombo, Almirante Tamandaré, Cerro Azul, Bocaiúva do Sul, Rio Branco do Sul, Castro, and São José dos Pinhais. Other minerals such as limonite and magnetite, although in fewer quantities, are also found in the same region.

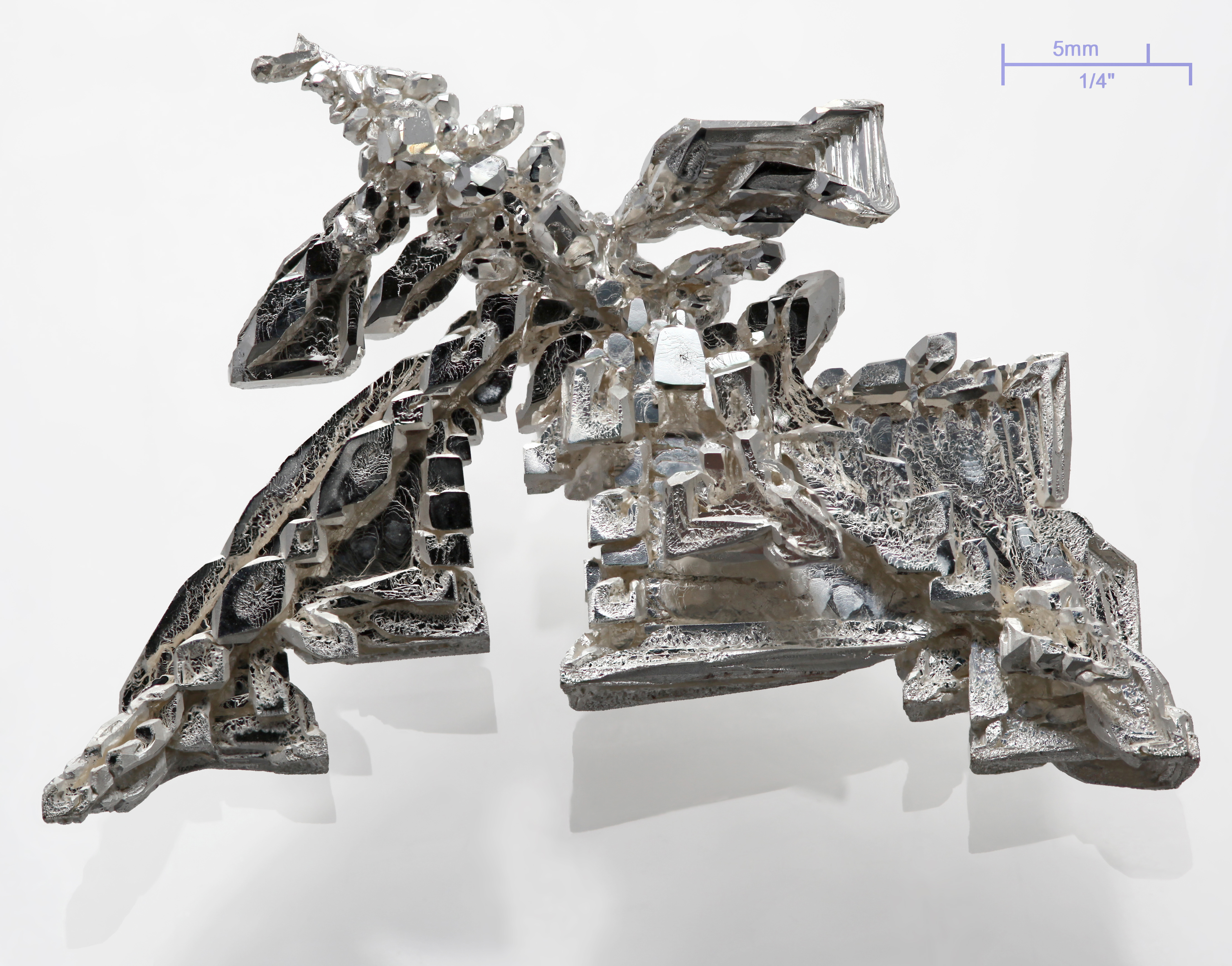
An artificial crystal of pure silver.

During World War II, copper was extracted in small quantities in Paraná, in the Serra do Cadeado region. Copper deposits occur around Cerro Azul, Bocaiúva do Sul, and Adrianópolis. Newer research has revealed remains of the ore in Maringá, Guarapuava, and much of southwestern Paraná.

The vast majority of gold and silver is mined from galena, as byproducts. Paraná produces a significant amount of silver, which is mined in Adrianópolis. Cities with gold deposits are: Campo Largo, Bocaiúva do Sul, Morretes, Cerro Azul, and Adrianópolis. Studies, carried out in the central-eastern portion of Paraná have shown that there are other metal ores present in the state such as zirconium and niobium.

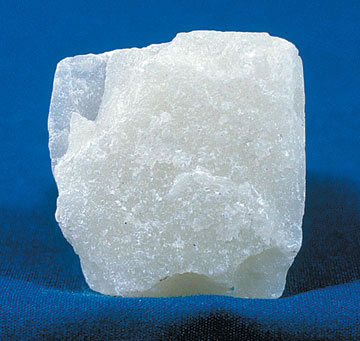
Talc block

== Non-metallic minerals ==
With 13.2% of the national production, limestones form the largest Paraná deposits of manufacturing stone (limestone is widely applied in the making of cement, lime, correctives for soil acidity, fluxes for steelmaking, chemicals, and construction materials). It is common in the Crystalline Plateau of Paraná, where the municipalities of Campo Largo, Almirante Tamandaré, Colombo, Rio Branco do Sul, Curitiba, Cerro Azul, and Adrianópolis have considerable deposits.

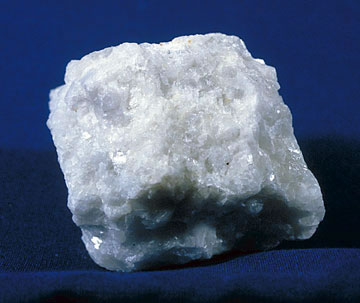
Marble block

The talc deposits, containing 40% of the Brazilian production, cover an area that extends through the municipalities of Ponta Grossa (Itaiacoca), Castro (Abapã and Socavão), Jaguariaíva, Sengés, Cerro Azul, and Bocaiúva do Sul. Paraná has one of the purest talcs on the planet which is used in perfumery, chemical products, pharmaceuticals, ceramics, textile factories, and the paper industry.

Marble is an ornamental stone, resulting from the transformation of limestone, existing in a range of colors. The white marble called "Paraná type", stands out for being resistant, and for this reason, it is widely used in construction, sculptures, tombs, and monuments. Paraná produces a considerable amount of marble in Brazil, with the cities of Cerro Azul, Rio Branco do Sul, and Bocaiúva do Sul being worthy of mention.

Sand is the main raw material for construction. It is often extracted in the regions near the most populated cities. Clay is the raw material for the manufacturing of red ceramics (bricks, tiles, and vases). It is often present in the alluvial regions of river valleys, such as in the municipalities of Curitiba, Campo Largo, São José dos Pinhais, Mandirituba, Araucária, and Balsa Nova.

Kaolinite is a type of clay used to industrialize white ceramic products (chinaware, tiles, and flooring). The urban area of Campo Largo, due to its numerous factories, is called the "Capital of Ceramics". Kaolinite is also useful in the paper, rubber, and insecticide factories. The most important deposits are located in the municipalities of Campo Largo, Palmeira, Contenda, Rio Branco do Sul, Bocaiúva do Sul, and Cerro Azul.

Baryte is the most important barium mineral. It is used in the production of television sets, plastics, rubbers, and to prepare coarse clays for oil drilling. Fluorite is applied in the chemical industry, as a metallurgical flux and in ceramics. This mineral is concentrated in the lower Ribeira river basin, especially in the municipality of Cerro Azul. Paraná's deposits are the largest in Brazil.

Ilmenite can be found on the coastal islands (Superagui, das Peças, and do Mel), as well as on the shores of the Paranaguá and Guaratuba bays. It is used to produce dyes for the manufacturing of paints, paper, and plastics.

Other non-metallic mineral resources are: dolomite, quartzite, sandstone, gneiss, granite, and basalt. They are used to cover walls, on sidewalks, in monuments, sculptures, and tombs.

== Hydrominerals, atomic minerals, precious and semi-precious stones ==
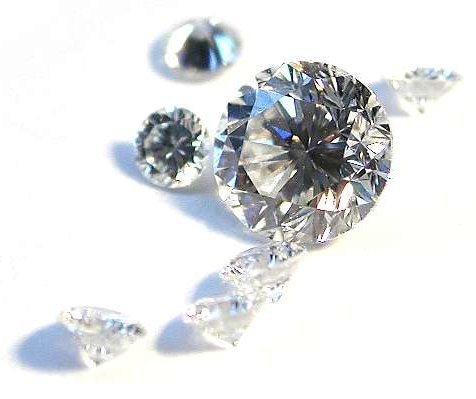
Cut diamond crystals.

There are, in Paraná, mineral and thermal water springs originating from alkaline elements, magnesium, and sulphuric acid. Some cities exploit these springs for therapy purposes, as in Mallet, Candói, Iretama, Cornélio Procópio, Bandeirantes, Verê, Coronel Vivida, and Maringá. Other springs have their waters manufactured to be consumed by the population, as in Campo Largo, Almirante Tamandaré, Londrina, and Tibagi.

Uranium deposits in Paraná are found in an area that goes from Teixeira Soares to Figueira. Diamonds and agates are occasionally found in the river Tibaji and its tributaries, in the rivers Das Cinzas and do Peixe (Norte Pioneiro). Opals, malachites, and azurites (semi-precious) are found in Cerro Azul. Amethysts are present in the municipality of Guarapuava, in the western and southwestern portions of Paraná.

== See also ==
- Mining in Brazil
- Coal mining in Brazil

== Bibliography ==
- Wons, Iaroslaw (1994). Geografia do Paraná (in Brazilian Portuguese) (6th ed.). Curitiba: Ensino Renovado.
