= Japira =

- Municipality
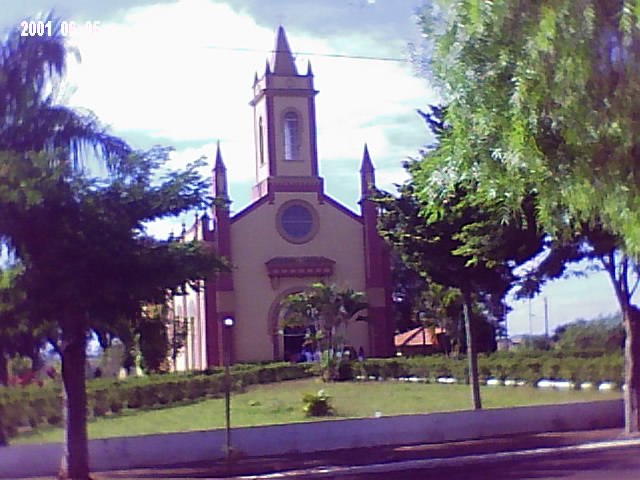

- Flag Coat of arms

- Location in Paraná state

- Location in Brazil
- Coordinates: 23°48′46″S 50°8′20″W
- Country: Brazil
- Region: South
- State: Paraná
- Mesoregion: Ibaiti
- Neighboring municipalities: Pinhalão, Jaboti, Conselheiro Mairinck, Ibaiti, Jundiaí do Sul
- Distance to Capital: 199km

Government
  - Mayor: Hariel Vieira Fogaça (MDB)

Area
  - Total: 189,139 km^{2} (73,027 sq mi)
- Elevation: 660 m (2,170 ft)

Population (2020)
  - Total: 4,930
  - Density: 0.0261/km^{2} (0.0675/sq mi)
- Demonym: japirense
- Time zone: UTC−3 (BRT)

Japira is a municipality in the state of Paraná in the southern Region of Brazil.

== History ==
Japira was an integral part of the municipality of Tomazina, In 1923, Colonel Joaquim Pedro de Oliveira owned an area between the rivers Laranjinha and das Cinzas. In the following year, the colonel donates a certain tract of his land, thus a railroad ran through his estate that rans south. The railway station for Japira was completed by 1924, and it inaugurated its first railway station on April 1, 1925.

Dozens of houses were being built around it within years, then under Law No. 93 on September 19, 1948, Japira became an administrative or judicial district under jurisdiction of Tomazina.

=== As a municipality ===
Japira became a municipality under Law No. 790 on November 14, 1951, with its first elections came within a year later. Colonel Joaquim Pedro de Oliveira was elected mayor. In 1954, under law, Japira lost a portion of its territory that became the new municipality of Jaboti.

== Geography ==
It has an area of 189km^{2}, representing 0.0949% of Paraná. It is located at a latitude of 23°48'46" south, and a longitude of 50°08'20" west, at an attitude of 660 meters. The Pico Agudo mountain is located near Japira.

== Economy ==
Japira has one of the largest sawmills in the region, it is also home to cotton and coffee processing machines.

== See also ==
- List of municipalities in Paraná
