= Jaboti =

Coordinates: 23.7428°S 50.0758°W

- Municipality
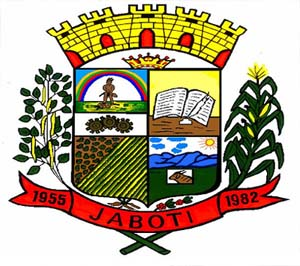
- Coat of arms
- Interactive map of Jaboti
- Country: Brazil
- Region: Southern
- State: Paraná
- Mesoregion: Norte Pioneiro Paranaense
- Neighboring municipalities: Pinhalão, Tomazina, Conselheiro Mairinck, Japira
- Distance to Capital: 332km

Government
  - Mayor: Regis William Siqueira Rodrigues (2021 - 2024) (PSD)
  - Deputy Mayor: Professora Lucia Helena

Area
  - Total: 53,750 sq mi (139,210 km^{2})
- Elevation: 1,840 ft (560 m)

Population (2020)
  - Total: 5,303
- Demonym: jabotiense
- Time zone: UTC−3 (BRT)
- Climate: Cfa
- Website: jaboti.pr.gov.br

Jaboti is a municipality in the state of Paraná in the Southern Region of Brazil. It is located in the microregion of Ibaiti.

== History ==
Jaboti was founded in the late 19th century by Antônio José de Azevedo and João de Paula. Its current territory was part of Fazenda Jaboticabal, from which it got its name for the locality. It was then renamed Jaboti because there was a city with the same name as the original.

Jaboti was elevated to the category of district by Decree No. 561 on December 1, 1909, and then as a Judicial District of the neighboring municipality of Tomazina by State Law No. 1110 on March 19, 1912. It became a municipality by State Law No. 2645 on April 10, 1929. It remained so until it was extinguished by virtue of Decree No. 106 on January 22, 1934. All of Jaboti's territories were transferred back to Tomazina.

It then became part of the territory of the new municipality of Japira in 1951, until it was returned as a municipality in 1954.

== See also ==
- List of municipalities in Paraná
