= Campinhos State Park =

State park in Paraná, Brazil

- Parque Estadual de Campinhos
- IUCN category II (national park)
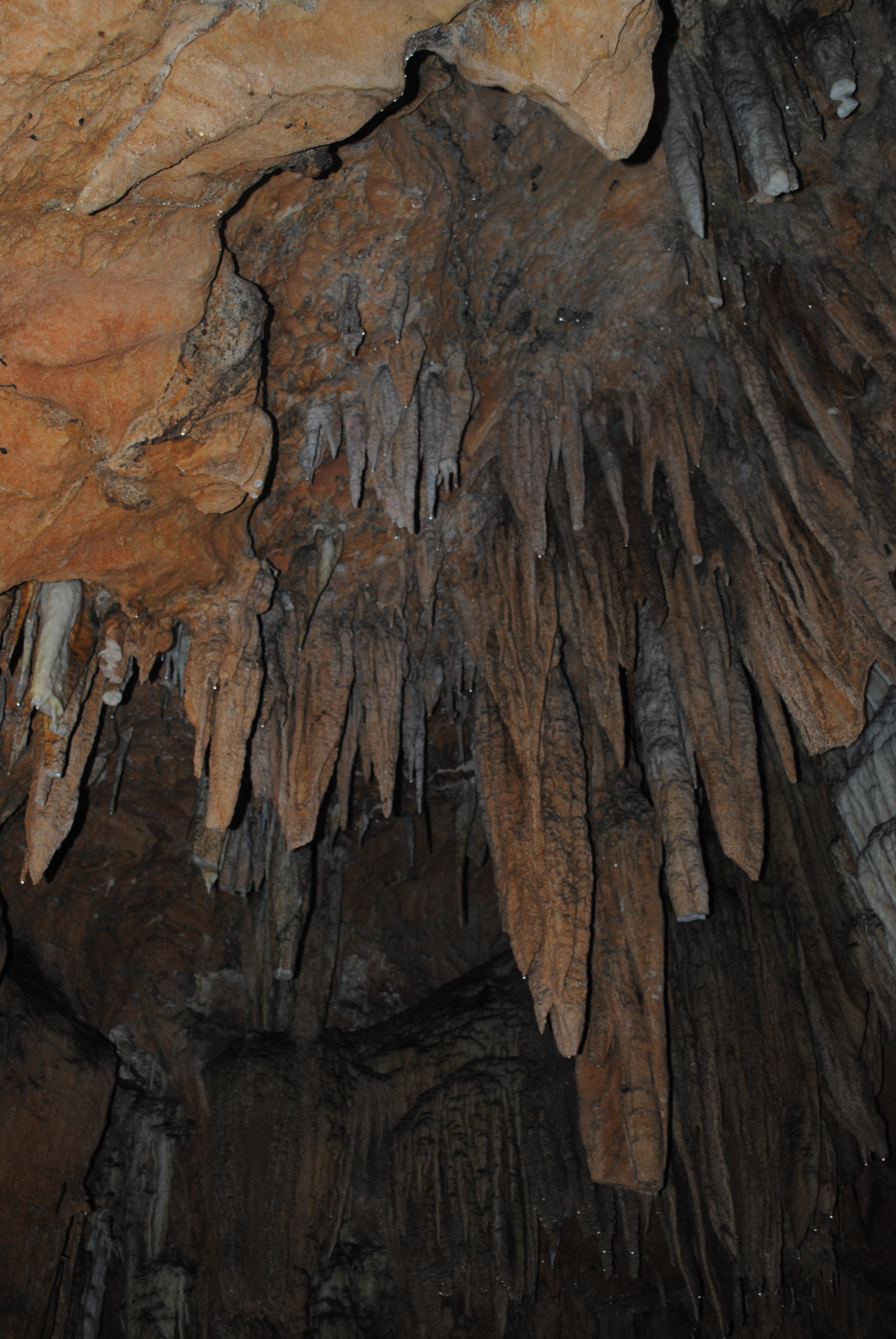
- Stalactites in the cave complex

- Location within Brazil
- Nearest city: Cerro Azul, Paraná
- Coordinates: 25°02′14″S 49°05′21″W
- Area: 336.98 ha (832.7 acres)
- Designation: State park
- Created: 20 July 1960
- Administrator: Instituto Ambiental do Paraná - IAP

The Campinhos State Park (Portuguese: Parque Estadual de Campinhos) is a state park in the state of Paraná, Brazil. The environment has been much degraded by human activity and is in the process of regeneration, but there are areas of the original Araucaria Forest. The main attraction is the 500 metres (1,600 ft) long Jesuits Cave, with many speleothems such as stalagmites and stalactites.

== Location ==
The Campinhos State Park is divided between the municipalities of Tunas do Paraná and Cerro Azul in the north of the metropolitan region of Curitiba, Paraná. It has an area of 336.98 hectares (832.7 acres) and a perimeter of 10,012 metres (32,848 ft). 4.22% is in Tunas of Paraná and 95.78% in Cerro Azul. The buffer zone covers about 6,143 hectares (15,180 acres) and includes parts of the municipalities of Tunas do Paraná, Cerro Azul, Bocaiúva do Sul and Rio Branco do Sul. It includes the basins of the Pulador and Ermida streams. The park is 63 kilometres (39 mi) from the state capital of Curitiba and 8 kilometres (5.0 mi) from Tunas do Paraná. The main access to the Park is by Federal Highway BR-476.

The region is mountainous, with average elevation of about 900 metres (3,000 ft). It has many limestone caves. The Gruta dos Jesuítas (Jesuits Cave) is the fifth largest of the state. The park is in the Ribeira de Iguape River basin, with an average elevation of 330 metres (1,080 ft), and is drained by part of the Pulador sub-basin. Outside the park the Pulador joins the Tigre River to form the Ponta Grossa River, a right tributary of the Ribeira.

== History ==
The Campinhos State Park was created by state decree 31.013 of 20 July 1960. The main objective was to protect the caves of Conjunto Jesuítas/Fada, one of the most important caving sites of Paraná. It was expanded by state decree 5.768 of 5 June 2002. The consultative council was created by IAP decree 010 of 18 February 2003 with representatives of public and private bodies. The Management Plan was developed by GEEP - Açungui, financed by the National Environment Fund. Preparation included workshops with the community to gain consensus on activities and priorities. It was published in April 2003.

== Environment ==
The Köppen climate classification is Cfb: subtropical humid mesothermal without a defined dry season. Annual average temperature is 16 to 18 °C (61 to 64 °F), with monthly averages ranging from 13 to 21 °C (55 to 70 °F). Average annual precipitation is 1,400 to 1,500 millimetres (55 to 59 in), with relative humidity of 80% to 85%.

The park was originally covered in mixed montane rainforest, but due to human exploitation little of the original coverage remains. It is presently in the process of regeneration. There are fragments of the original Araucaria Forest, which contain species such as Brazilian walnut (Ocotea porosa), Paraná pine (Araucaria angustifolia), yerba mate (Ilex paraguariensis), cedar (Cedrela fissilis) and Brazilian oak (Roupala brasiliensis). Fauna include crab-eating fox (Cerdocyon thous), brocket deer (Mazama species), Brazilian squirrel (Sciurus aestuans), azure jay (Cyanocorax caeruleus), jacu (Penelope species) and endangered species such as lowland paca (Cuniculus paca) and oncilla (Leopardus tigrinus).

Conflicting activities include hunting, uncontrolled visiting, invasion by exotic species, a road inside the conservation unit and maintenance of a high voltage power transmission line.

== Visiting ==
Visits are mainly by organized groups accompanied by guides for educational purposes. As of 2017 the park was open from 9:00 to 16:00 from Tuesday to Friday. Groups of over 15 visitors require prior scheduling. The responsible person must ensure that the members of the group are aware of the park rules, both for the safety of the visitors and to preserve the environment of the park. Camping, making fires, hunting and fishing are not allowed. Visitors must stay on the marked paths and do nothing to damage the environment.

The park has parking, accommodation for volunteers and researchers, garbage bins, a kiosk, benches and picnic tables, toilets and showers. The visitor center has media projection equipment, a lecture room, restrooms and administration areas. The visitor center provides environmental education. The main attraction is the Gruta dos Jesuítas (Jesuit's Cave) with a length of about 500 metres (1,600 ft) of large halls that contain many beautiful speleothems such as stalagmites, stalactites, columns, curtains and travertines. The Gruta da Fada is open only to pre-authorized groups for environmental education or research. There is a 900 metres (3,000 ft) Forest Trail where visitors can learn about the native plant species.

== Sources ==
- Parque Estadual de Campinhos (in Portuguese), IAP: Instituto Ambiental do Paraná
- Rasca Rodrigues, Lindsley da Silva (18 February 2003), Portaria IAP nº 010, de 18 de Fevereiro de 2003 (in Portuguese), IAP: Instituto Ambiental do Paraná
- Sessegolo, Gisele Cristina; Oliveira, Karina Luiza de; Rocha, Luís Fernando Silva da (April 2003), Plano de Manejo Parque Estadual de Campinhos (PDF) (in Portuguese), Curitiba, archived from the original (PDF) on 2017-02-07
