= Mining in Brazil =

Major industry in Brazil, South America

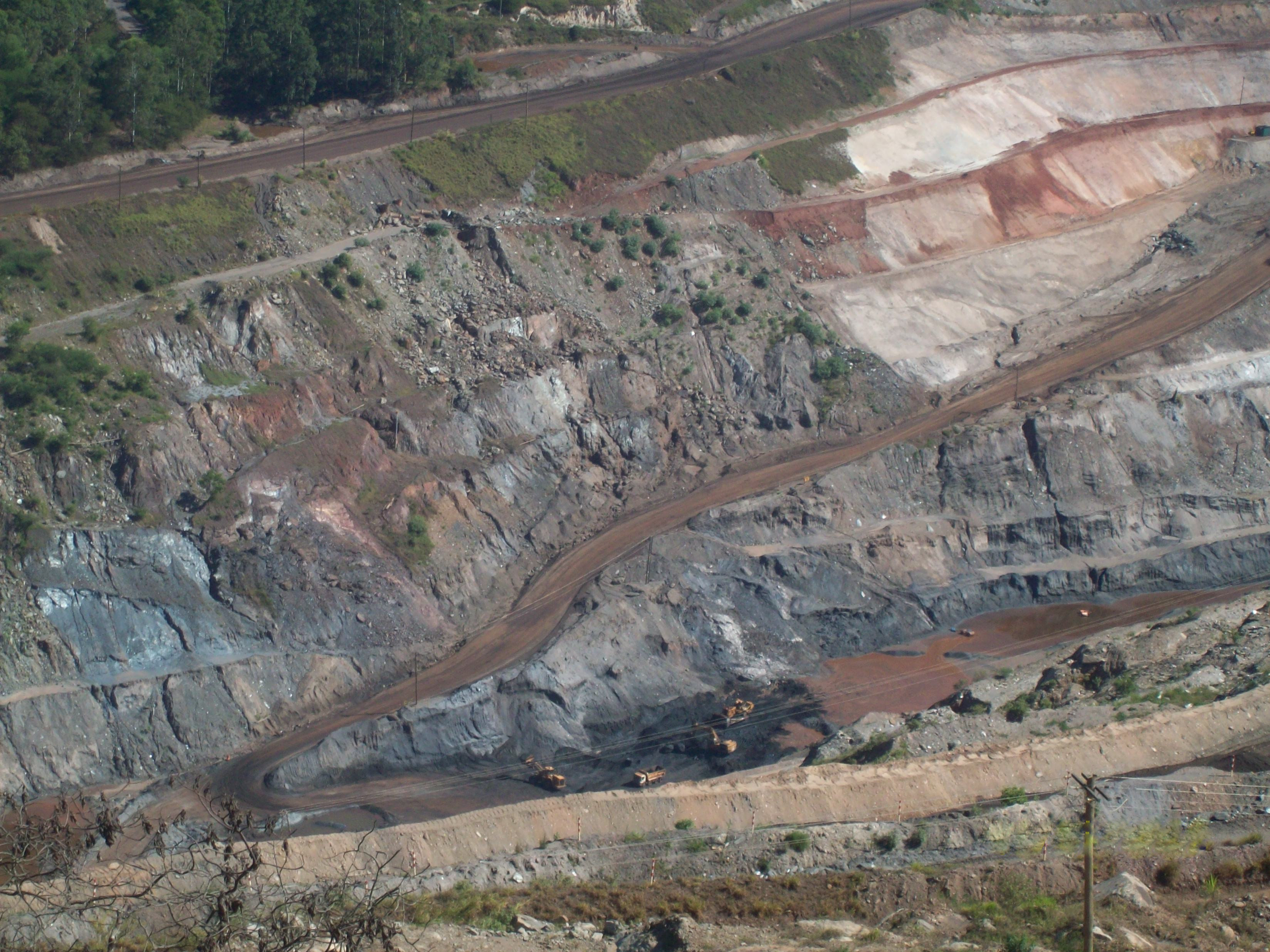
Iron mine in Itabira, Minas Gerais

Mining in Brazil is centered on the extraction of iron (the second largest global iron ore exporter), copper, gold, aluminum (bauxite-one of the 5 biggest world's productors), manganese (one of the 5 biggest world's productors), tin (one of the biggest world's productors), niobium (concentrates 98% of the known niobium reserves in the world), and nickel. About gemstones, Brazil is the world's largest producer of amethyst, topaz, agate and is a big producer of tourmaline, emerald, aquamarine, garnet and opal.

== History ==
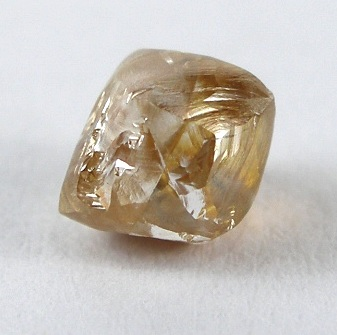
Diamond crystal extracted in Diamantina.

- Discovery of first gold rush in 1680s, gold discoveries made in streams not far from present day city of Belo Horizonte.
- In 1729 diamonds were discovered in the same area. This started a diamond rush.
- By 1760 nearly half of the world's gold was from Brazil.
- In the early 18th century nearly 400,000 Portuguese immigrants came to mine in southern Brazil.
- Over half a million African slaves were shipped to work in the gold mines.
- The Gongo Soco gold mine, operated by the Imperial Brazilian Mining Association of Cornwall using skilled Cornish miners and unskilled slaves, produced over 12,000 kilograms (26,000 lb) of gold between 1826 and 1856.

== Present ==
In 2019, Brazil's figures were as follows: it was the world's largest producer of niobium (88.9 thousand tons); the 2nd largest world producer of tantalum (430 tons); the 2nd largest world producer of iron ore (405 million tons); the 4th largest world producer of manganese (1.74 million tons); the 4th largest world producer of bauxite (34 million tons); the 4th largest world producer of vanadium (5.94 thousand tons); the 5th largest world producer of lithium (2.4 thousand tons); the 6th largest world producer of tin (14 thousand tons); the 8th largest world producer of nickel (60.6 thousand tons); the 8th largest world producer of phosphate (4.7 million tons); the 12th largest world producer of gold (90 tons); the 14th largest world producer of copper (360 thousand tons); the 14th largest world producer of titanium (25 thousand tons); the 13th largest world producer of gypsum (3 million tons); the 3rd largest world producer of graphite (96 thousand tons); the 21st largest world producer of sulfur (500 thousand tons); the 9th largest world producer of salt (7.4 million tons); besides having had a chromium production of 200 thousand tons.

=== Metallic ores ===
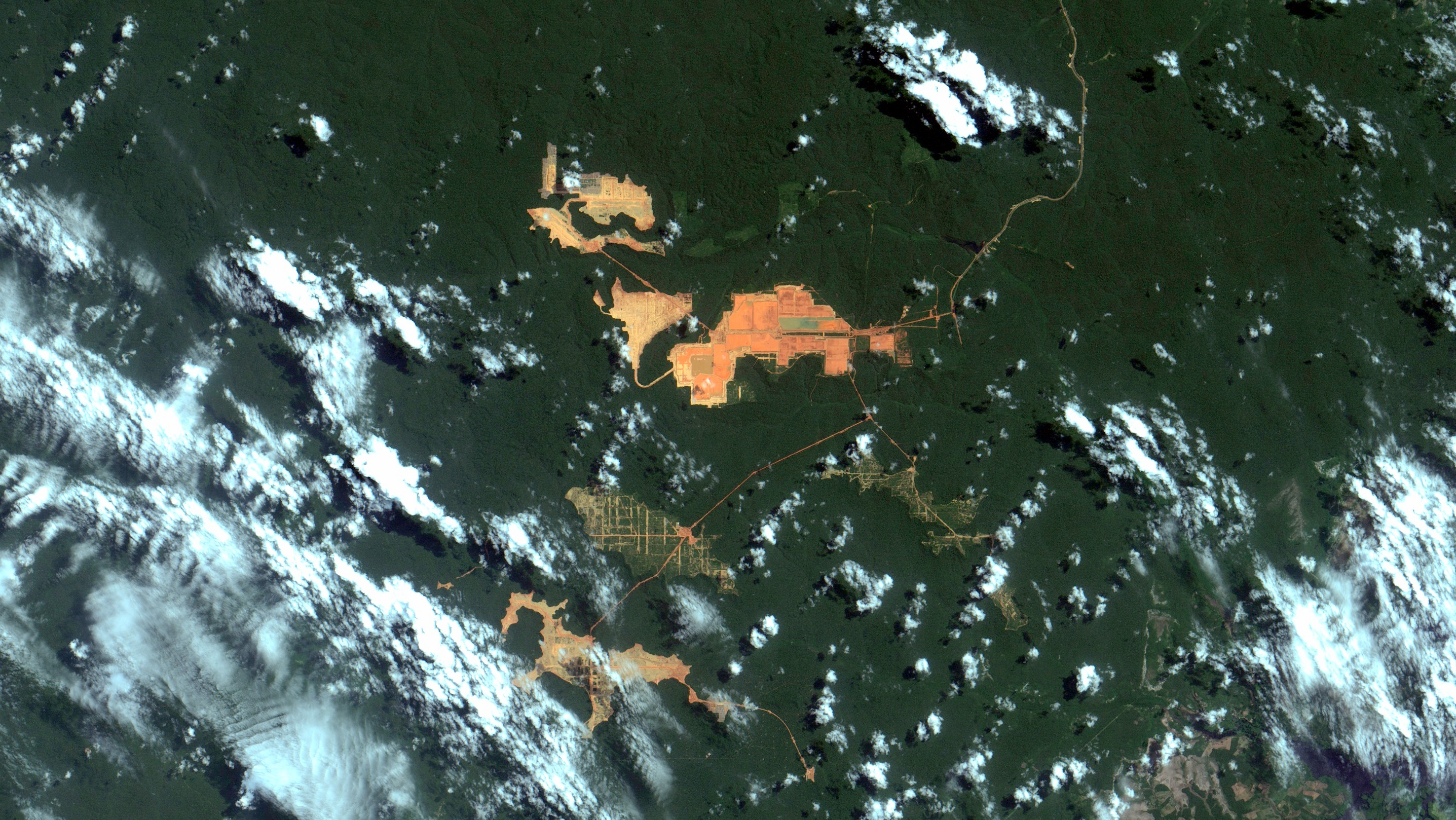
Extraction of bauxite in Pará

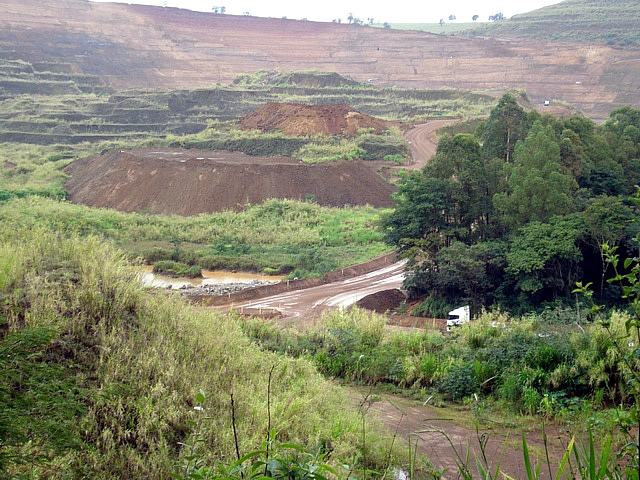
Extraction of niobium in Araxá, Minas Gerais

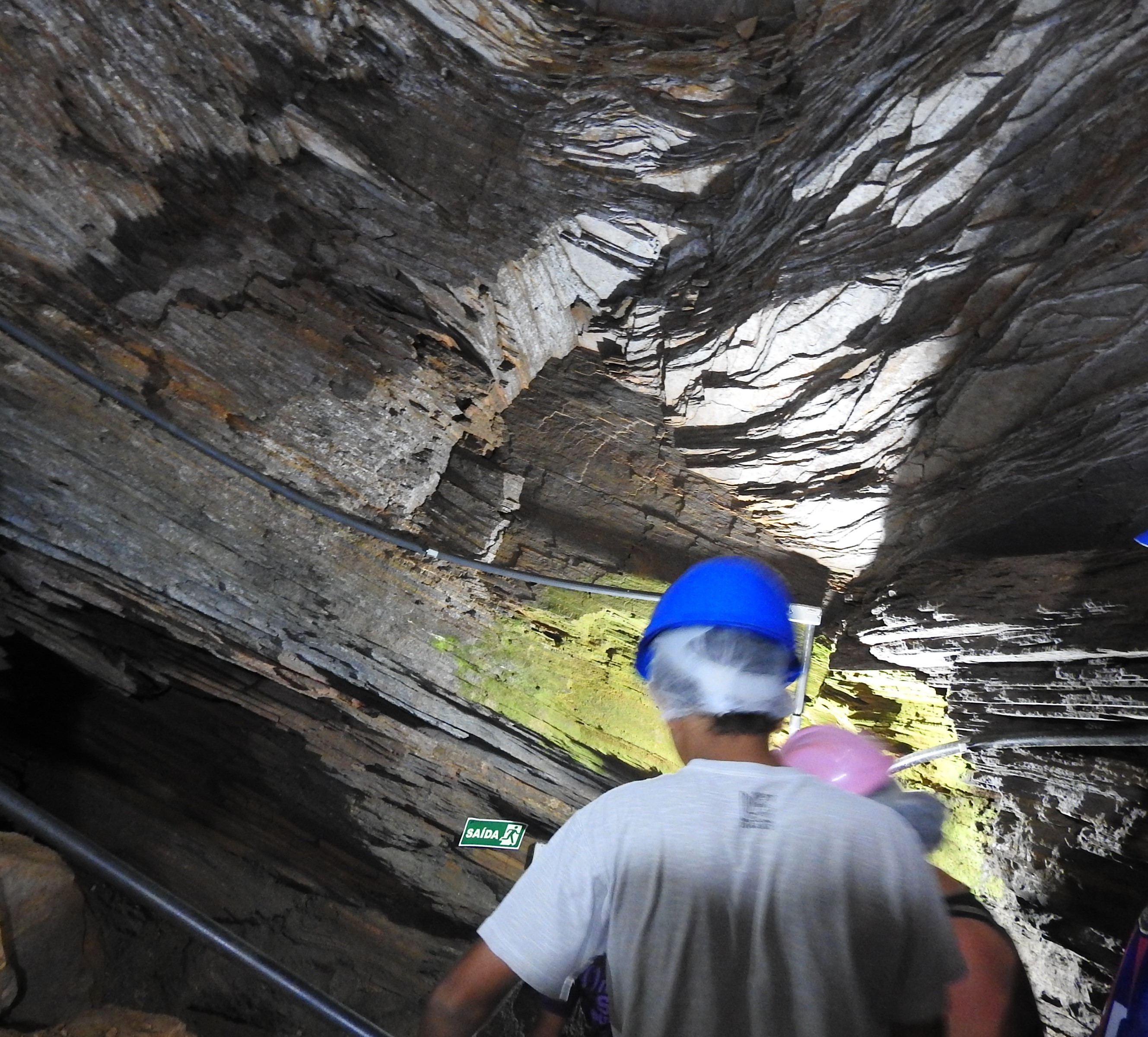
Gold mine dated 1714, located in Ouro Preto, Minas Gerais

In 2016, metallic ores totaled close to 77% of the total value of Brazilian mineral production that was sold. Eight elements totaled 98.6% of the value: aluminum, copper, tin, iron, manganese, niobium, nickel and gold. The biggest Brazilian highlight is in iron, which has the majority of the participation, whose production is mostly carried out in the states of Minas Gerais and Pará. According to the National Department of Mineral Production (DNPM), in 2011 there were 8,870 mining companies in the country, and in the Southeast Region, this number reached 3,609, about 40% of the total. In the Southeast region, iron ore, gold, manganese and bauxite stand out in the Quadrilátero Ferrífero; niobium and phosphate in Araxá; gems, in Governador Valadares; and graphite, in Salto da Divisa, all in the state of Minas Gerais; in addition to aggregates, in São Paulo and Rio de Janeiro, and ornamental rocks, in Espírito Santo. The mining sector's revenue in Brazil was R$153.4 billion in 2019. Exports were U$32.5 billion. The country's iron ore production was 410 million tons in 2019. Brazil is the second largest global iron ore exporter and has the second position in the reserve ranking: under Brazilian soil there are at least 29 billion tons . The largest reserves are currently in the states of Minas Gerais and Pará. According to data from 2013, Minas Gerais is the largest Brazilian mining state. With mining activity in more than 250 municipalities, and more than 300 mines in operation, the state has 40 of the 100 largest mines in Brazil. In addition, of the 10 largest mining municipalities, seven are in Minas, with Itabira being the largest in the country. It is also responsible for approximately 53% of the Brazilian production of metallic minerals and 29% of the total minerals, in addition to extracting over 160 million tons/year of iron ore. Vale S.A. is the main company active in the production of iron ore in the state. The state is the largest employer in the mineral activity (53,791 workers in 2011). São Paulo, the second largest employer, had 19 thousand employees in the sector this year.

In 2017, in the Southeast Region, the numbers were as follows: Minas Gerais was the country's largest producer of iron (277 million tons at a value of R$37.2 billion), gold (29.3 tons at a value of R$3.6 billion), zinc (400 thousand tons at a value of R$351 million) and niobium (in the form of pyrochlorine) (131 thousand tons at a value of R$254 million). In addition, Minas was the 2nd largest producer of aluminum (bauxite) (1.47 million tons at a value of R$105 million), 3rd of manganese (296 thousand tons at a value of R$32 million) and 5º of tin (206 tons at a value of R$4.7 million). Minas Gerais had 47.19% of the value of mineral production traded in Brazil, with R$41.7 billion.

In 2017, in terms of production traded throughout the Northern Region, in the iron ore sector, Pará was the 2nd largest national producer, with 169 million tons (of the 450 million produced by the country), at a value of R$25.5 billion. Amapá produced 91.5 thousand tons. In copper, Pará produced almost 980 thousand tons (of the 1.28 million tons in Brazil), at a value of R$6.5 billion. In aluminum (bauxite), Pará carried out almost all Brazilian production (34.5 of 36.7 million tons) at a value of R$3 billion. In manganese, Pará produced a large part of Brazilian production (2.3 of 3.4 million tons) at a value of R$1 billion. In gold, Pará was the 3rd largest Brazilian producer, with 20 tons at a value of R$940 million. Amapá produced 4.2 tons at a value of R$540 million. Rondônia produced 1 ton at a value of R$125 million. In nickel, Goiás and Pará are the only two producers in the country, with Pará being the 2nd in production, having obtained 90 thousand tons at a value of R$750 million. In tin, the state of Amazonas was the largest producer (14.8 thousand tons, at a value of R$347 million), Rondônia was the 2nd largest producer (10,9 thousand tons, at a value of R$333 million) and Pará the 3rd largest producer (4.4 thousand tons, at a value of R$114 million). There was also production of niobium (in the form of columbita-tantalita) in Amazonas (8.8 thousand tons at R$44 million) and Rondônia (3.5 thousand tons at R$24 million), and zinc in gross form in Rondônia (26 thousand tons at R$27 million). Pará had 42.93% of the value of commercialized mineral production in Brazil, with almost R$38 billion, Amapá had 0.62% of the value, with R$551 million, Rondônia had 0.62% of the value, with R$544 million, Amazonas had 0.45% of the amount with R$396 million, and Tocantins had 0.003% of the amount with R$2.4 million.

In the Midwest Region, Goiás stands out, with 4.58% of the national mineral participation (3rd place in the country). In 2017, at nickel, Goiás and Pará are the only two producers in the country, Goiás being the 1st in production, having obtained 154 thousand tons at a value of R$1.4 billion. In copper, it was the 2nd largest producer in the country, with 242 thousand tons, at a value of R$1.4 billion. In gold, it was the 4th largest producer in the country, with 10.2 tons, at a value of R$823 million. In niobium (in the form of pyrochlorine), it was the 2nd largest producer in the country, with 27 thousand tons, at a value of R$312 million. In aluminum (bauxite), it was the 3rd largest producer in the country, with 766 thousand tons, at a value of R$51 million.

Still in 2017, in the Midwest, Mato Grosso had 1.15% of the national mineral participation (5th place in the country) and Mato Grosso do Sul had 0.71% of the national mineral participation (6th place in the country). Mato Grosso had production of gold (8.3 tons at a value of R$1 billion) and tin (536 tons at a value of R$16 million). Mato Grosso do Sul had production of iron (3.1 million tons at a value of R$324 million) and manganese (648 thousand tons at a value of R$299 million).

In Northeast Region, Bahia stands out, with 1.68% of the national mineral participation (4th place in the country). In 2017, at gold, it produced 6.2 tons, at a value of R$730 million. At copper, it produced 56 thousand tons, at a value of R$404 million. At chrome, it produced 520 thousand tons, at a value of R$254 million. In vanadium, it produced 358 thousand tons, at a value of R$91 million.

=== Coal ===
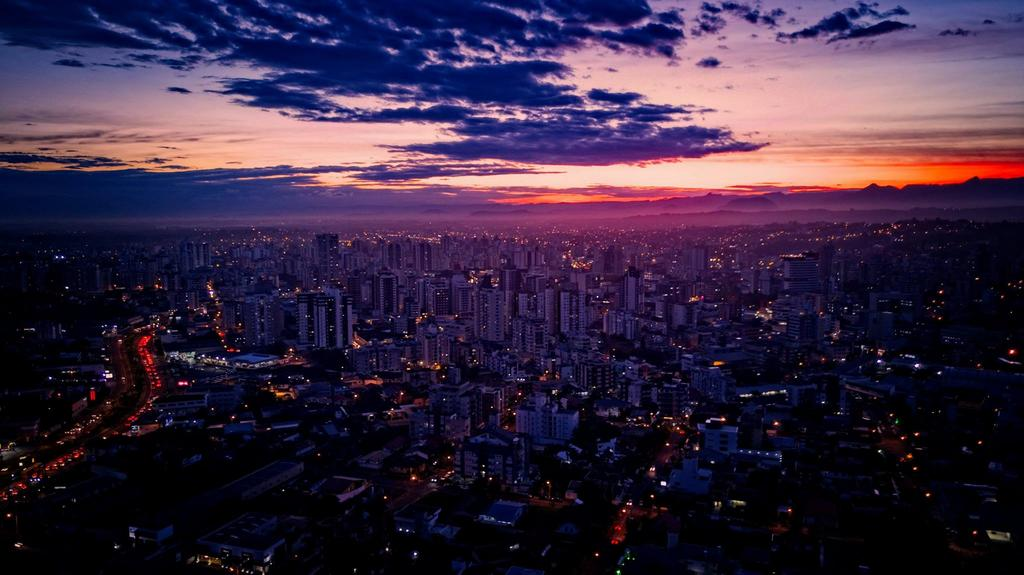
Sunset in Criciúma.

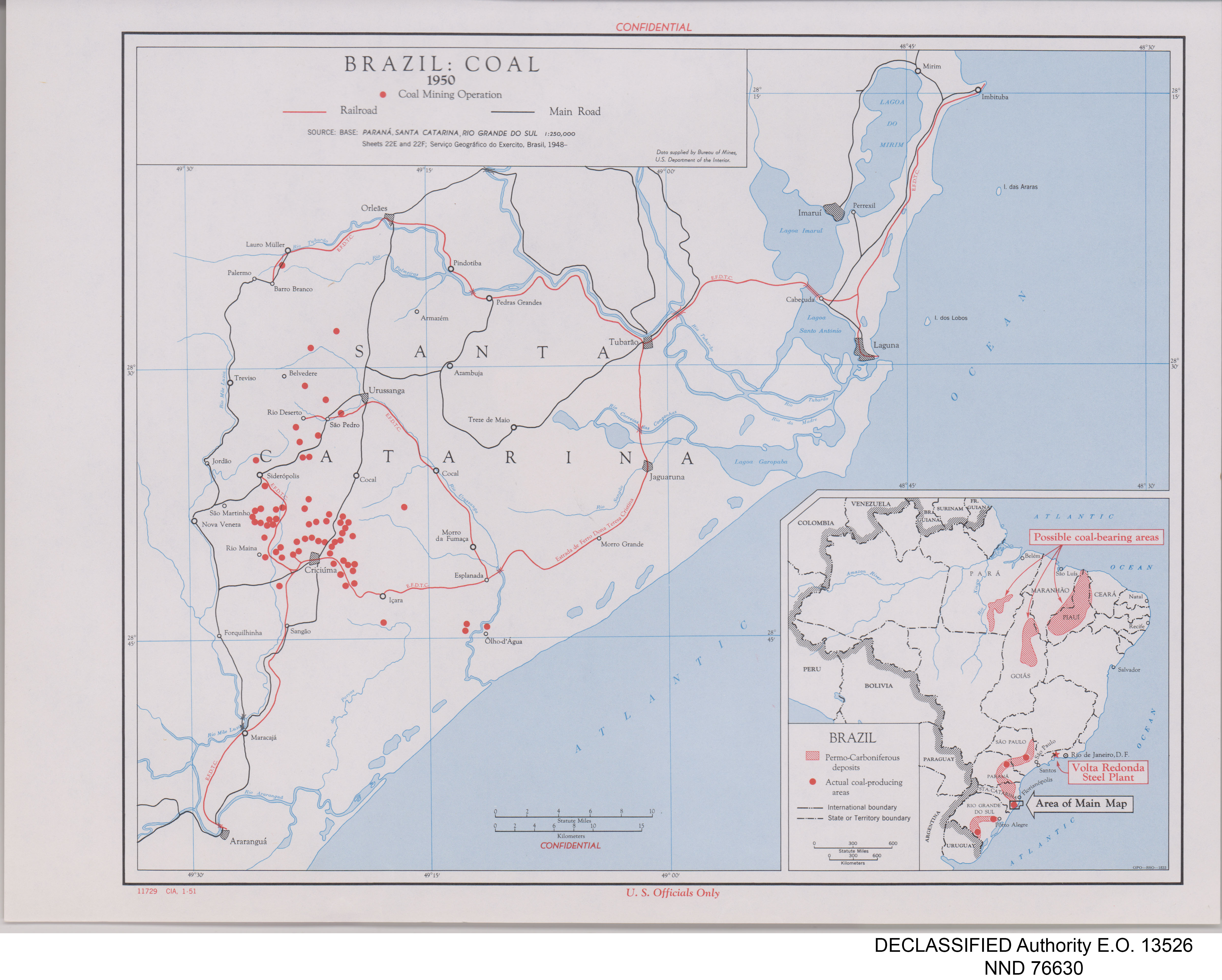
Coal mines in Brazil, 1950

Santa Catarina is the largest coal producer in Brazil, mainly in the city of Criciúma and surroundings. The production of crude mineral coal in Brazil was 13.6 million tons in 2007. Santa Catarina produced 8.7 Mt (million tons); Rio Grande do Sul, 4.5 Mt; and Paraná, 0.4 Mt. Despite the extraction of mineral coal in Brazil, the country still needs to import about 50% of the coal consumed, as the coal produced in the country is of low quality, as it has a lower concentration of carbon. Among the countries that supply Brazil with mineral coal is South Africa, USA and Australia. Mineral coal in Brazil supplies, in particular, thermoelectric plants that consume about 85% of production. The cement industry in the country, on the other hand, is supplied with approximately 6% of this coal, leaving 4% for the production of cellulose paper and only 5% in the food, ceramics and grains industries. Brazil has reserves of peat, lignite and hard coal. Coal totals 32 billion tons of reserves and is mainly in Rio Grande do Sul (89.25% of the total), followed by Santa Catarina (10.41%). The Candiota Deposit (in Rio Grande do Sul) alone has 38% of all national coal. As it's a coal of inferior quality, it's used only in the generation of thermoelectric energy and at the site of the deposit. The oil crisis in the 1970s led the Brazilian government to create the Energy Mobilization Plan, with intense research to discover new coal reserves. The Geological Survey of Brazil, through works carried out in Rio Grande do Sul and Santa Catarina, greatly increased the reserves of coal previously known, between 1970 and 1986 (mainly between 1978 and 1983). Good quality coal, suitable for use in metallurgy and in large volume (seven billion tons), was then discovered in several deposits in Rio Grande do Sul (Morungava, Chico Lomã, Santa Teresinha), but at relatively great depths (up to 1,200 m), which has hindered its use until now. In 2011, coal accounted for only 5.6% of the energy consumed in Brazil, but it is an important strategic source, which can be activated when, for example, the water levels in the dams are very low, reducing excessively the supply of water. hydroelectric power. This happened in 2013, when several thermoelectric plants were then shut down, thus maintaining the necessary supply, albeit at a higher cost.

=== Gemstones ===
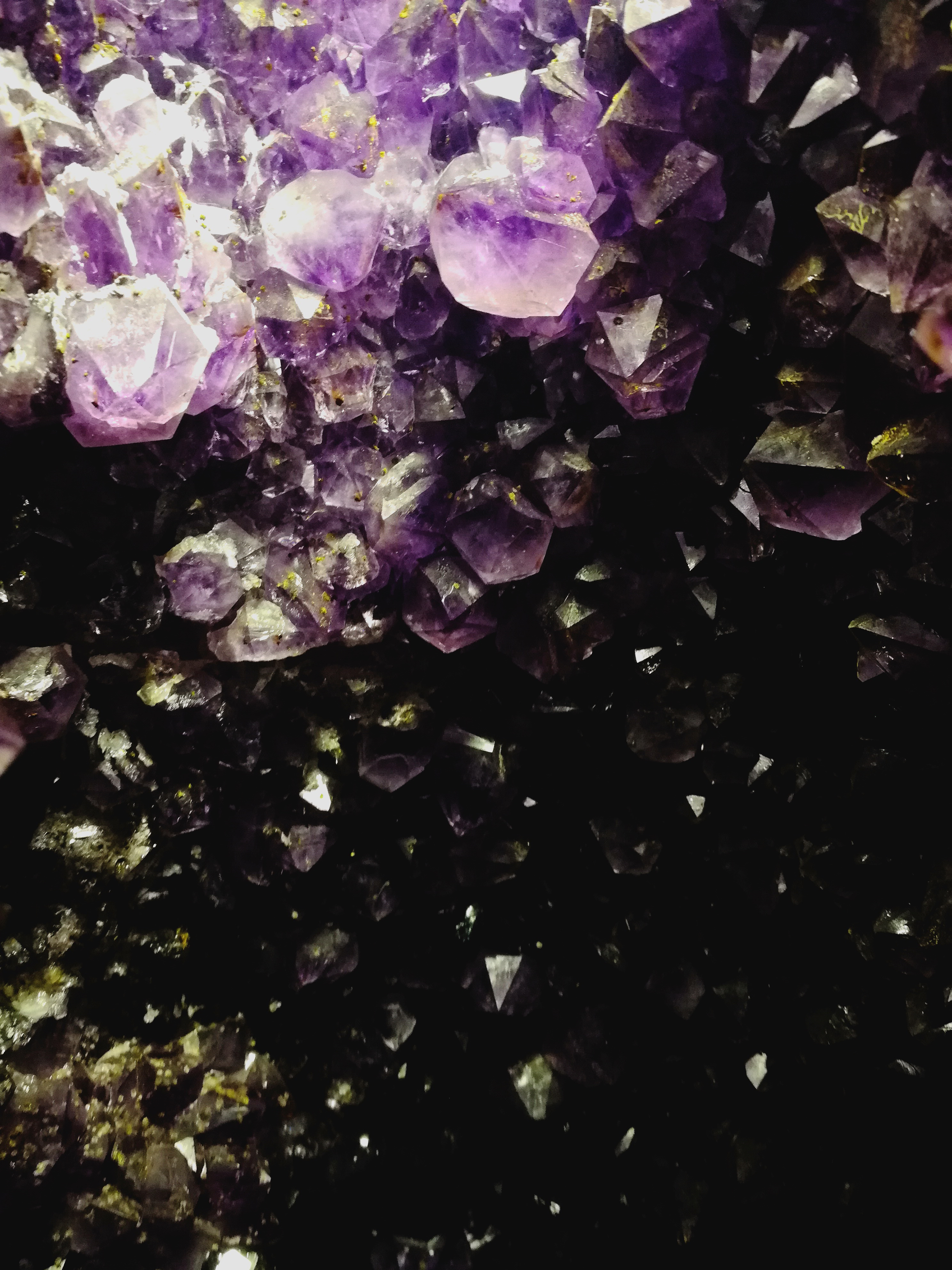
Amethyst mine in Ametista do Sul, Rio Grande do Sul.

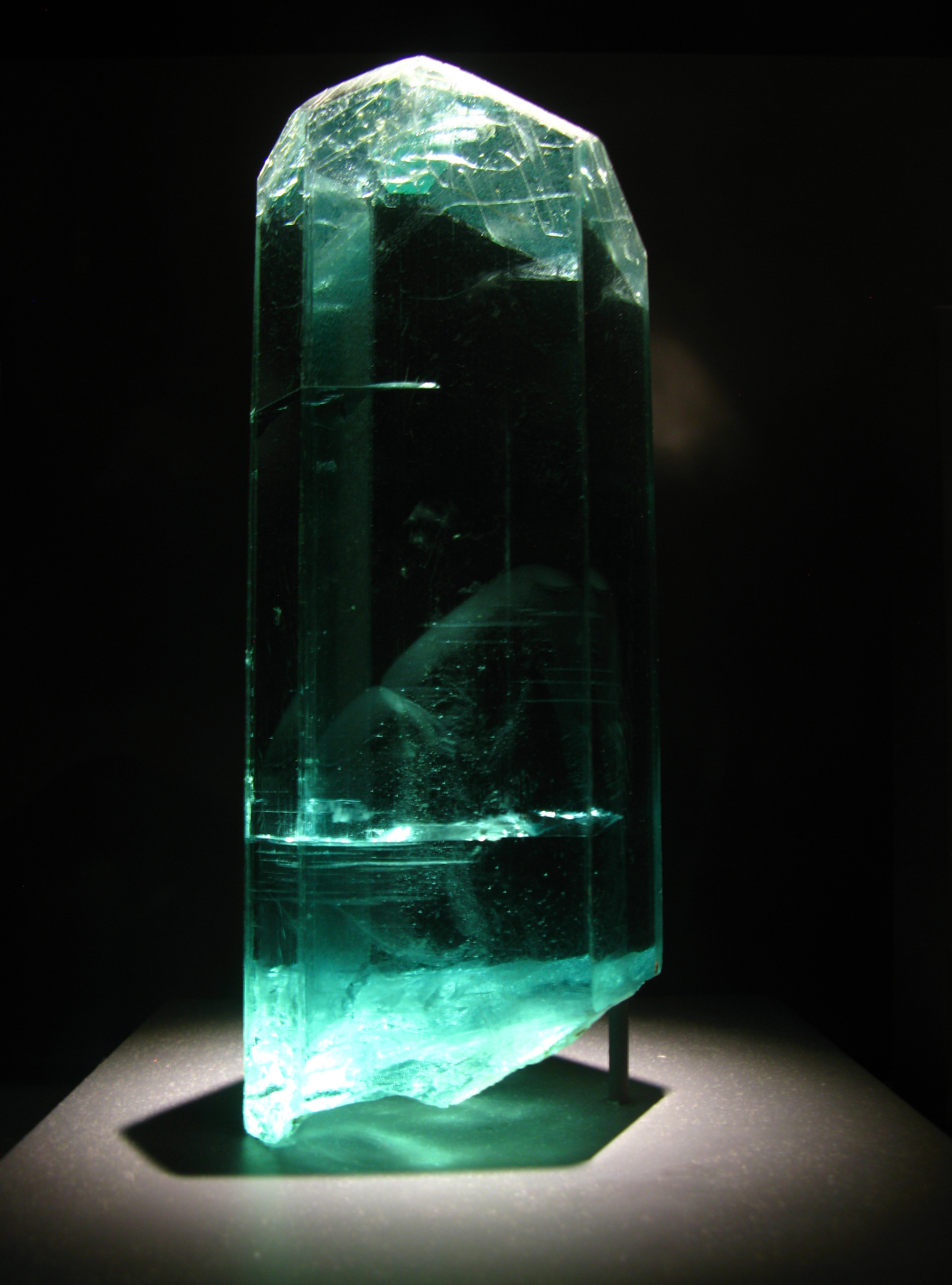
Aquamarine of Minas Gerais

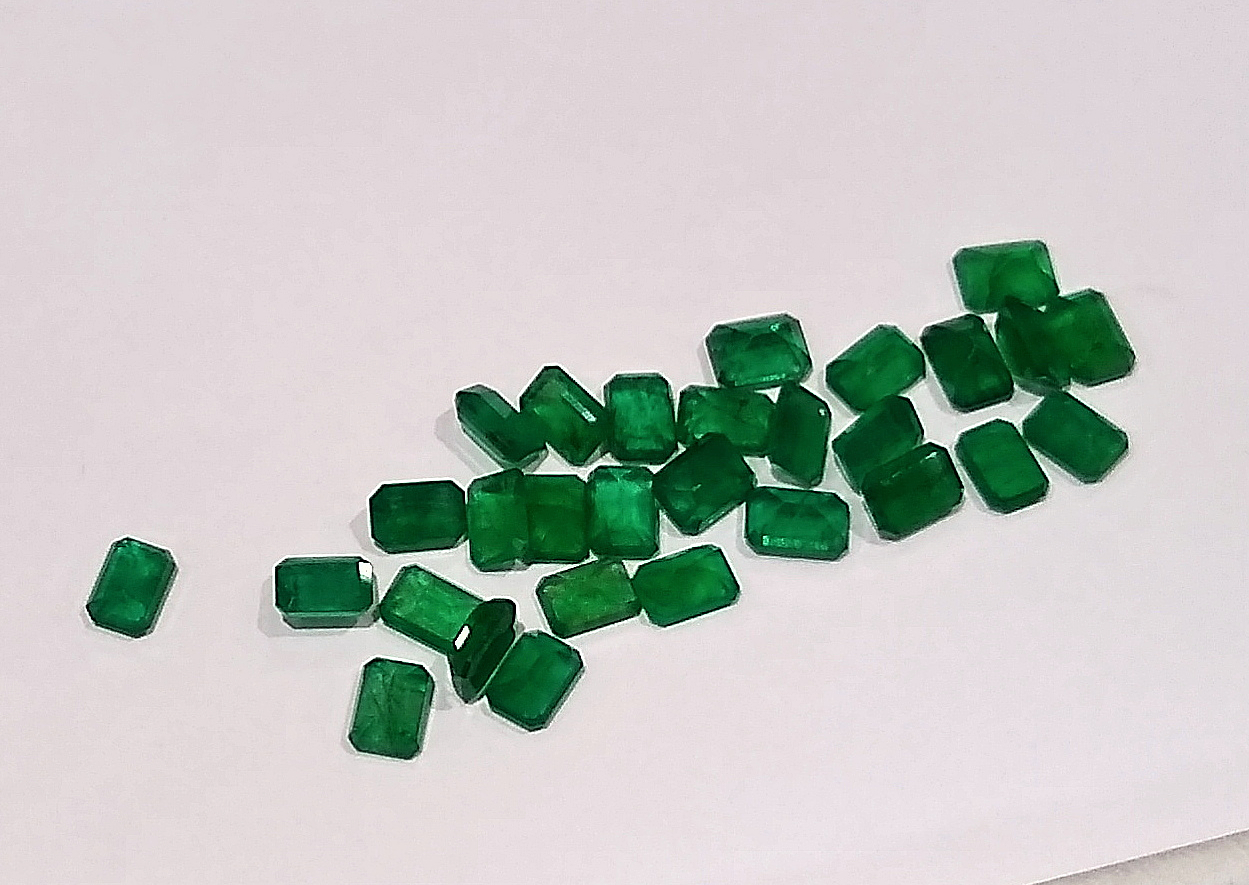
Brazilian emeralds

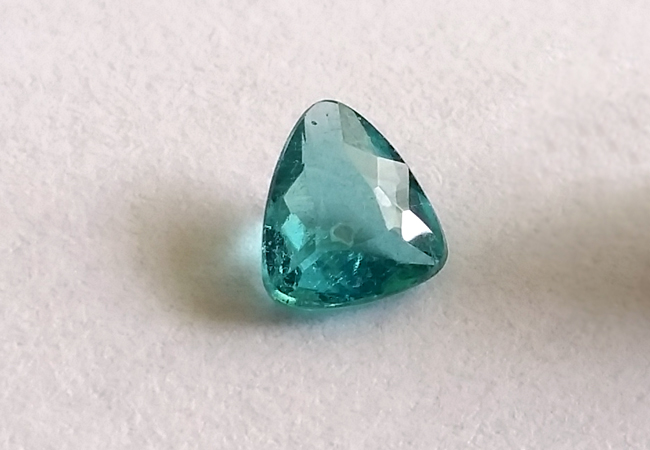
Paraíba Tourmaline.

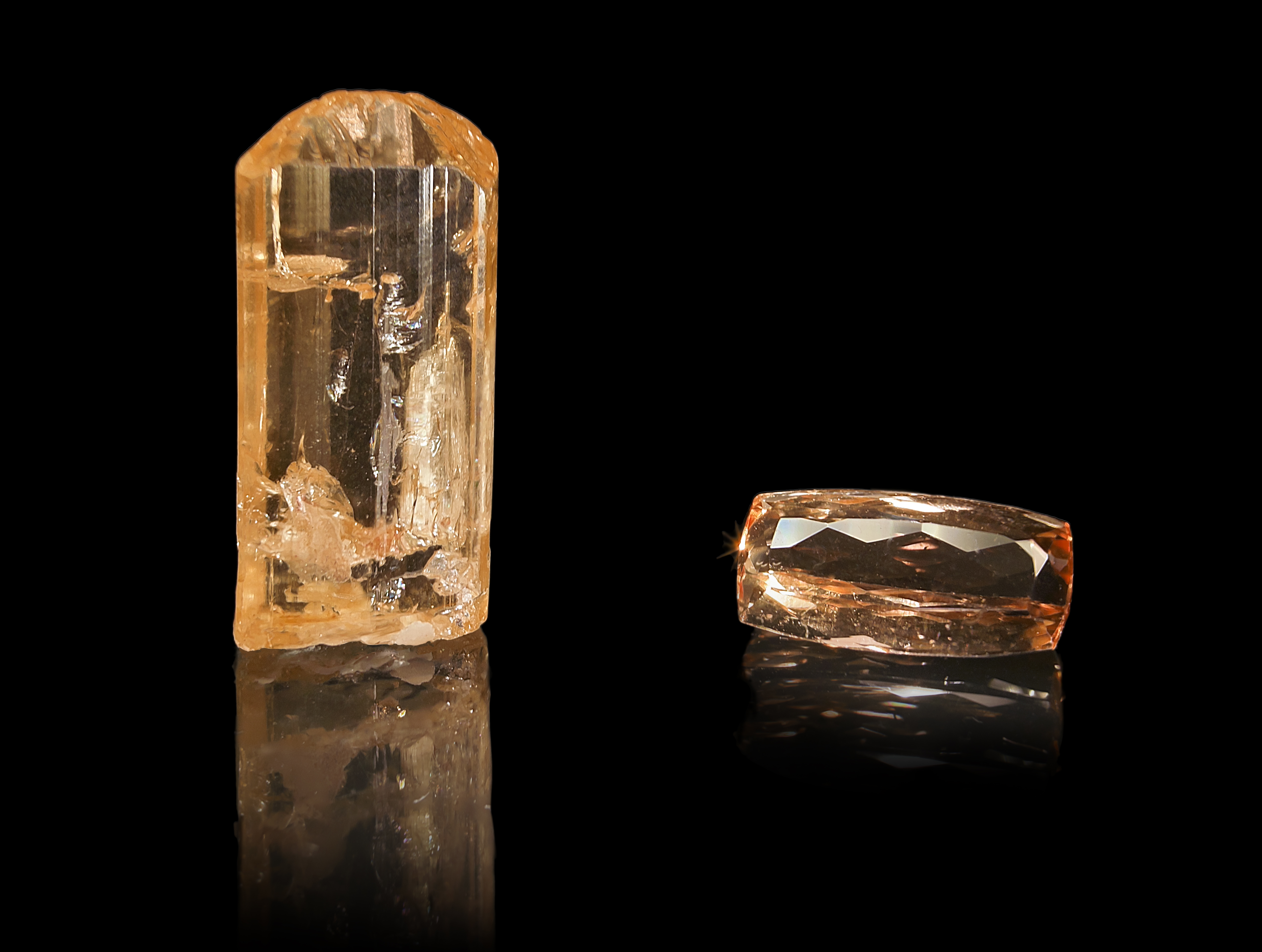
Imperial topaz of Minas Gerais

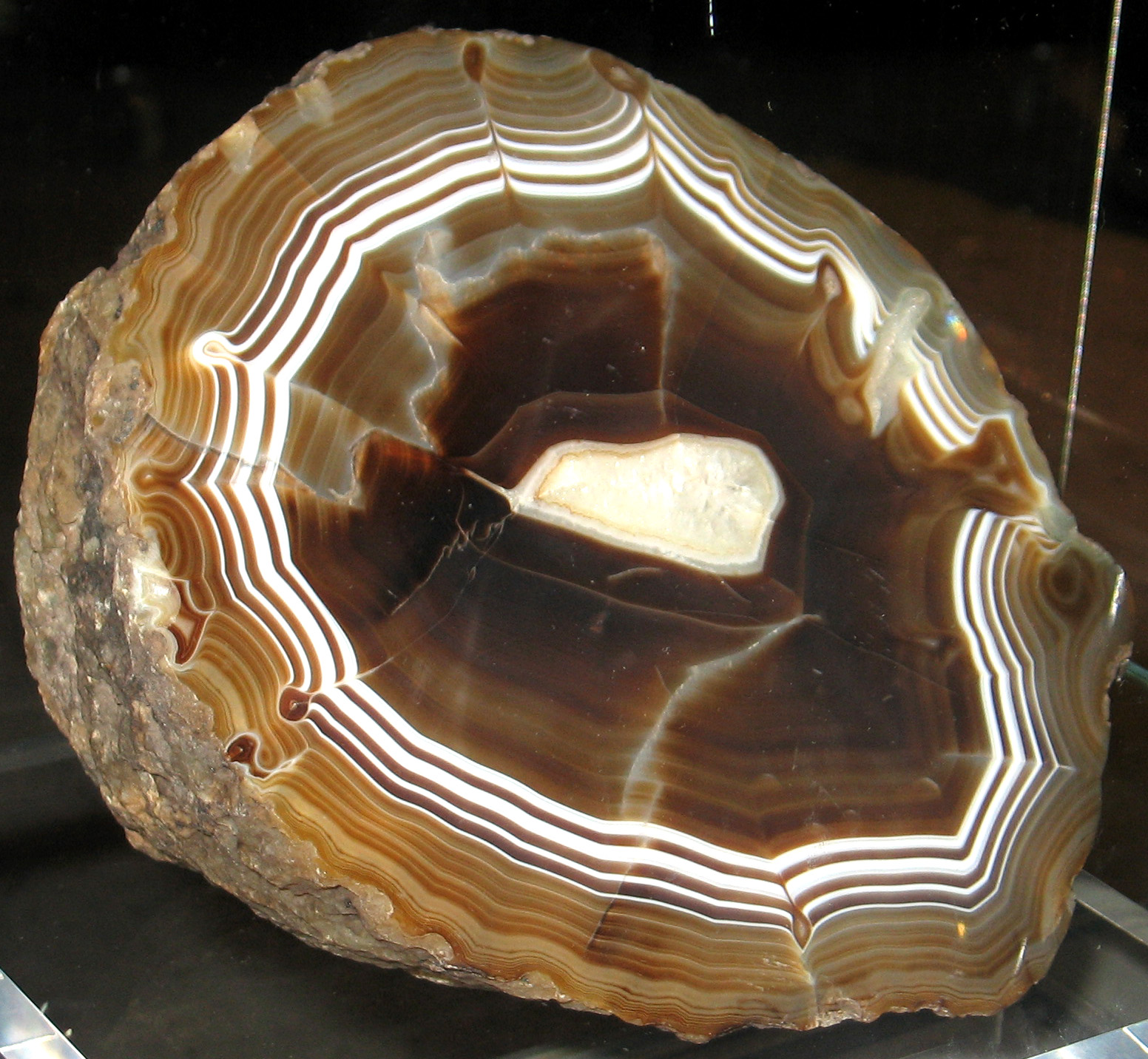
Brazilian agate

Brazil is the world's largest producer of agate. Rio Grande do Sul is the largest producer, with local extraction since 1830. There is also extraction in Minas Gerais and Bahia. In aquamarine, Minas Gerais produces the most valuable stones in the world. This gem is also produced in Espírito Santo, Rio Grande do Norte, Ceará, Alagoas and Paraíba. The largest world producer of amethyst is Brazil, in the states of Rio Grande do Sul mainly, and secondarily, in Bahia. The largest producer of amethyst in Brazil is the city of Ametista do Sul, in Rio Grande do Sul. This stone was very rare and expensive worldwide, until the discovery of large deposits in Brazil, causing its value to drop considerably.

Brazil was the largest producer of diamond in the world from 1730 to 1870. Mining first occurred in the Serra da Canastra, Diamantina region, and then, in 1850, in Bahia, even dropping the price of stone worldwide due excess production. Today, Brazil produces close to 1 million carats a year, mainly in the State of Minas Gerais, but also in Mato Grosso, Mato Grosso do Sul, Bahia, Paraná and Roraima. Virtually all states in the country have diamonds.

Regarding emerald, the largest producers in the world are: Colombia, Zambia, Zimbabwe, Tanzania, Madagascar and Brazil. It is produced in the states of Goiás, Bahia and Minas Gerais. In garnet, Brazil is not one of the largest producers, but there is extraction in Minas Gerais, Espírito Santo, Bahia, Paraíba, Ceará, Rondônia and Rio Grande do Norte . In Brazil there are also some jasper in Minas Gerais, Mato Grosso, Paraná and Rio Grande do Sul. Another rare stone to be found in Brazil is opal, but there are deposits in Piauí, Bahia, Ceará and in Rio Grande do Sul. Ruby is also rare in Brazil, being found in Bahia and Santa Catarina. Sapphire is also scarce in Brazil, but can be found in Mato Grosso, Goiás, Santa Catarina and Minas Gerais. In the topaz, Brazil has the most valuable variety in the world, the imperial topaz, only produced in Ouro Preto-MG. In addition, the country is the world's top producer of topaz. It is also among the world's largest producers of tourmaline, in the states of Minas Gerais, Ceará, Goiás and Bahia. Brazil produces the rarest and most expensive variety of tourmaline in the world, Paraíba tourmaline, which, in addition to Paraíba, is only found in three other places in the world: in Brazil (at the state of Rio Grande do Norte) and Africa (at Nigeria and Mozambique). But none of them offers a higher quality stone than São José da Batalha. In turquoise, there is only a small production in Bahia.

== Environmental Impact ==
=== Amazon Forest ===
Illegal mining has had a severe environmental impact, especially within the Amazon forest. A 2017 study in Nature Communications calculated that illegal mining caused 11,670 km^{2} of deforestation, or nine percent of all Brazilian deforestation, between 2005 and 2015. This number has grown to over 127,000 through 2025. While the mines themselves create deforestation, the infrastructure needed to support the mines leads to additional forest loss. Housing for workers, development of supply chains, airstrips, and mining waste concerns have caused extra deforestation around the mines. Statistically, 60 percent of all mining activity being in the Amazon forest and 1.65 million km^{2} of land. The amount of land has led to a loss of biodiversity in the forest and had threatened native wildlife in the region.

=== Indigenous Land ===
Illegal mining and dumping are other impacts on the Amazon forest. There are many illegal gold mines in the depths of the Amazon, mainly on indigenous lands. With these mines having no regulation or approval, they cause hardship to the forest and the people living there. As a result, seven million tons of sometimes toxic waste into the indigenous lands of Munduruku, Yanomami, and Sai Cinza in 2022 alone. These areas are home to 30 million people, mostly indigenous. These impacts have been greater than those of deforestation. As 6 out of 10 Munduruku people in 2020 had mercury contamination at levels above what the WHO (World Health Organization) considers safe.

== See also ==
- Brazil Gold Rush
- Coal mining in Brazil
- Gold mining in Brazil
- Mining in Paraná
- List of countries by iron ore production
- List of countries by copper production
- List of countries by gold production
- List of countries by bauxite production
- List of countries by manganese production
- List of countries by tin production
- List of countries by nickel production
- List of countries by coal production
