= Roupala loxensis =

Conservation status
- Vulnerable (IUCN 2.3)

Scientific classification
- Kingdom: Plantae
- Clade: Tracheophytes
- Clade: Angiosperms
- Clade: Eudicots
- Order: Proteales
- Family: Proteaceae
- Genus: Roupala
- Species: R. loxensis

Binomial name
- Roupala loxensis I.M.Johnst.

Species of plant endemic to Ecuador

Roupala loxensis is a species of plant in the family Proteaceae. It is endemic to Ecuador.
