= Pico Agudo (Japira) =

Coordinates: 23.75369°S 50.1946595°W

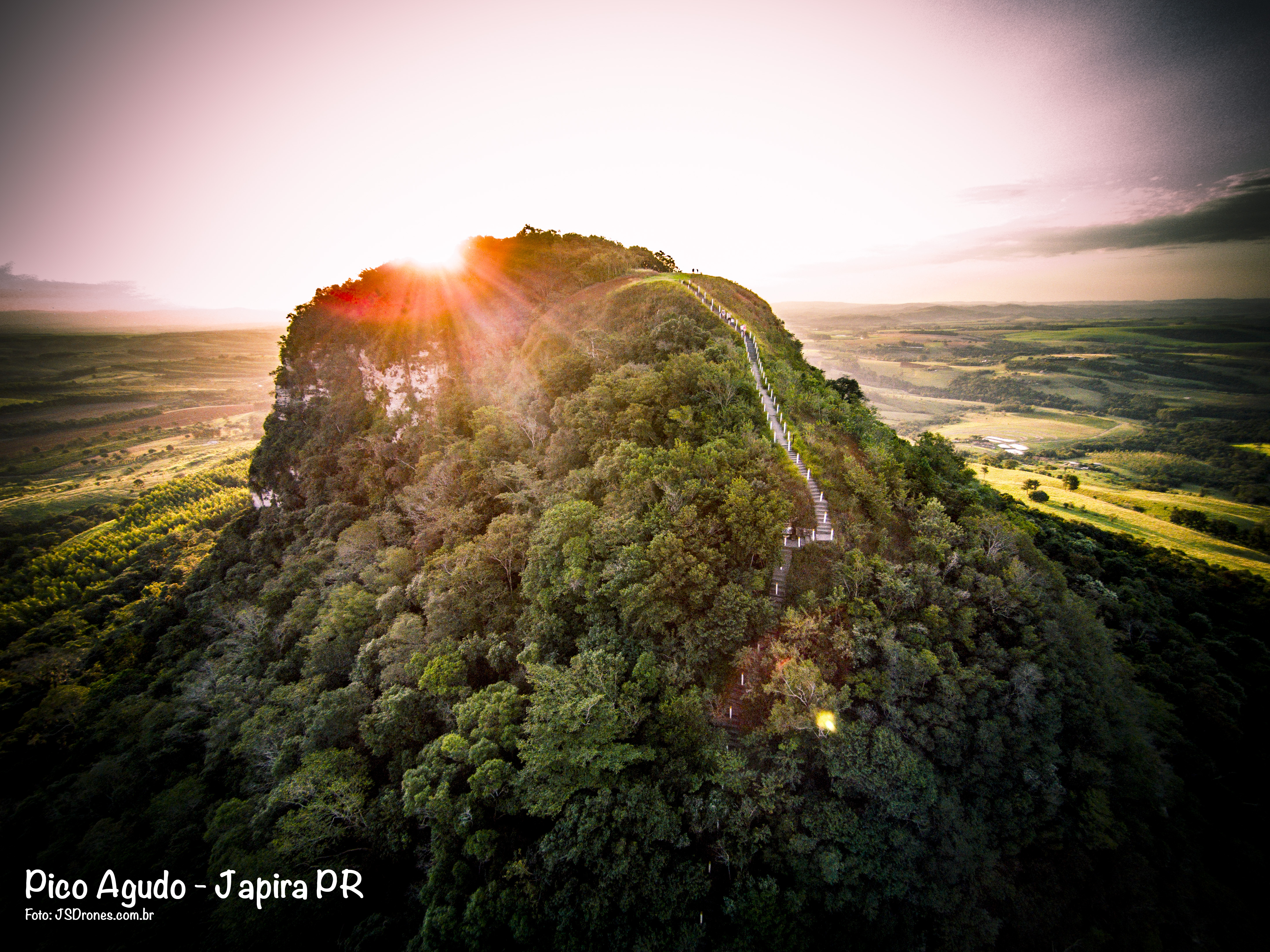
Aerial photo of Pico Agudo in Japira

The Pico Agudo is a mountain in Brazil, near the town of Japira in Paraná.

It is about 960 metres (3,150 ft) high. It overlooks the BR-153 road, the Transbrasiliana Highway, about 8km North of Ibaiti.

It is a location for hang gliding and paragliding. Annual championships are held there between October and November.
