= Tunas do Paraná =

Coordinates: 24.9739°S 49.0858°W

- Municipality
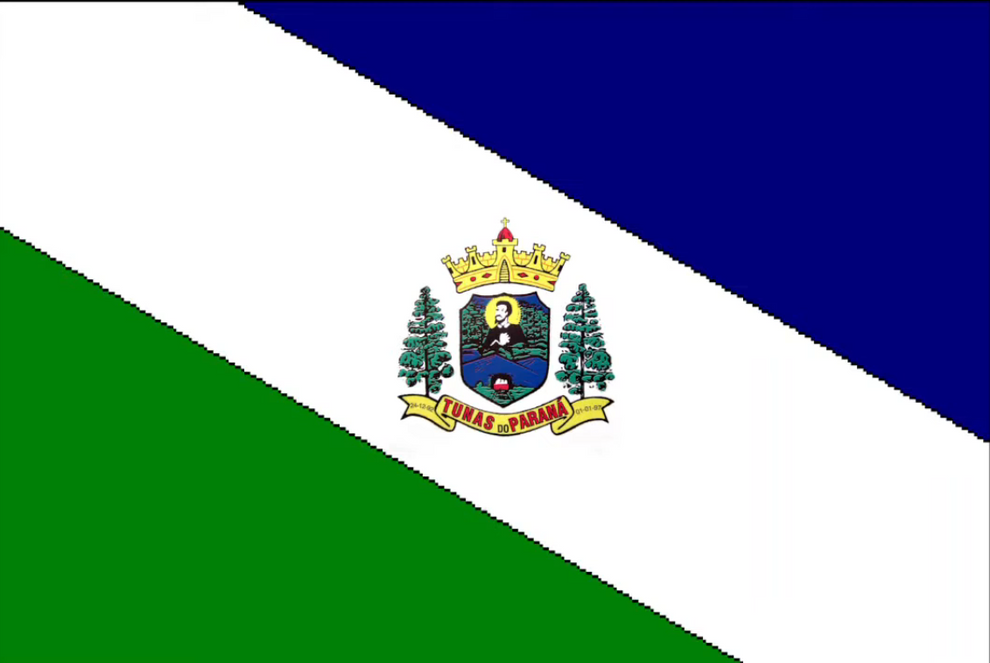
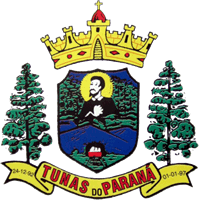
- Flag Coat of arms
- Interactive map of Tunas do Paraná
- Country: Brazil
- Region: Southern
- State: Paraná
- Mesoregion: Metropolitana de Curitiba

Population (2020)
  - Total: 9,022
- Time zone: UTC−3 (BRT)

Tunas do Paraná is a municipality in the state of Paraná in the Southern Region of Brazil.

The municipality contains part of the 337 hectares (830 acres) Campinhos State Park, created in 1960.

== See also ==
- List of municipalities in Paraná
