= Roupala brachybotrys =

Conservation status
- Least Concern (IUCN 3.1)

Scientific classification
- Kingdom: Plantae
- Clade: Tracheophytes
- Clade: Angiosperms
- Clade: Eudicots
- Order: Proteales
- Family: Proteaceae
- Genus: Roupala
- Species: R. brachybotrys

Binomial name
- Roupala brachybotrys I.M.Johnst.

Species of plant endemic to Ecuador

Roupala brachybotrys is a species of plant in the family Proteaceae. It is endemic to Ecuador.
