= Roupala pinnata =

Conservation status
- Vulnerable (IUCN 2.3)

Scientific classification
- Kingdom: Plantae
- Clade: Tracheophytes
- Clade: Angiosperms
- Clade: Eudicots
- Order: Proteales
- Family: Proteaceae
- Genus: Roupala
- Species: R. pinnata

Binomial name
- Roupala pinnata Lam.

Species of plant endemic to Peru

Roupala pinnata is a species of plant in the family Proteaceae. It is endemic to Peru.
