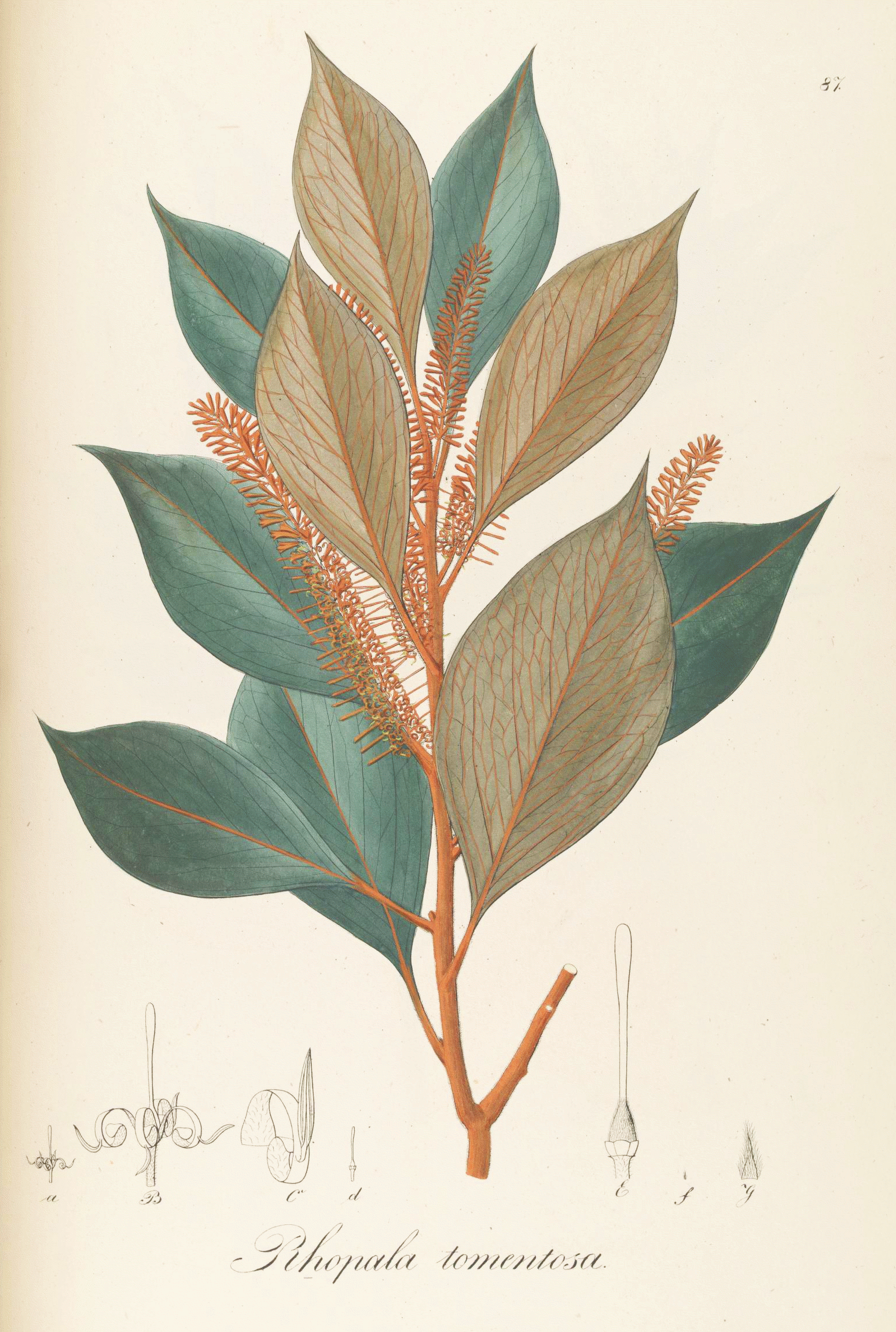
- Roupala tomentosa is a synonym of R. montana var. paraensis.

Scientific classification
- Kingdom: Plantae
- Clade: Tracheophytes
- Clade: Angiosperms
- Clade: Eudicots
- Order: Proteales
- Family: Proteaceae
- Subfamily: Grevilleoideae
- Tribe: Roupaleae
- Subtribe: Roupalinae
- Genus: Roupala; Aubl.

Type species
- Roupala montana Aubl.

= Roupala =

Genus of plants from Mexico to Argentina

Roupala is a Neotropical genus of woody shrubs and trees in the plant family Proteaceae. Its 34 species are generally found in forests from sea level to 4,000 m (13,000 ft) altitude from Mexico to Argentina.

== Taxonomy and naming ==
The genus was described by Jean Baptiste Christophore Fusée Aublet in 1775, its name derived from a local name roupale in French Guiana.

In their 1975 monograph on the Proteaceae, Lawrie Johnson and Barbara Briggs placed it in a subtribe Roupalinae alongside the New Caledonian genus Kermadecia as the genera had similar floral parts and leaves. Both taxa also have 14 chromosome pairs.

In 2006, the family's classification was redefined using molecular data. Here, Roupala emerged as a sister to the genera Orites and Neorites, with Knightia as the next most closely related taxon, while Kermadecia was not related. They thus placed the first three genera in the subtribe Roupalinae, conceding that the next closest relatives of this group is unclear. This group lies within the subfamily Grevilleoideae.

The genus likely originated in Gondwana before South America split away around 110 million years ago, and then spread into Central America in the Miocene around six million years ago when the Americas came into contact with each other. Clock dating with molecular and fossil data indicated ancestors of the genus may have split from Neorites in the mid-Oligocene around 30 million years ago, and that this lineage in turn separated from the ancestors of Orites in the late Eocene around 36 million years ago.

== Species ==
Ten species are threatened, principally by habitat destruction. Four of these (R. barnettiae, R. percoriacea, R. thomesiana and R. tobagensis) are only known from a single collection of each species, as is Roupala gertii, newly described in 2012.

The genus includes the following species: with a 34th species being described by Prance in 2012.

- Roupala barnettiae, Dorr
- Roupala brachybotrys, I.M. Johnst.
- Roupala brasiliensis, Klotzsch
- Roupala gertii
- Roupala loxensis, I.M. Johnst.
- Roupala montana, Aubl.
- Roupala pinnata, (Ruiz Lopez & Pavon) Diels
- Roupala sphenophyllum, Diels ex Skinner

== Description ==
The species are woody shrubs or trees to 25 m (80 ft) high, often with hairy new growth. The leaves are compound or deeply lobed in younger plants, but are usually simple in mature plants. The flowers occur in racemes, known as inflorescences, and are followed by follicles containing one or two seeds. Accord to Prance and colleagues, Roupala species were "almost certainly" pollinated by insects, and have wind- and water-dispersed seeds (the latter being common in Amazonian forests subject to annual flooding).

Leaf morphology often changes over the lifespan of the plant in these species. Generally, juvenile plants have simple leaves, but these are replaced by compound leaves as the seedling age. These are usually replaced by simple leaves in mature adults, except in the case of R. asplenioides, the leaves of which are always compound. This pattern of leaf succession is seen as primitive in the Proteaceae.

== Distribution and habitat ==
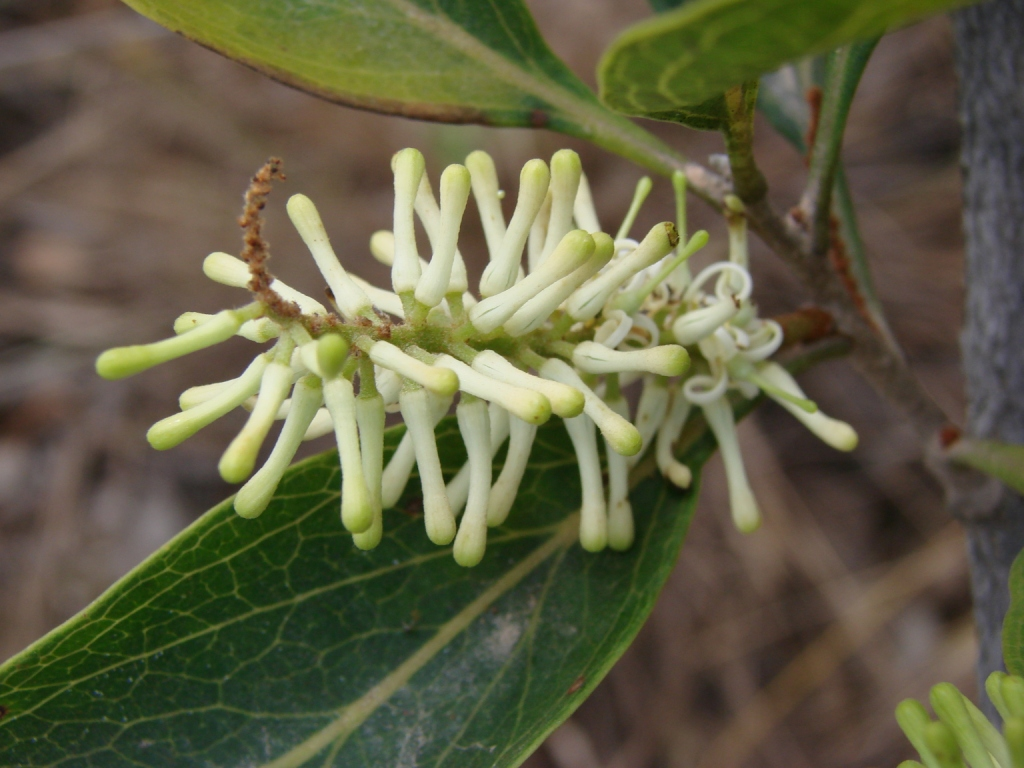
A widespread species, Roupala montana reaches Mexico, Trinidad and Argentina.

Found only in the neotropics, the members of the genus range from Mexico in the north, through central America and into Bolivia and Argentina in South America along the Andes, as well as the Amazon Basin in Brazil. They range from sea level to 4000 m in altitude, in rainforests, often near or along watercourses, and in cloud- or montane forests or scrub at higher altitudes. They are predominantly found on sandy soils.

The genus contains both widespread species and localised endemics. Roupala montana occurs throughout the entire range of the genus, from Mexico in the north, throughout Central America, to Trinidad and across South America to southern Brazil, Bolivia, Argentina and Paraguay. Other species have more restricted distributions. Several have an Andean distribution including R. monosperma which ranges from Venezuela to Bolivia, R. pachypoda found in Colombia, Ecuador and Peru, and R. fiebrigii which is endemic to Bolivia. Other species are found in the western or northern Amazon basin and Guiana Shield. Roupala sororopana is only known from tepuis in Venezuela and Suriname, while R. minima is restricted to plateaux between tepuis in Venezuela. Several species, including R. sculpta (known only from the São Paulo State Park Botanic Garden where it grows both wild and cultivated) and R. consimilis, are endemic to southern or southeastern Brazil. Central America supports three species in addition to the widespread R. montana: R. glaberrima which is found throughout Central America, R. loranthoides which is endemic to Guanacaste Province in Costa Rica, and R. percoriacea, a Panamanian endemic. At the northern extremes of the range of the species, R. mexicana is endemic to Mexico, while R. tobagensis is endemic to Tobago.

== Uses ==
Members of the genus are used for fuel wood, high quality charcoal, medicinally and to a limited extent for woodworking and construction. Roupala montana, R. meisneri, R. suaveolans, R. glaberrima, R. monosperma and R. pseudocordata are used for construction, woodworking, firewood and charcoal; R. montana and R. cordifolia are also used medicinally. In addition, R. montana is used as an aphrodisiac in Trinidad and Tobago and Venezuela.
