= Cerro Azul, Paraná =

Cerro Azul
- Municipality
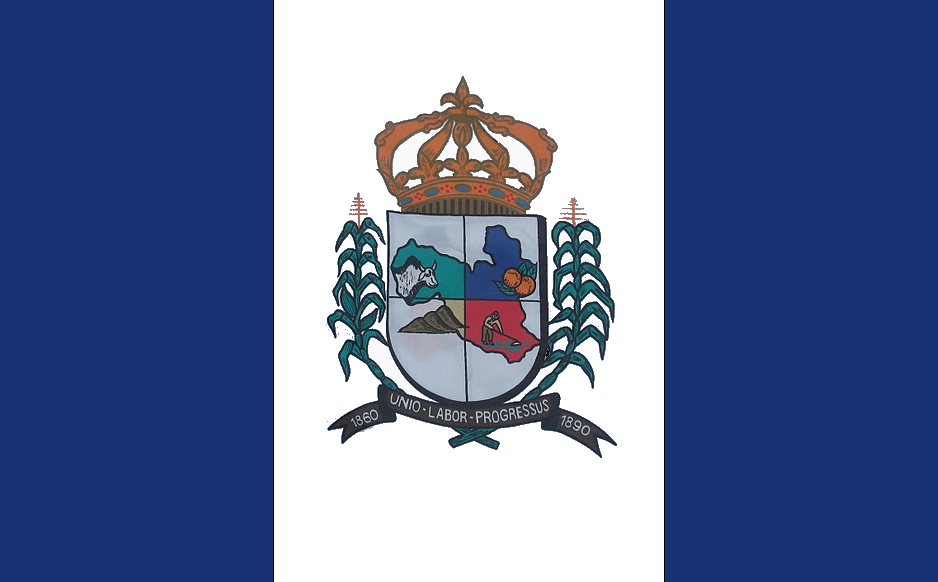
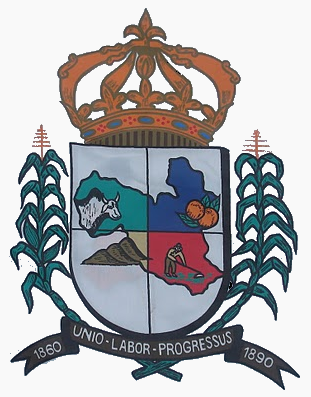
- Flag Coat of arms

- Location in Brazil
- Coordinates: 24°49′26″S 49°15′39″W
- Country: Brazil
- Region: Southern
- State: Paraná
- Mesoregion: Metropolitana de Curitiba

Population (2020)
  - Total: 17,833
- Time zone: UTC−3 (BRT)

Cerro Azul is a municipality in the state of Paraná in the Southern Region of Brazil.

The municipality contains part of the 337-hectare (830-acre) Campinhos State Park, created in 1960.

Cerro Azul is officially recognized as the National Capital of the ponkan tangerine (Capital Nacional da Ponkâ) under Federal Law No. 14,608/2023, due to its significant role in the country's citrus production.

== History ==
Cerro Azul was discovered in 1860 and became a municipality on 27 December 1897.

== Climate ==
Climate data for Cerro Azul, elevation 360 m (1,180 ft), (1976–2005 normals, extremes 1972–1997)
Month	Jan	Feb	Mar	Apr	May	Jun	Jul	Aug	Sep	Oct	Nov	Dec	Year
Record high °C (°F)	40.4 (104.7)	39.1 (102.4)	37.4 (99.3)	36.2 (97.2)	32.6 (90.7)	31.6 (88.9)	33.6 (92.5)	34.8 (94.6)	38.2 (100.8)	37.8 (100.0)	40.2 (104.4)	39.6 (103.3)	40.4 (104.7)
Mean daily maximum °C (°F)	31.7 (89.1)	31.7 (89.1)	30.5 (86.9)	28.2 (82.8)	24.9 (76.8)	22.4 (72.3)	23.0 (73.4)	24.6 (76.3)	25.3 (77.5)	27.8 (82.0)	30.1 (86.2)	31.1 (88.0)	27.6 (81.7)
Daily mean °C (°F)	24.4 (75.9)	24.4 (75.9)	23.3 (73.9)	20.9 (69.6)	17.6 (63.7)	15.3 (59.5)	15.2 (59.4)	16.5 (61.7)	18.2 (64.8)	20.6 (69.1)	22.5 (72.5)	23.9 (75.0)	20.2 (68.4)
Mean daily minimum °C (°F)	19.9 (67.8)	20.1 (68.2)	19.1 (66.4)	16.7 (62.1)	13.7 (56.7)	11.5 (52.7)	10.9 (51.6)	11.7 (53.1)	13.6 (56.5)	15.9 (60.6)	17.5 (63.5)	19.0 (66.2)	15.8 (60.5)
Record low °C (°F)	10.0 (50.0)	12.2 (54.0)	6.2 (43.2)	4.6 (40.3)	−1.4 (29.5)	−2.4 (27.7)	−2.0 (28.4)	−0.5 (31.1)	1.0 (33.8)	4.6 (40.3)	7.8 (46.0)	10.0 (50.0)	−2.4 (27.7)
Average precipitation mm (inches)	187.7 (7.39)	153.6 (6.05)	133.2 (5.24)	79.2 (3.12)	105.7 (4.16)	84.1 (3.31)	73.3 (2.89)	63.5 (2.50)	106.3 (4.19)	124.4 (4.90)	111.5 (4.39)	164.5 (6.48)	1,387 (54.62)
Average precipitation days (≥ 1.0 mm)	16	14	13	8	10	10	8	7	10	12	11	15	134
Average relative humidity (%)	80	80	81	82	85	86	84	81	79	77	75	76	81
Mean monthly sunshine hours	167.6	152.9	159.1	151.0	130.6	108.6	130.9	133.2	123.9	150.2	169.5	171.5	1,749
Source 1: Empresa Brasileira de Pesquisa Agropecuária (EMBRAPA)
Source 2: IDR-Paraná (precipitation days and sun 1972–1997)

== See also ==
- List of municipalities in Paraná
