= Coal mining in Brazil =

Coal mining in Brazil is an important part of the country's energy economy and is its largest source of non-renewable energy. Brazil is the eighth-largest energy consumer in the world and the third largest in the Western Hemisphere. Coal accounts for approximately 5.8 percent of the country's total primary energy supply. It is the country's largest source of non-renewable energy (50 percent), followed by nuclear energy (27 percent), petroleum (8 percent), and natural gas (2.5 percent). Brazil produces about 6 million tons of coal per year, and total coal reserves are estimated at 32.3 billion tons. Brazil's coal-mining region is located in the southern part of the country, and the reserves are distributed among the states of Paraná (1 percent), Santa Catarina (46 percent), and Rio Grande do Sul (53 percent). The southernmost state of Rio Grande do Sul has the majority of the coal reserves. However, Santa Catarina is the largest producer of coal. The total Brazilian coal production in 2007 was 12,144,564 short tons, with the state of Santa Catarina producing 7,228,895 of those.

There are some environmental concerns relating to coal mining. In the state of Santa Catarina alone, 3.5 million tons of coal are rejected annually and disposed of in landfills. This is more than half of Santa Catarina's total annual coal extraction. The Brazilian federal government has declared the state of Santa Catarina a site of environmental concern.

== History ==
Coal was discovered in the southern region of Brazil in 1822, and in the city of Lauro Müller in the state of Santa Catarina, Brazil in 1827 by an English company. The industry was underdeveloped until the middle of the 20th century, however, because the coal was of poor quality and expensive to transport domestically. Therefore, higher quality and cheaper coal was imported from England and Germany.

== Environmental impact ==
Coal mining activity has a large impact on the environment, especially in the areas directly surrounding the mines. These environmental problems are the result of over 120 years of unregulated mining activity, lack of accountability and enforcement regarding waste disposal, lack of knowledge, and different economic priorities. Since the first boom of coal exploration in the mid-20th century, immediate and long-term physical, chemical, and biological changes in local ecosystems have resulted from coal mining. Waste disposal poses one of the biggest environmental concerns in Brazilian coal mining. Brazilian coal is characterized by high sulfide contents, pyrite and marcasite. The waste contains a broad array of elements including metals such as copper, cobalt, mercury, arsenic, and zinc among others. The contact of this waste material with air and water results in acid mine drainage (AMD), which can be detrimental to terrestrial and aquatic ecosystems. Intense rains contribute to the seepage of waste deposits into the groundwater supply, generating and carrying the acid drainage from abandoned mines into the nearby rivers and streams. It increases turbidity and siltation, which in turn affects the food supply for the organisms in the affected areas. Seriously polluted sites may be environmentally hazardous despite the natural capacity of soils to reduce the solubility and bioavailability of toxic metals. Despite this capacity, environmental risks may persist at seriously polluted sites, including those that were abandoned decades ago. This is of relevance considering the 1000 abandoned mines in the state of Santa Catarina alone.

Waste disposal is the principal cause of water pollution in the state of Santa Catarina. Coal strip mining methods and the surface disposal of waste rock results in the contamination of surface and ground waters. The Tubarão, Urussanga, and Araranguá Rivers in the state of Santa Catarina comprise the state's coal basin. There are 134 strip mine sites, 115 waste deposit areas, 77 sites with acidic pools, and hundreds of mines, which receive the majority of the waste generated. Coal drainage from each of these locations is responsible for high levels of water contamination. The resulting acidic streams affect local vegetation and prevent re-vegetation of affected areas.

Polluted water sources also means that the plants and sediments within them are contaminated. Organisms that feed off of these elements as well as terrestrial animals that are higher up in the food chain may accumulate toxic levels in their tissues. Open mines may fill with water and become lakes, and the toxic levels of heavy metals are thus transmitted to animals that drink and eat from the water source. Accumulation of these elements may also destroy the physical habitat by encrusting streambeds and aquatic plants.

Soil degradation is another concern. Coal mining changes the morphology of the land and requires deforestation and vegetation removal. This, combined with improper waste disposal, increased erosion and instability of river and stream slopes, and the opening of caves, is responsible for soil degradation. In addition, thousands of hectares of land are now infertile and unusable for agriculture and other farming activities.

Improper management of chemicals used in the mining process has led to incidents of spontaneous combustion leading to air pollution. The extraction and transportation of coal also causes atmospheric pollution. Coal fires from poor mining practices release fly ash, greenhouse gases, and toxic chemicals into the atmosphere, the results of which may be long-lasting considering that these fires may burn for decades. Mining also releases coalmine methane, a greenhouse gas twenty times more powerful than carbon dioxide.

=== Impact on humans ===
Coal mining activity has a negative impact on the health of both workers and the people in communities close to the mines. Chronic inhalation of coal dust has been linked to increased incidents of oxidative stress conditions that may result in lung damage; potentially toxic accumulation of metals in body tissues; diseases like pneumoconiosis (black lung disease), bronchitis, emphysema, fibrosis, and cancer; generation of proinflammatory factors; premature aging; prooxidant and antioxidant alterations that lead to cellular damage; cardiopulmonary disease; hypertension; skin lesions; and other lung and kidney diseases. Coal fires emit toxic levels of arsenic, fluorine, mercury, and selenium, which enter the local food chain via contamination of the air and water supplies. High concentrations of various trace elements like copper, uranium, nickel, and arsenic have been found in local water supplies, which could lead to serious health effects for people in the area.

In the city of Lauro Müller in the state of Santa Catarina, studies indicate that respiratory diseases are responsible for an estimated thirty percent of medical procedures, and four percent were related to various forms of cancer. A high incidence rate of metal-related cancer has been found among coal mine workers.

Subsidence is another problem posed by coal extraction. The “pillar” extraction mode was used until the 1990s. This method leaves behind pillars of coal to support the root of the mine. The mined-out areas frequently cave in, however, which may cause the foundations of houses above the mines to crack and leave fractures, and therefore render useless, areas often used for plowing.

Coal mining also has a number of social and cultural impacts on the communities in the surrounding area. Societies and cultures have been displaced, which has resulted in the loss of traditional practices and other forms of cultural capital. Contaminated air and water supplies forces many to migrate to avoid the health consequences. The extraction of the coal through the pillar method often results in mine collapses, which are responsible for the deaths and injuries of hundreds of workers every year. Closure of a mining site results in job loss, which could in turn lead to immigration searching for new job opportunities, which can contribute to cultural disturbance, and social instability. Local economies are also affected. Wealth disparities result due to the lack of income in these single resource dependent regions. Coal-related activities impact the quality of land and water in surrounding areas, compromising large portions of needed land such as that in the watershed basin in southern Santa Catarina State. Thousands of families in the communities of the coastal ecosystem of the Laguna area depend on fisheries and other oceanic resources, but the marine ecosystem has been degraded by mining and other industrial activities.

The storage of waste materials near urban and suburban areas may also cause problems for nearby populations, including bad odors, property devaluation, loss of crops, loss of land for recreation and leisure, and health related expenses.

== Government ==
The Brazilian government has historically implemented legislation to address the environmental concerns related to coal mining activities. In 1980, for example, the Santa Catarina Coal Region was designated a “Critical National Area for Pollution Control and Environmental Conservation,” an early indication of effort on behalf of the government to recognize the problems in the region. The Federal Attorney General filed suit against the federal and state governments and coal companies in 1993, demanding the termination of environmental degradation by the active mines in the region and the environmental recovery of affected areas.

Legal framework also exists to pressure companies to assume responsibility for the environmental impacts of coal industry activities. The National Environmental Act of 1981 allowed for the creation of several government organizations in charge of evaluating the impact of practices potentially harmful to the environment and local communities. It allowed each state and municipality to establish its own environmental regulation system. It also introduced the idea of environmental impact assessment into Brazilian environmental legislation. As of 1988, the Brazilian Constitution has obliged mining companies “to reclaim the degraded environment, in accordance with the technical solution demanded by the competent public organization” by repairing environmental damages caused by their activity. They are required to maintain water quality within legal limits and are bound by these requirements even after the closure of the mine. The federal court has taken action to uphold this provision. In 2000, a federal judge in Criciúma, Santa Catarina, ordered the establishment of a three-year recovery project by government-run companies that encompasses damages caused by coal mining activities in the state's entire coal region. The Supreme Federal Court condemned mining companies and the federal government for not abiding by these obligations and demanded that they take action. The remediation costs can total $20,000 to $40,000 per hectare according to the levels of degradation and intentions for future use. A technical advisory board was created in 2006 to assist the federal court in addressing reclamation actions based on environmental indicators.

== Future ==
Coal mining's environmental and social impacts highlight the need for responsible practices and ongoing research into more sustainable alternatives. For example, mining companies like Companhia Vale do Rio Doce (CVRD), Brazil's largest mining company, have invested large amounts of capital in clean technology. The company has also accepted a higher degree of social responsibility in the regions where its mines are located. Better working conditions, more proficient production, a healthier environment, an increased market value, a strong global reputation, and appreciation on behalf of the affected communities have all resulted from the company's actions.

Additional solutions have been suggested to address these concerns. Because political and civil organizations at different government levels have influenced the Brazilian mining industry, the development of a sustainable mining region would require a multifaceted approach to address the social, political, and economic concerns of the international community. The Brazilian government (at the national, regional, municipal, and local levels), the mining companies, and the local communities. Long-term planning to include post-mine community development would also help ensure more sustainable practices. Reclamation projects on behalf of joint efforts between the government and mining companies have included surface and groundwater analyses and geological, hydrogeological, and structural mapping. About 818 abandoned mines have been mapped, and other pollution sources are being identified. The diversification of local economies to include non-coal related industries such as ceramics and agriculture has proven successful in regions like the Araranguá watershed. Improved mitigation procedures like confinement, dry covers, and vegetation have been found to significantly reduce the amount of pollution released from these sites.

Selective spoil site management has proven to be one of the most successful measures to protect surface and groundwater supplies from contamination, and may be a valid practice to apply in the future construction of dump sites. The improvement of drainage system quality through this procedure can also significantly reduce the cost of purification treatment prior to discharge into the receiving catchment zones. The residue released during the waste removal process could be further processed and recycled, or it could be sent to safe disposal sites that would not risk human health in the communities surrounding the site.

Coal projects are being developed using the ECOPLEX concept. This means that the projects use the by-products from one industry as raw material for other industries. This results in lower production costs, less energy consumption, and a decreased impact on local communities and the environment. The projects related to the Brazilian coal industry would recycle the waste for use in Brazil's growing hydrothermal industry.

Procedures to reclaim abandoned mining sites have also been proposed. Using the coal pit as a landfill for other waste would help limit the areas impacted by mining activity. Using the area for forest and grassland development could help restore the ecosystems damaged by deforestation and contamination. Developing grassland areas and constructing ponds could help stimulate other forms of local economic ability like cattle raising and fishing. Given the extreme degradation caused by mining activities and the tremendous costs of reclaiming affected land and water areas, these measures face challenges in their successful implementation.

Other measures such as the restriction of truck traffic at night, the watering of roads to reduce dust formation, and the covering of trucks to prevent spilling have also been implemented by mining companies. These have not proven to be sufficient in providing any substantial change, but they should not be dismissed as viable environmental protection measures.
