= Verê =

Coordinates: 25.8808°S 52.9078°W

- Municipality
- Flag Coat of arms
- Interactive map of Verê
- Country: Brazil
- Region: Southern
- State: Paraná
- Mesoregion: Sudoeste Paranaense

Population (2020)
  - Total: 7,174
- Time zone: UTC−3 (BRT)

Verê is a municipality in the state of Paraná in the Southern Region of Brazil.

== See also ==
- List of municipalities in Paraná
