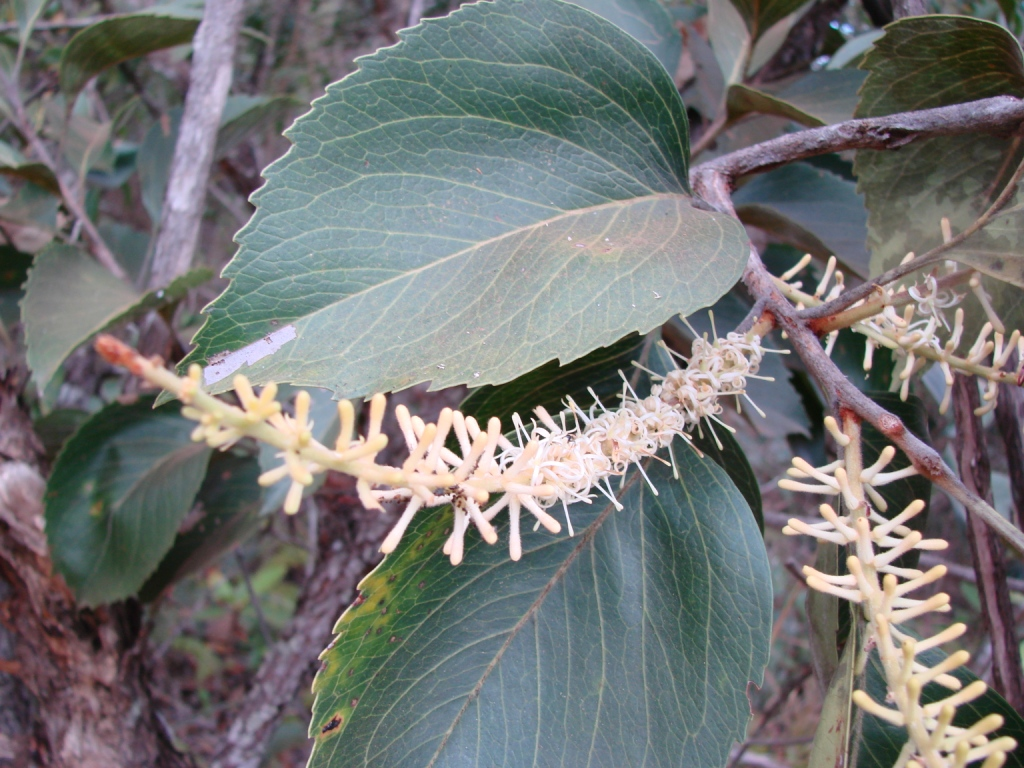

Scientific classification
- Kingdom: Plantae
- Clade: Tracheophytes
- Clade: Angiosperms
- Clade: Eudicots
- Order: Proteales
- Family: Proteaceae
- Genus: Roupala
- Species: R. brasiliensis

Binomial name
- Roupala brasiliensis Klotzsch

= Roupala brasiliensis =

Species of plant native to Brazil and Argentina

Roupala brasiliensis is a species of plant in the family Proteaceae native to Brazil and Argentina.
