= Pinhalão =

Coordinates: 23°47′S 50°03′W

- Municipality
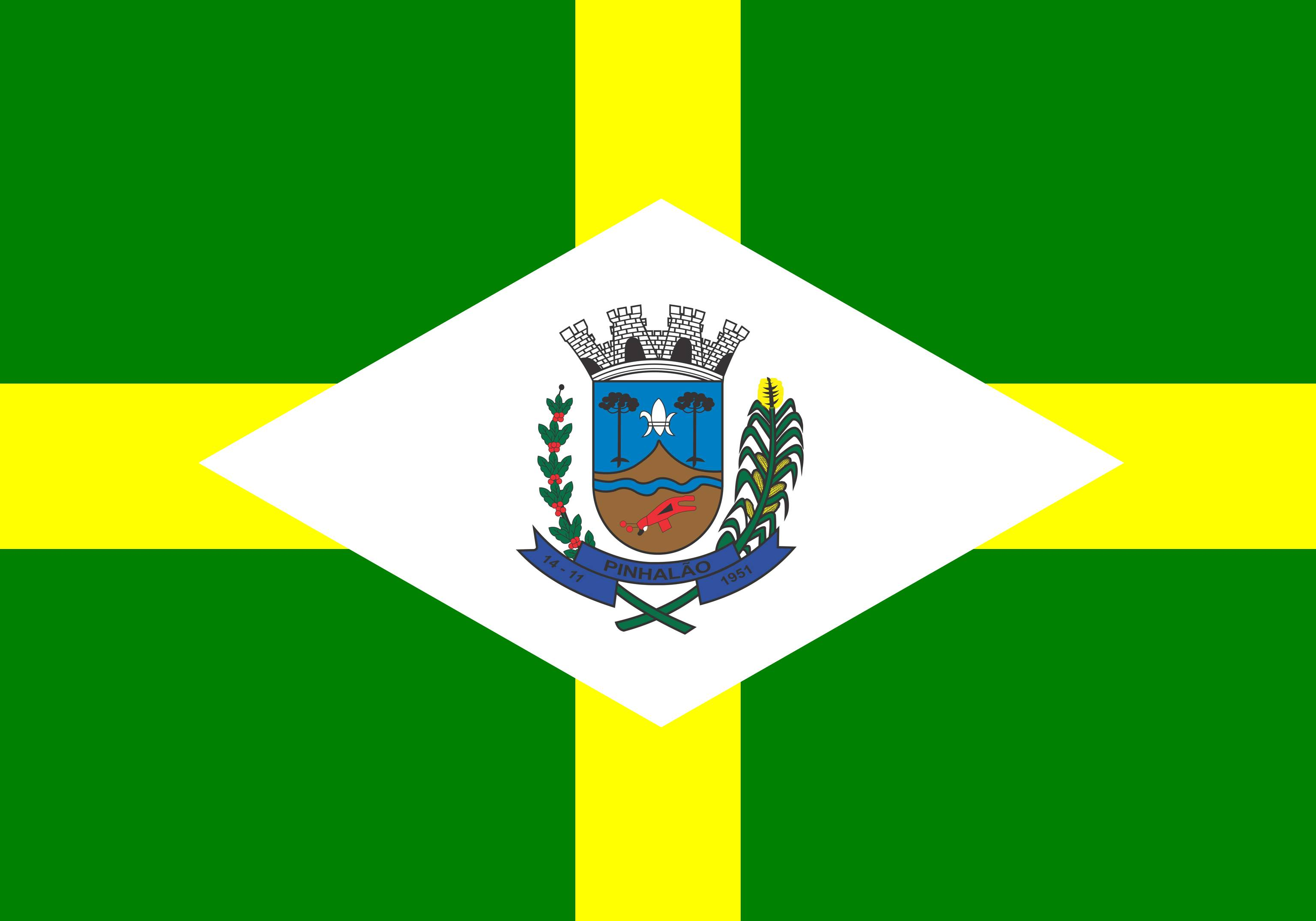
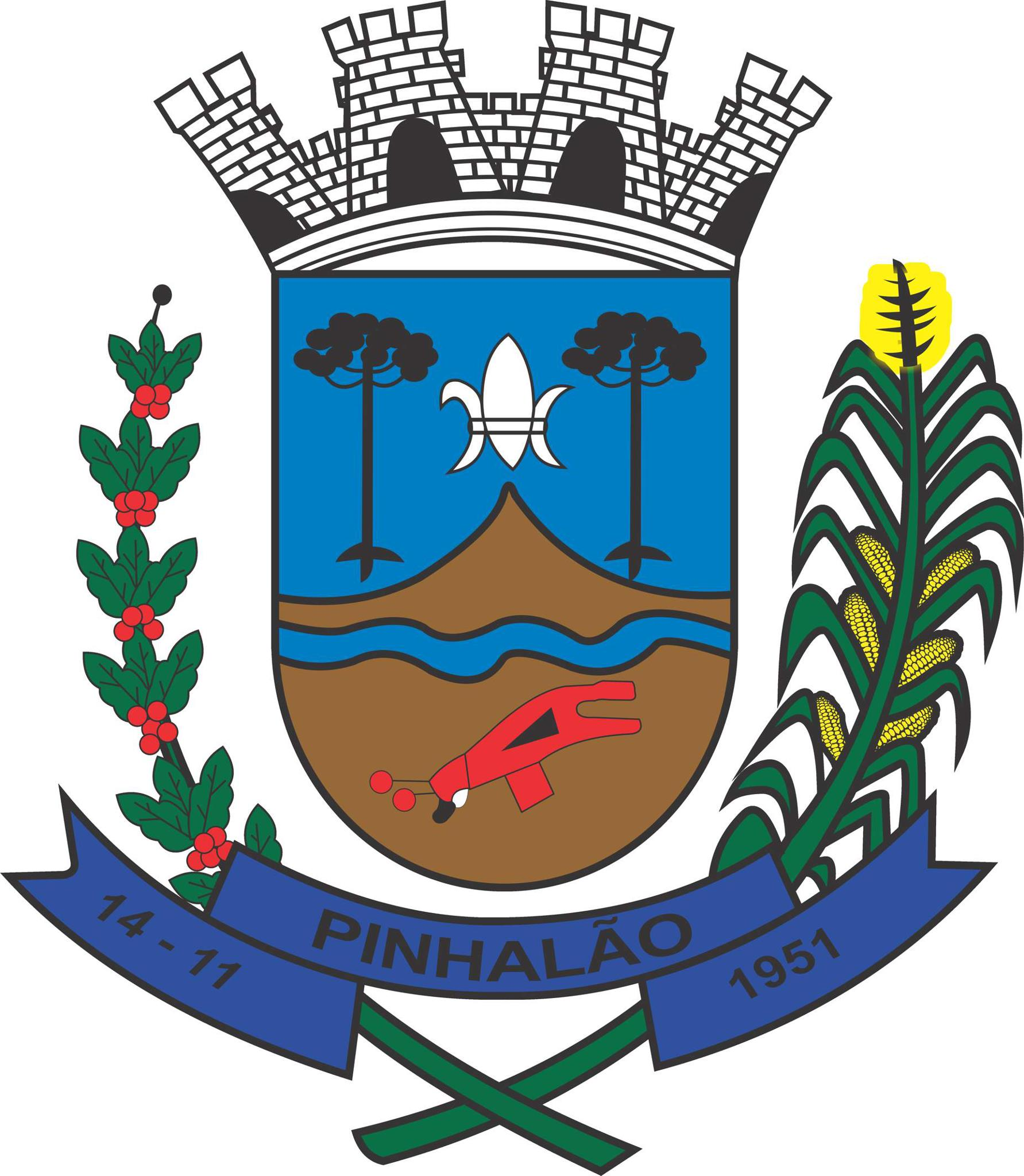
- Flag Coat of arms
- Interactive map of Pinhalão
- Country: Brazil
- Region: Southern
- State: Paraná
- Mesoregion: Norte Pioneiro Paranaense
- Elevation: 1,972 ft (601 m)

Population (2020)
  - Total: 6,324
  - Density: 73/sq mi (28.1/km^{2})
- Time zone: UTC−3 (BRT)

Pinhalão is a municipality in the state of Paraná in the Southern Region of Brazil.

== See also ==
- List of municipalities in Paraná
