= Das Cinzas River =

River in Brazil

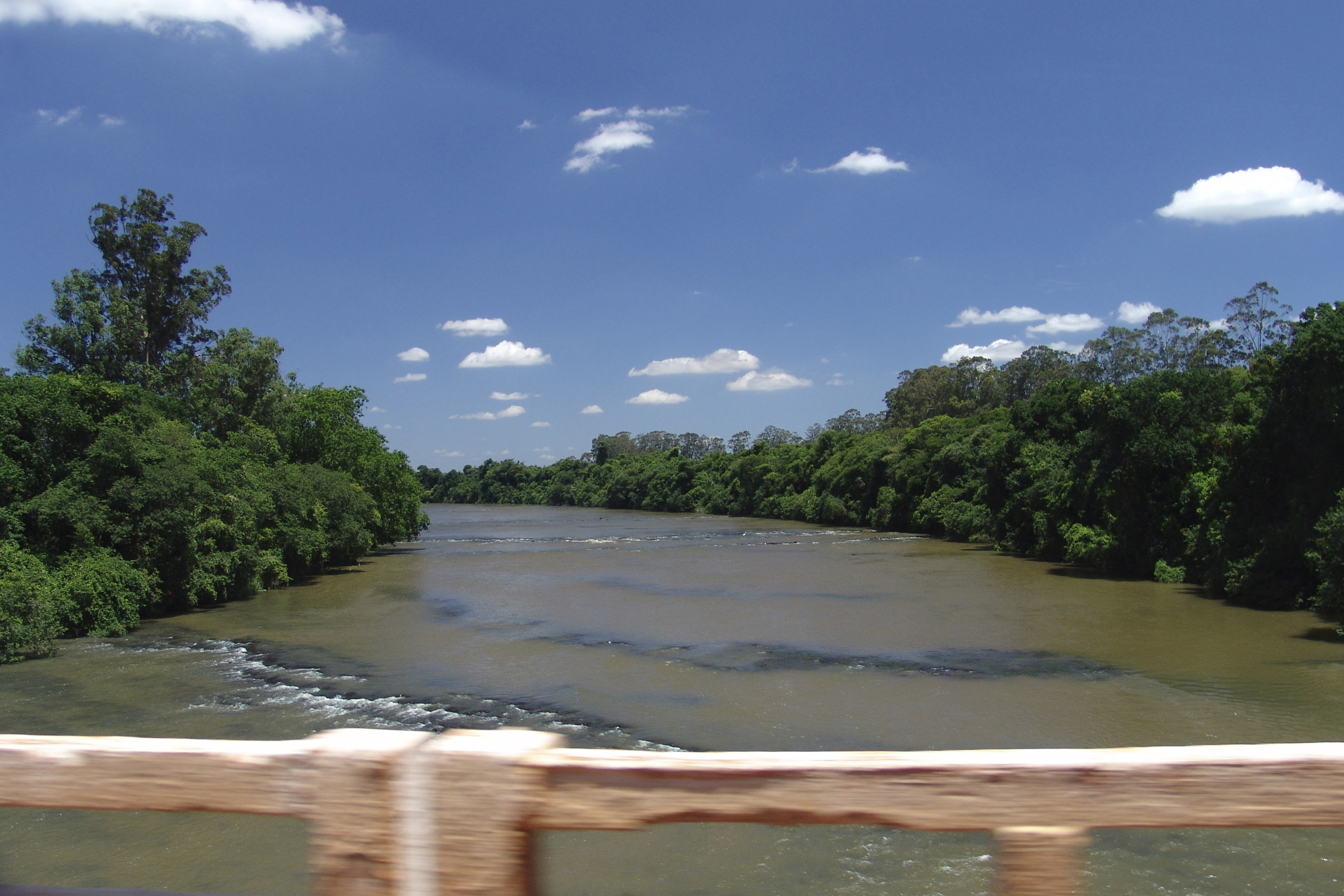

Location
- Country: Brazil

Physical characteristics
- Source
  - location: Paraná state
- Mouth: Paranapanema River
  - coordinates: 22°56′S 50°32′W

The Das Cinzas River is a river of Paraná state in southern Brazil.

== See also ==
- List of rivers of Paraná
