= Bocaiúva do Sul =

Coordinates: 25°11′S 49°08′W

- Municipality
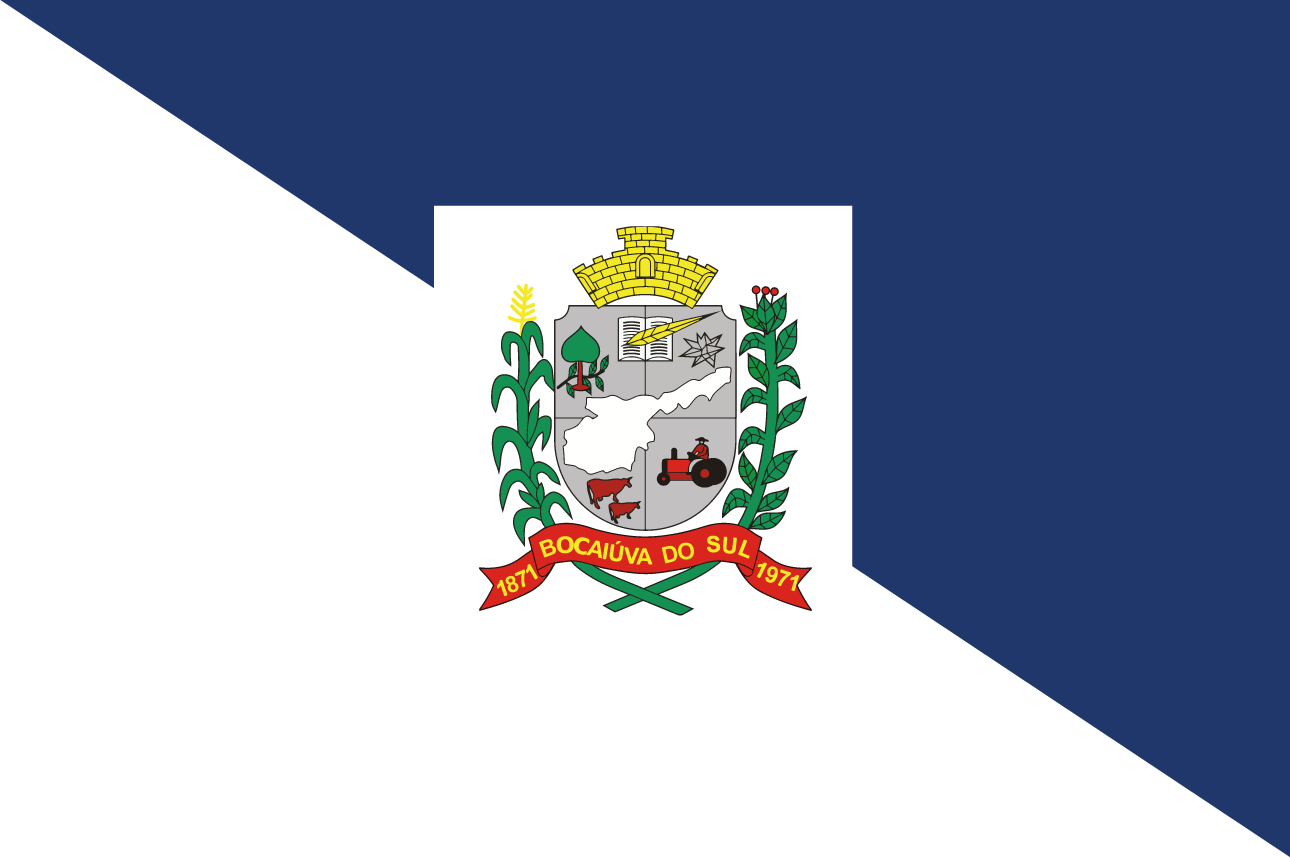
- Flag Coat of arms
- Interactive map of Bocaiúva do Sul
- Country: Brazil
- Region: Southern
- State: Paraná
- Mesoregion: Metropolitana de Curitiba

Population (2020)
  - Total: 13,129
- Time zone: UTC−3 (BRT)

Bocaiúva do Sul is a municipality in the state of Paraná in the Southern Region of Brazil.

== See also ==
- List of municipalities in Paraná
