= Tomazina =

Coordinates: 23°46′S 49°58′W

- Municipality
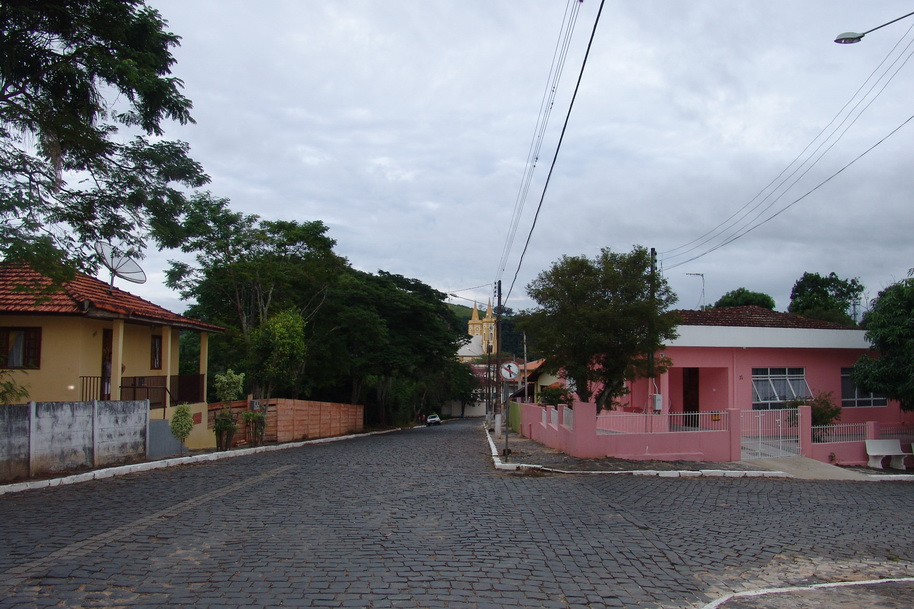

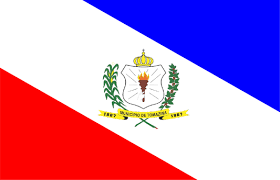
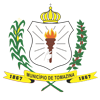
- Flag Coat of arms
- Interactive map of Tomazina
- Country: Brazil
- Region: Southern
- State: Paraná
- Mesoregion: Norte Pioneiro Paranaense

Population (2020)
  - Total: 7,807
- Time zone: UTC−3 (BRT)

Tomazina is a municipality in the state of Paraná in the Southern Region of Brazil.

== See also ==
- List of municipalities in Paraná
