= Curiúva =

- Municipality
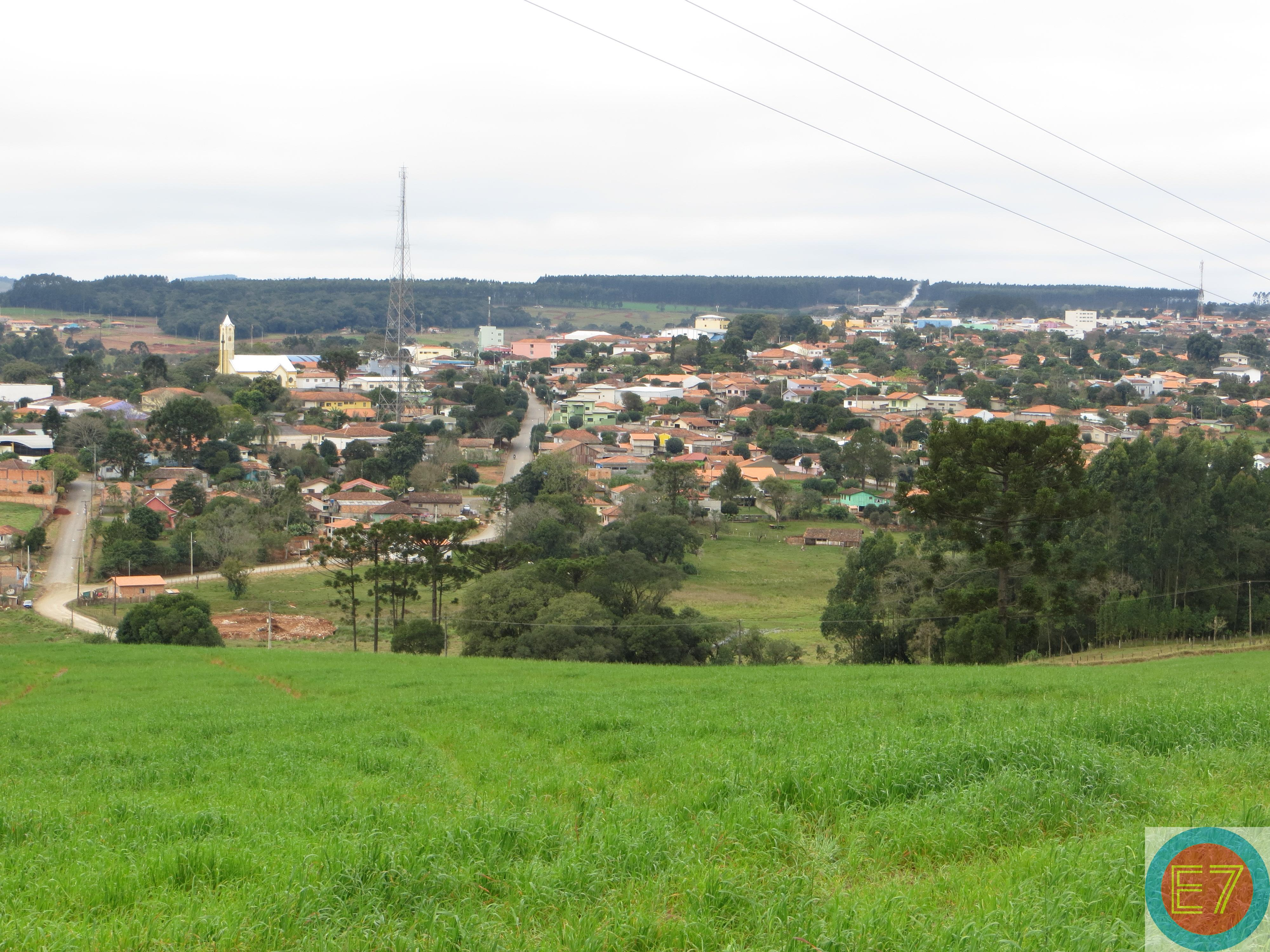
- Partial view of the city

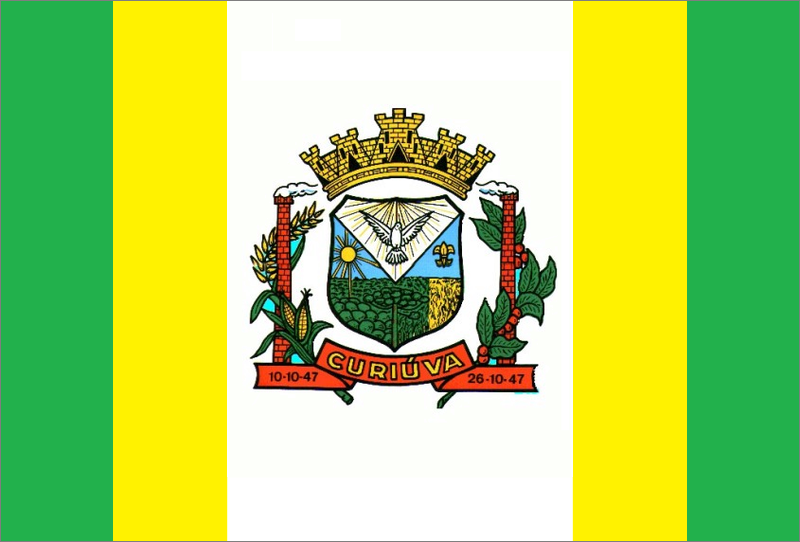
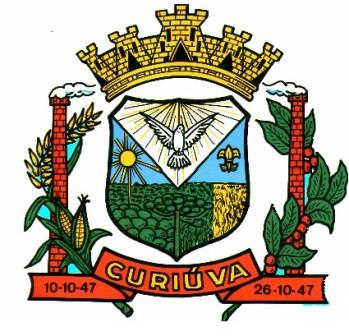
- Flag Coat of arms

- Location of Curiúva in Paraná

- Location in Brazil
- Coordinates: 24°01′58″S 50°27′28″W
- Country: Brazil
- Region: South
- State: Paraná
- Mesoregion: Norte Pioneiro Paranaense
- Neighboring municipalities: Sapopema, Figueira, Ibaiti, Ventania, Telêmaco Borba, and Ortigueira
- Distance to capital: 287 km (178 mi)
- Founded: 10 October 1947; 78 years ago

Government
  - Mayor: Christiano Giunta Borges (PSD)
  - Term ends: 2028

Area
  - Total: 576.263 km^{2} (222.496 sq mi)
- Elevation: 776 m (2,546 ft)

Population (IBGE/2018 estimate)
  - Total: 13,647
  - Density: 23.682/km^{2} (61.336/sq mi)
- Demonym: Curiuvense
- Time zone: UTC−3 (BRT)
- Climate: Humid subtropical (Cfa)
- HDI (UNDP/2010): 0.656
- GDP (IBGE/2012): R$152,981,000
- GDP per capita (IBGE/2012): R$10,867.46
- Website: http://www.curiuva.pr.gov.br/

Curiúva is a Brazilian municipality located in the interior of the state of Paraná. It belongs to the Intermediate Geographic Region of Ponta Grossa and the Immediate Geographic Region of Telêmaco Borba and is situated northwest of the state capital, approximately 287 km (178 mi) away. It covers an area of 576.263 km^{2} (222.496 sq mi), of which 2,085.9 m^{2} (22,452 sq ft) are in the urban area. According to 2018 IBGE estimates, its population was 15,003 inhabitants.

The municipal seat has an average annual temperature of 19.1 °C (66.4 °F), and the predominant vegetation in the municipality is the mixed ombrophilous forest. With 68.77% of its residents living in the urban area, the municipality had nine healthcare facilities in 2009. Its Human Development Index (HDI) is 0.675, which is considered to be in the medium range compared to the state average.

The territory where Curiúva is located began to be colonized around 1947. The original name of Curiúva was Caetê, and its earliest inhabitants were the Kaingang people. Founded through State Law No. 2 on October 10, 1947, and officially established on October 26 of the same year, it was emancipated from São Jerônimo da Serra. Today, the main economic activities in Curiúva are agriculture and service provision.

== History ==
=== Origins ===
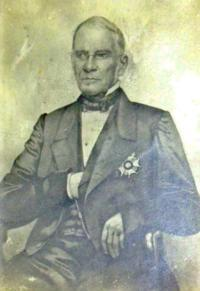
Baron of Antonina.

The explorations that took place in the mid-19th century, aimed at forging paths into the interior along the Tibagi and Paranapanema rivers, are the earliest historical records of what is now the municipality of Curiúva. At that time, at the request of the Baron of Antonina, the explorer Joaquim Francisco Lopes ventured into the tropical forest, crossing the Facão and Caeté ranges. The old trail, connecting the Campos Gerais to the then Jataí Military Colony, evolved into a highway due to the constant movement of numerous troops in the opposite direction.

The first residents of the area were Fortunato Rodrigues Jardim and Antônio Cunha, who owned vast tracts of land in the region. Many travelers passing through the small settlement that formed grew fond of the place and stayed, beginning to establish a new way of life in a land of warm climate and fertile soil.

There were no doctors in the settlement, and diseases, many transmitted by animals, were a constant issue. Healing was done solely through folk healing and blessings, with doctors or medicine traders visiting only occasionally, arriving on horseback. In 1912, a police district was established, and on November 1, 1913, the area received its first visit from a priest. In 1922, João Antônio Desidério de Oliveira was appointed as the official postman.

=== Administrative formation and etymology ===
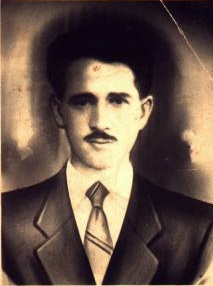
Joaquim Carneiro, the first elected mayor of Curiúva from 1947 to 1948.

The original name of Curiúva was Caetê, referencing the range of the same name, which in the Guarani language means "virgin forest." Under this name, the settlement was elevated to the status of a Police District in 1912 by Paraná State Decree-Law No. 985, belonging to the municipality of São Jerônimo da Serra. By Paraná State Decree-Law No. 199 of December 30, 1943, amended by Decree-Law No. 311 of February 26, 1945, the Caetê District began to form the municipalities of Araiporanga (São Jerônimo) and Congonhinhas. From then on, the district was renamed Curiúva.

On October 10, 1947, through Paraná State Law No. 2, approved by the then governor of Paraná, Moysés Lupion de Tróia, the municipality of Curiúva was founded and officially established on October 26 of the same year. On the same day, Luíz Lemos took office as the first appointed mayor. The first elected mayor in 1947 was Joaquim Carneiro, a businessman, ceramist, and pharmacist. However, his term was short-lived, ending the following year, as he took his own life, overwhelmed by insurmountable issues in the cooperative he founded. In 1951, the Sapopema District was created, which was emancipated from Curiúva in 1960 to become a municipality. In 1983, Curiúva lost another portion of its territory to form the municipality of Figueira. Today, Alecrim is the only Administrative District.

The name Curiúva comes from the Guarani language and refers to a variety of pine tree, which was abundant in the region during the time of settlement. The term “curi” means “pine cone” or “pine nut,” and “uva” means “tree.” Thus, the city’s name can be interpreted as “pine wood” or “pine tree.”

== Geography ==
According to the Brazilian Institute of Geography and Statistics, the municipality’s area is 576.261 km^{2} (222.496 sq mi), with 2.0859 km^{2} (0.8054 sq mi) in the urban area and the remaining 574.175 km^{2} (221.690 sq mi) in the rural area. It is located at 24°01′58″S 50°27′28″W and is 195 km (121 mi) west of the state capital. It borders Sapopema, Figueira, and Ibaiti to the north; Ortigueira to the west; Telêmaco Borba to the south; and Ibaiti and Ventania to the east.

According to the regional division in effect since 2017, established by the IBGE, the municipality belongs to the Intermediate Geographic Region of Ponta Grossa and the Immediate Geographic Region of Telêmaco Borba. Previously, under the division into microregions and mesoregions, it was part of the Ibaiti microregion, which was included in the Norte Pioneiro Paranaense mesoregion.

=== Geomorphology and hydrography ===
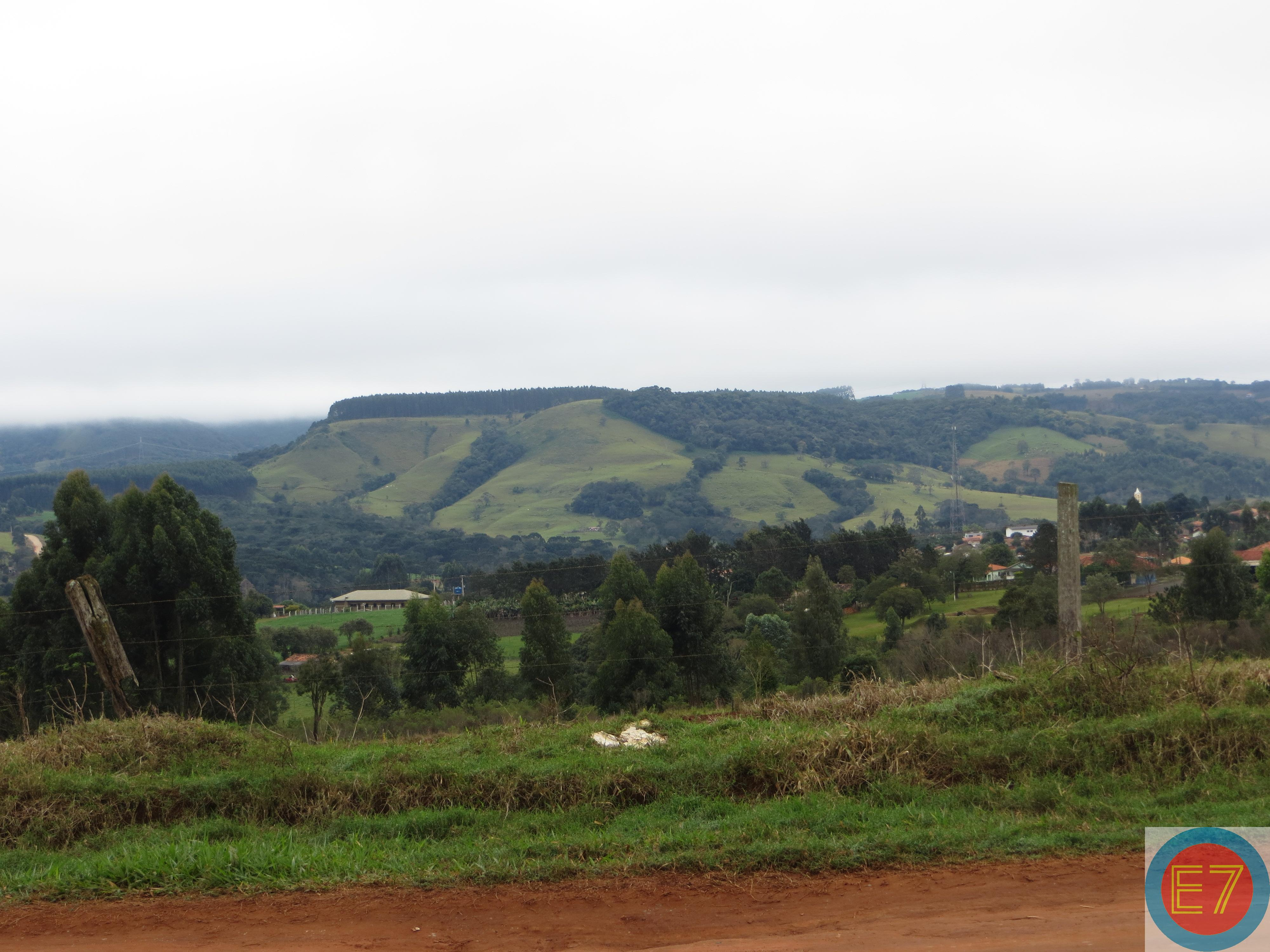
The Serra do Caeté is the highest point in the municipality.

Geologically, the municipality’s terrain is of Permo-Carboniferous, Permian, and Paleozoic-Permian origin. The soils in the municipality include red-yellow acrisol, latosol, lithic neosol, and haplic cambisol, predominantly with a sandy texture. The municipal seat is at an elevation of 776 m (2,546 ft). The municipality’s terrain is quite undulating and almost mountainous, with elevations ranging between 500 and 900 m (1,600 and 3,000 ft). Curiúva is located in the Second Paranaense Plateau. The maximum elevation is approximately 977 m (3,205 ft) at Serra do Caeté, and the minimum is 510 m (1,670 ft) at the Tibagi River.

Curiúva is part of the hydrographic basins of the Tibagi and Das Cinzas rivers. The main rivers that flow through the municipality are not navigable, including the Laranjinha, Lajeado, and Das Antas, except for the Tibagi, which originates in Campos Gerais.

=== Climate ===
According to the IBGE, Curiúva’s climate is classified as humid subtropical (type Cfa according to the Köppen classification), with an average annual temperature of 19.1 °C (66.4 °F), mild temperatures, and constant rainfall throughout the year. The warmest month, January, has an average temperature of 22.5 °C (72.5 °F), with a maximum of 27.7 °C (81.9 °F) and a minimum of 17.3 °C (63.1 °F). The coldest month, June, averages 15.1 °C (59.2 °F), with a maximum of 21.1 °C (70.0 °F) and a minimum of 9.1 °C (48.4 °F). Autumn and spring are transitional seasons.

The average annual precipitation is 1,442.9 mm (56.81 in), with August being the driest month, receiving 61.4 mm (2.42 in). January, the wettest month, averages 209.0 mm (8.23 in). In recent years, however, hot and dry days during winter have become more frequent, often exceeding 30 °C (86 °F), especially between July and September. For example, on August 30, 1994, thermometers reached nearly 36 °C (97 °F) in the middle of winter. According to the SIMEPAR Technological Institute, the highest recorded temperature was on November 17, 1975, when some areas reached 41.1 °C (106.0 °F). The lowest recorded temperature was on July 18, 1975, with an average of −3.7 °C (25.3 °F).

Climate data for Curiúva
Month	Jan	Feb	Mar	Apr	May	Jun	Jul	Aug	Sep	Oct	Nov	Dec	Year
Mean daily maximum °C (°F)	27.7 (81.9)	27.6 (81.7)	27.6 (81.7)	25.6 (78.1)	22.7 (72.9)	21.1 (70.0)	21.8 (71.2)	22.9 (73.2)	23.5 (74.3)	25.1 (77.2)	25.7 (78.3)	26.1 (79.0)	24.7 (76.5)
Mean daily minimum °C (°F)	17.3 (63.1)	17.5 (63.5)	16.7 (62.1)	14.1 (57.4)	11.0 (51.8)	9.1 (48.4)	8.9 (48.0)	10.2 (50.4)	11.9 (53.4)	13.7 (56.7)	14.7 (58.5)	16.3 (61.3)	13.4 (56.1)
Average precipitation mm (inches)	209.0 (8.23)	177.8 (7.00)	131.2 (5.17)	89.2 (3.51)	92.6 (3.65)	88.6 (3.49)	71.4 (2.81)	61.4 (2.42)	113.0 (4.45)	140.5 (5.53)	124.9 (4.92)	143.3 (5.64)	1,442.9 (56.81)
Source: Jornal do Tempo

=== Ecology and environment ===
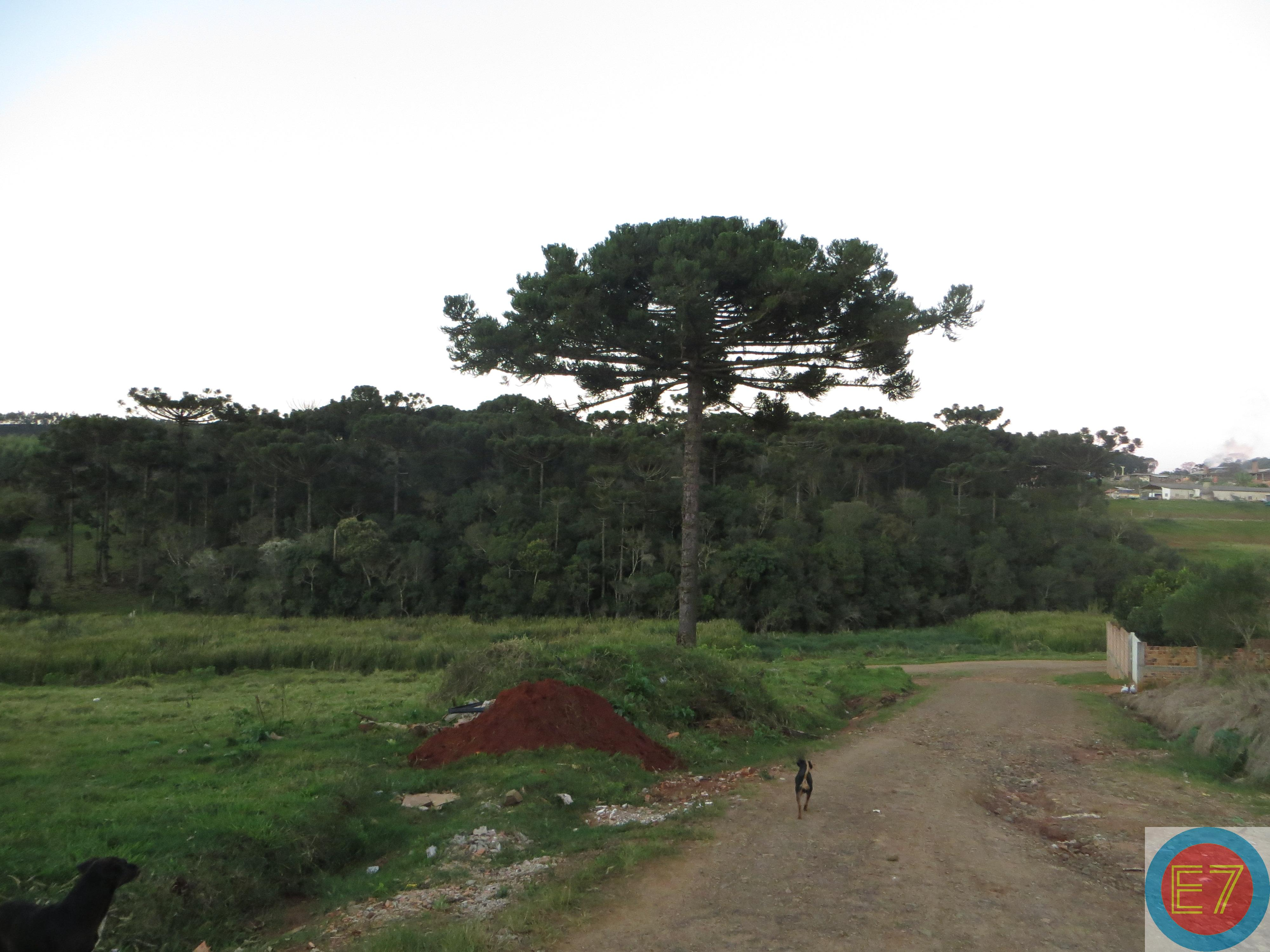
Remnant of Araucaria angustifolia in Curiúva.

At the time of the discovery of Brazil in 1500, the municipality was covered by a single vegetation formation, the mixed ombrophilous forest. Over time, parts of the native forest gave way to the timber industry and the exploitation of aspidosperma spruceanum, pine, and coal, which are the main plant and mineral resources found in the municipality, as well as to agriculture and pastures for the expansion of livestock farming.

Coal has been mined since 1941 by the Cambuí Coal Company (Figueira), and there are traces of uranium, although the presence of permanent preservation areas (APP) now limits which areas can be exploited, even on private property. Non-governmental organizations also contribute to combating illegal deforestation, with projects in the municipality focused on environmental preservation, including native forest restoration, rural property adaptation with technicians and farmers, and environmental education in local schools.

== Demography ==
Historical population
Year	Pop.	±%
1970	17,724	—
1980	19,660	+10.9%
1991	10,503	−46.6%
2000	12,904	+22.9%
2010	13,923	+7.9%
2018 (est.)	15,003	+7.8%
Source: IBGE

In 2010, the municipality’s population was counted by the Brazilian Institute of Geography and Statistics (IBGE) at 13,923 inhabitants. According to the 2010 census, 7,107 inhabitants were male, and 6,816 were female. The same census reported that 9,573 inhabitants lived in the urban area, while 4,350 resided in the rural area. According to 2018 estimates, the municipal population was 15,003. Of the total population in 2010, 3,515 inhabitants (25.25%) were under 15 years old, 9,237 (66.34%) were aged 15 to 64, and 1,171 (8.41%) were over 65, with a life expectancy at birth of 72.7 years and a fertility rate of 2.5 children per woman.

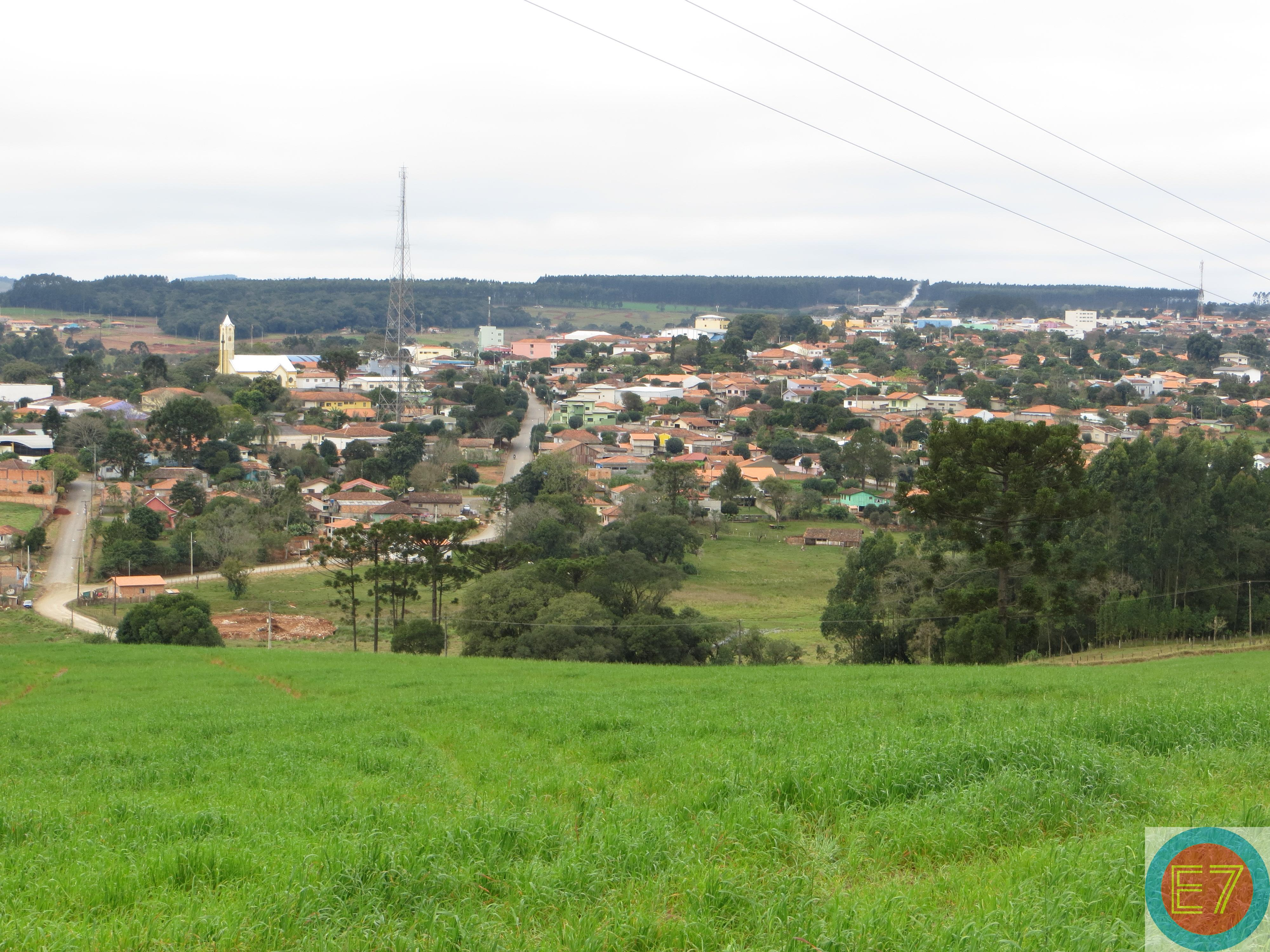
Partial view of the city from the rural area of the municipality.

In 2010, Curiúva’s population consisted of 9,309 whites (66.86%), 630 blacks (4.52%), 116 Asians (0.83%), 3,866 pardos (27.77%), and two indigenous people (0.01%). Regarding region of birth, 12,831 were born in the South (92.16%), 48 in the North (0.34%), 148 in the Northeast (1.06%), 33 in the Central-West (0.24%), and 810 in the Southeast (5.82%). 12,732 inhabitants were natives of Paraná (91.44%), of which 8,403 were born in Curiúva (60.35%). Among the 2,254 natives of other states, São Paulo had the largest presence with 514 people (3.69%), followed by Minas Gerais with 268 residents (1.93%), and Santa Catarina with 63 inhabitants (0.45%). Curiúva has two quilombola communities located in the rural area: Água Morna and Guajuvira.

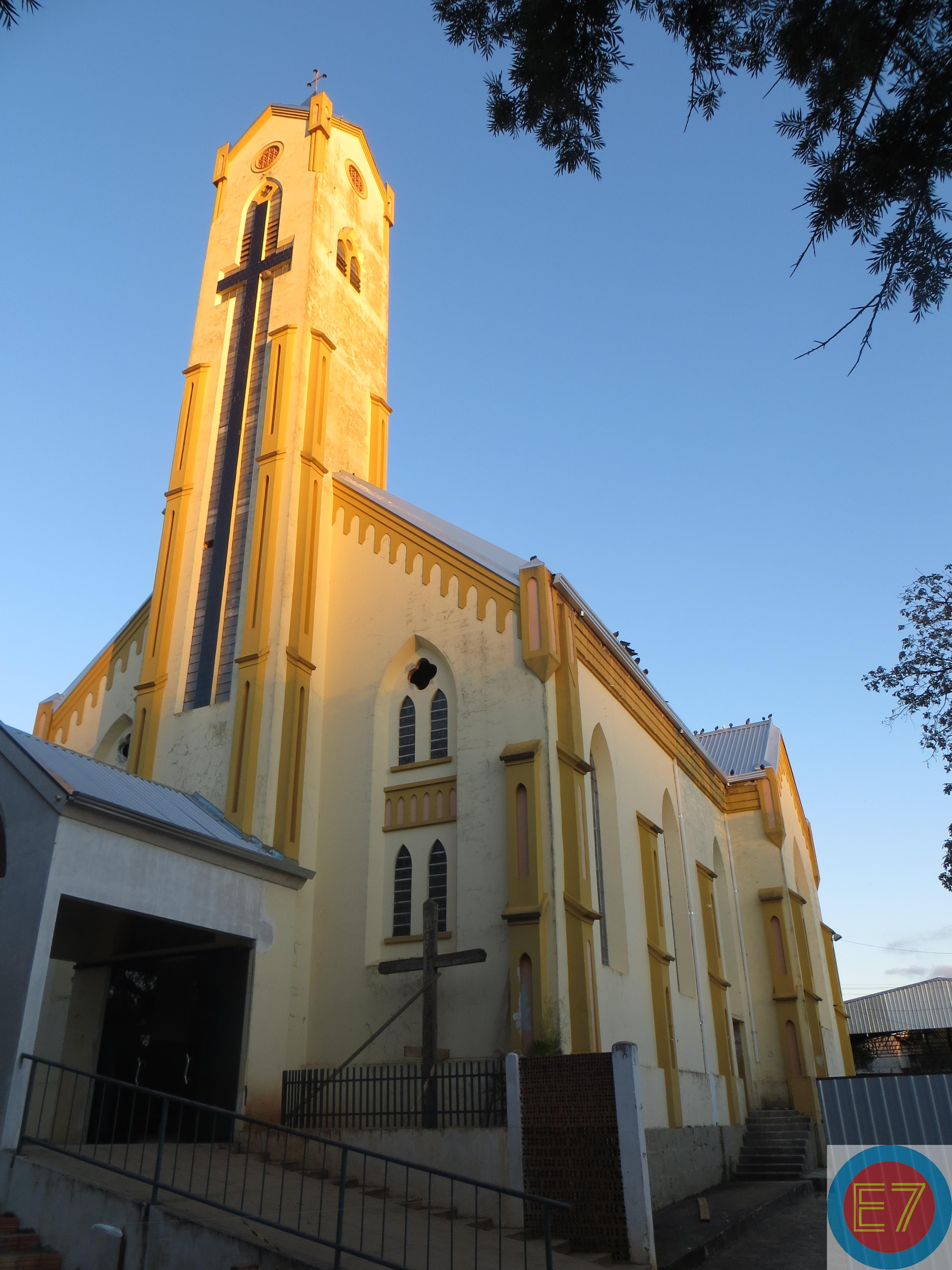
Divine Holy Spirit Parish.

The municipal Human Development Index (HDI-M) of Curiúva is considered medium by the UNDP, with a value of 0.656 (the 2986th highest in Brazil). The city’s indicators are close to the national average according to the UNDP. Considering only the education index, the value is 0.546; longevity is 0.795, and income is 0.649. From 2000 to 2010, the proportion of people with a per capita household income of up to half a minimum wage decreased by 69.1%, and in 2010, 87.2% of the population lived above the poverty line, 8.8% were at the poverty line, and 4.1% were below. The Gini coefficient, which measures social inequality, was 0.450, with 1.00 being the worst and 0.00 the best. The share of the richest 20% of the city’s population in the total municipal income was 50.4%, or 9.7 times higher than the 5.2% share of the poorest 20%.

According to 2010 census data from the IBGE, Curiúva’s population consisted of 10,144 Catholics (72.86%), 3,219 Protestants (23.12%), 421 people without religion (3.02%), 19 Spiritists (0.13%), and 0.87% were divided among other religions. According to the Catholic Church division, the city is home to the Divine Holy Spirit Parish, established as a community on February 14, 1952, and emancipated in 1953, under the Diocese of Cornélio Procópio.

== Politics and administration ==
Municipal administration is carried out by the executive and legislative branches. The representative of the executive power in Curiúva, chosen by the people in the 2024 municipal elections, was Christiano Borges of the Social Democratic Party, who won a total of 3,942 votes (48.55% of the electorate), with Pithi as vice-mayor.

The legislative branch consists of the Municipal Chamber, composed of nine councilors elected for four-year terms (in accordance with Article 29 of the Constitution). It comprises two seats from the PMB, two from the PSC, two from the PTB, two from the PSB, and one from the PP. The chamber is responsible for drafting and voting on fundamental laws for the administration and the executive, particularly the participatory budget (Budget Guidelines Law).

The municipality is part of the Curiúva Judicial District, created by Decree-Law No. 5809 on June 15, 1968, following requests from local and regional authorities and leaders, and officially established on July 15, 1970. It also includes the municipalities of Figueira and Sapopema. There were 11,360 voters in February 2014, representing 0.144% of the total in Paraná.

Politics of Curiúva

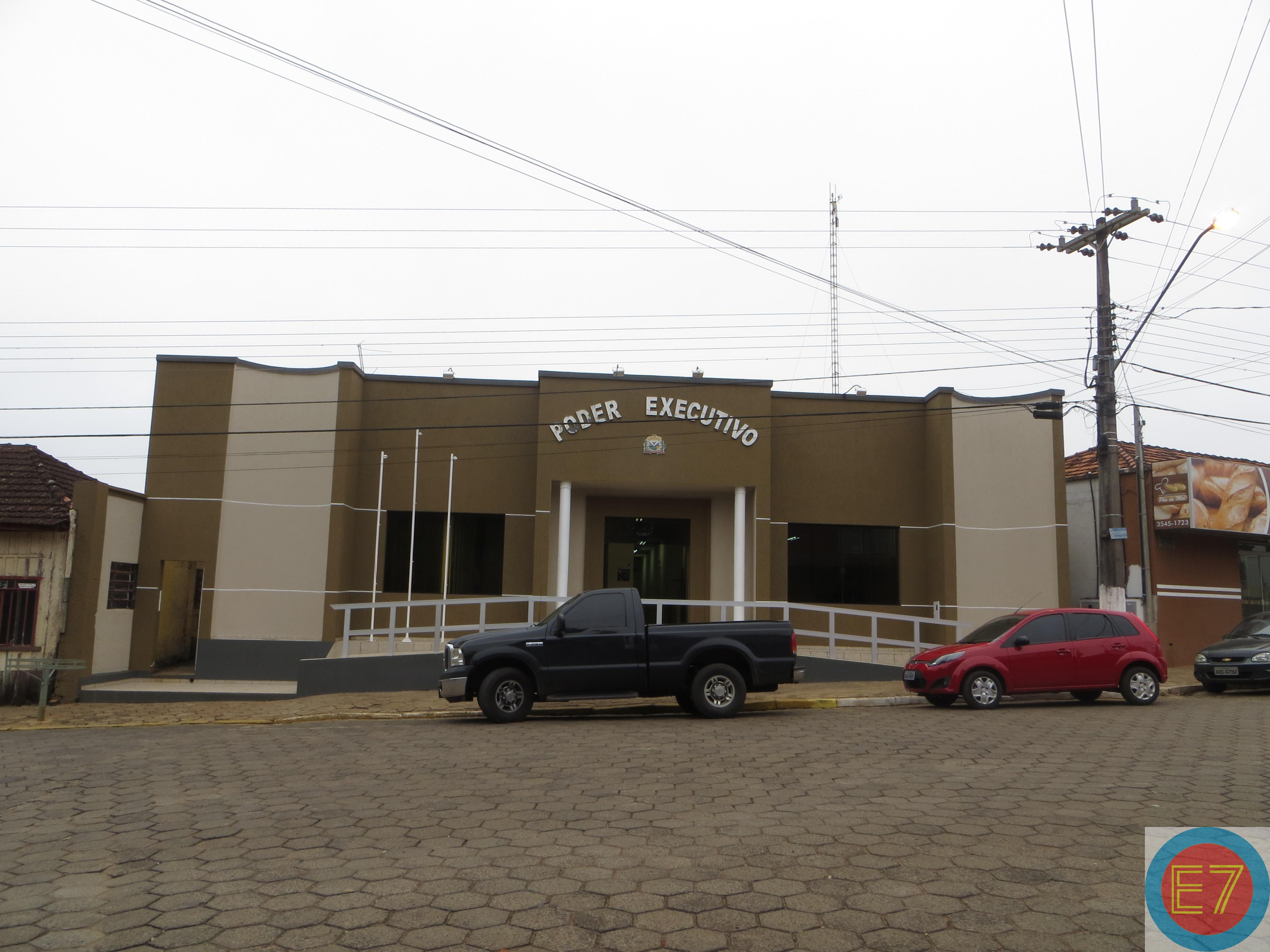
Curiúva City Hall, seat of the municipal executive power.

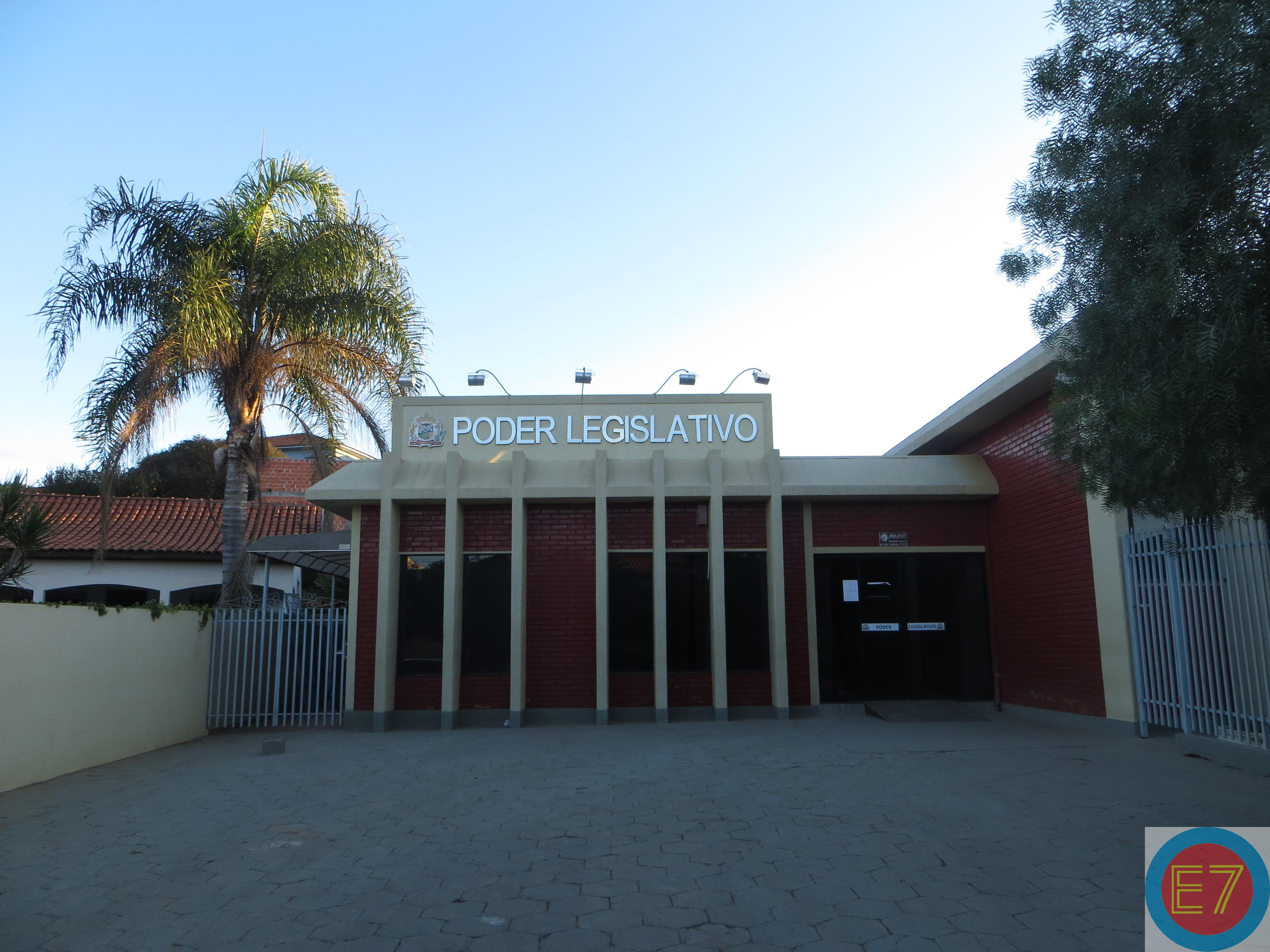
Curiúva City Council, seat of the municipal legislative power.

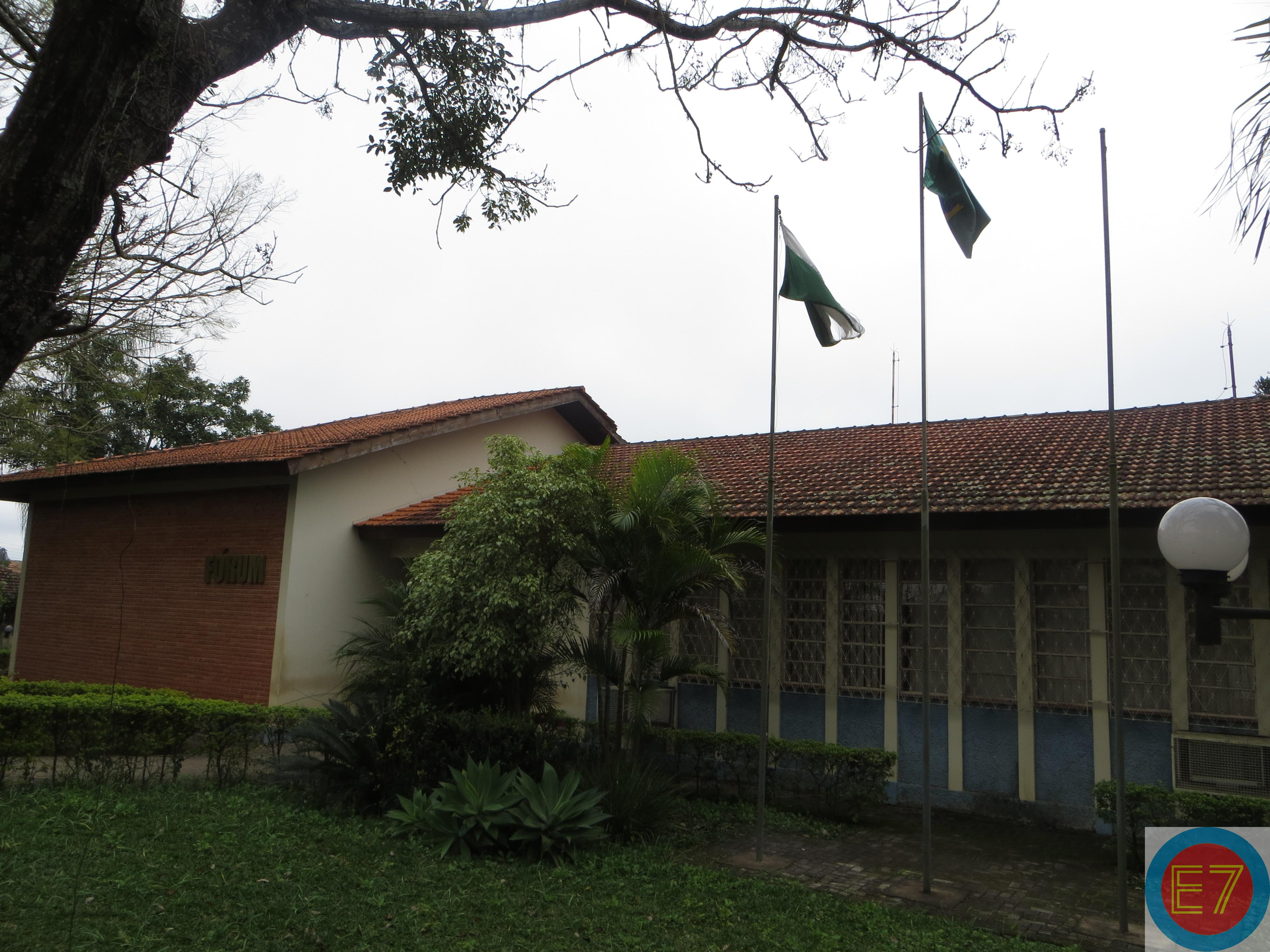
Curiúva District Forum, seat of the municipal judicial power.

=== Symbols ===
The symbols of the municipality of Curiúva are the flag, coat of arms, and anthem. The coat of arms, flag, and anthem were adopted as symbols by Municipal Law No. 595 on December 1, 1994. The coat of arms is a modern French shield, topped with a chief in argent featuring the dove of the Divine Holy Spirit, symbolizing the municipality’s patron saint. On the right flank of the shield is a fleur-de-lis, representing social change and the happiness of the people, and on the left, a stylized sun at its zenith, heralding a future of achievements for all. In the lower field of the shield, agriculture, reforestation, and araucarias symbolize key economic activities of the municipality. As supports, two factory chimneys represent the potential of industrialization, which could make Curiúva one of the most developed municipalities in the region in the near future. Coffee, maize, and rice with their stalks entwined represent the most important agricultural riches of the municipality. Below the shield is a scroll with the inscriptions 10/10/1947 — Curiúva — 26/10/1947, and above it is a crown with five golden towers.

The flag, designed by Professor José Carlos Pereira, consists of a rectangle with the municipal coat of arms in the center and five vertical stripes: vert (at the ends), argent (in the center), and or (between the vert and argent stripes). Its colors are vert for honor, civility, courtesy, joy, abundance, and hope; or for glory, splendor, wealth, grandeur, and leadership; and argent for peace, friendship, work, purity, and religiosity. The anthem of Curiúva was written by Professor José Carlos Pereira, with music composed by the maestro from Minas Gerais, Sebastião Lima, who settled in Paraná.

== Economy ==
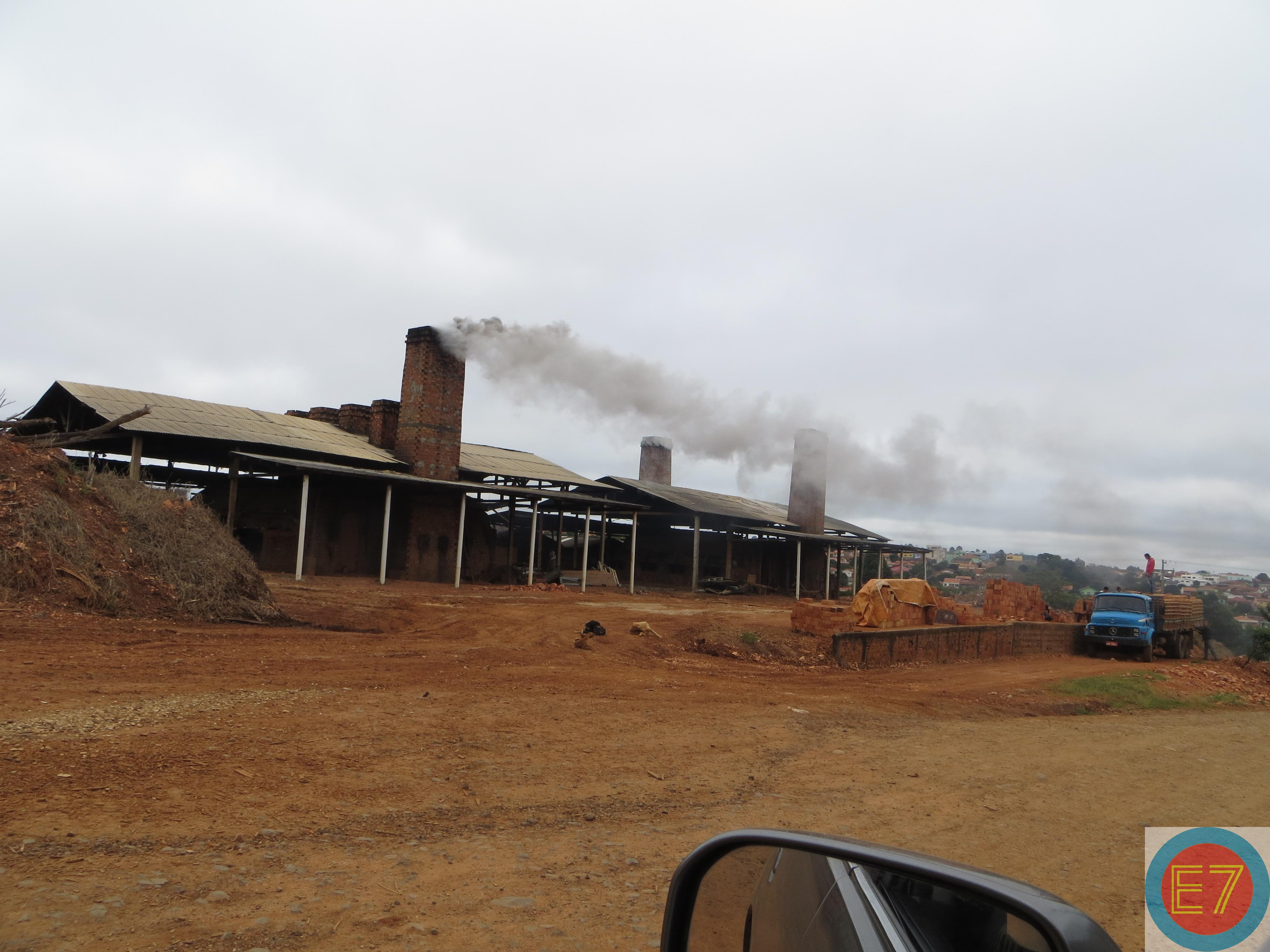
Ceramics industry.

In Curiúva’s Gross Domestic Product (GDP), agribusiness and the service sector stand out. According to 2012 IBGE data, the municipality’s GDP was R$152,981,000. R$6,611,000 came from taxes on products net of subsidies at current prices, and the per capita GDP was R$10,867.46. In 2010, 61.76% of the population over 18 was economically active, while the unemployment rate was 6.04%.

Wages, along with other remuneration, totaled R$24,590,000, and the average monthly wage in the municipality was 1.8 minimum wages. There were 422 local units and 418 active companies. According to the IBGE, 73.76% of households survived on less than one minimum wage per month per resident (3,239 households), 20.22% earned between one and three minimum wages per person (811), 2.10% received between three and five (92), 0.93% had incomes above five (41), and 2.98% had none (131).

Primary sector

Production of maize, soybean, and sugarcane (2013)
Product	Harvested area (hectares)	Production (tons)
Maize	5,000	20,500
Soybean	5,000	17,350
Sugarcane	80	4,000

In 2012, R$53,486,000 of the city’s GDP came from the gross added value of agribusiness, while in 2010, 40.52% of the municipality’s economically active population was employed in this sector. According to the IBGE, in 2013, the municipality had 36,395 cattle, 630 buffalo, 500 goats, 1,160 horses, 1,000 sheep, 9,280 pigs, and 45,780 poultry. 2,250 cows were milked, producing 3,350,000 liters of milk. Additionally, 13,500 kilograms of honey and 31,760 kilograms of silkworm cocoons were produced.

In terms of temporary agriculture, the main crops are maize (20,500 tons produced and 5,000 hectares cultivated), soybean (17,350 tons and 5,000 hectares planted), and sugarcane (4,000 tons and 80 hectares), in addition to garlic, peanut, rice, onion, bean, cassava, watermelon, tomato, and wheat. In terms of permanent crops, coffee (444 tons produced and 308 hectares harvested), orange (300 tons and 20 hectares), and lemon (180 tons and 10 hectares) stand out, with banana, persimmon, papaya, mango, passion fruit, peach, tangerine, and grape also cultivated.

Secondary and tertiary sectors

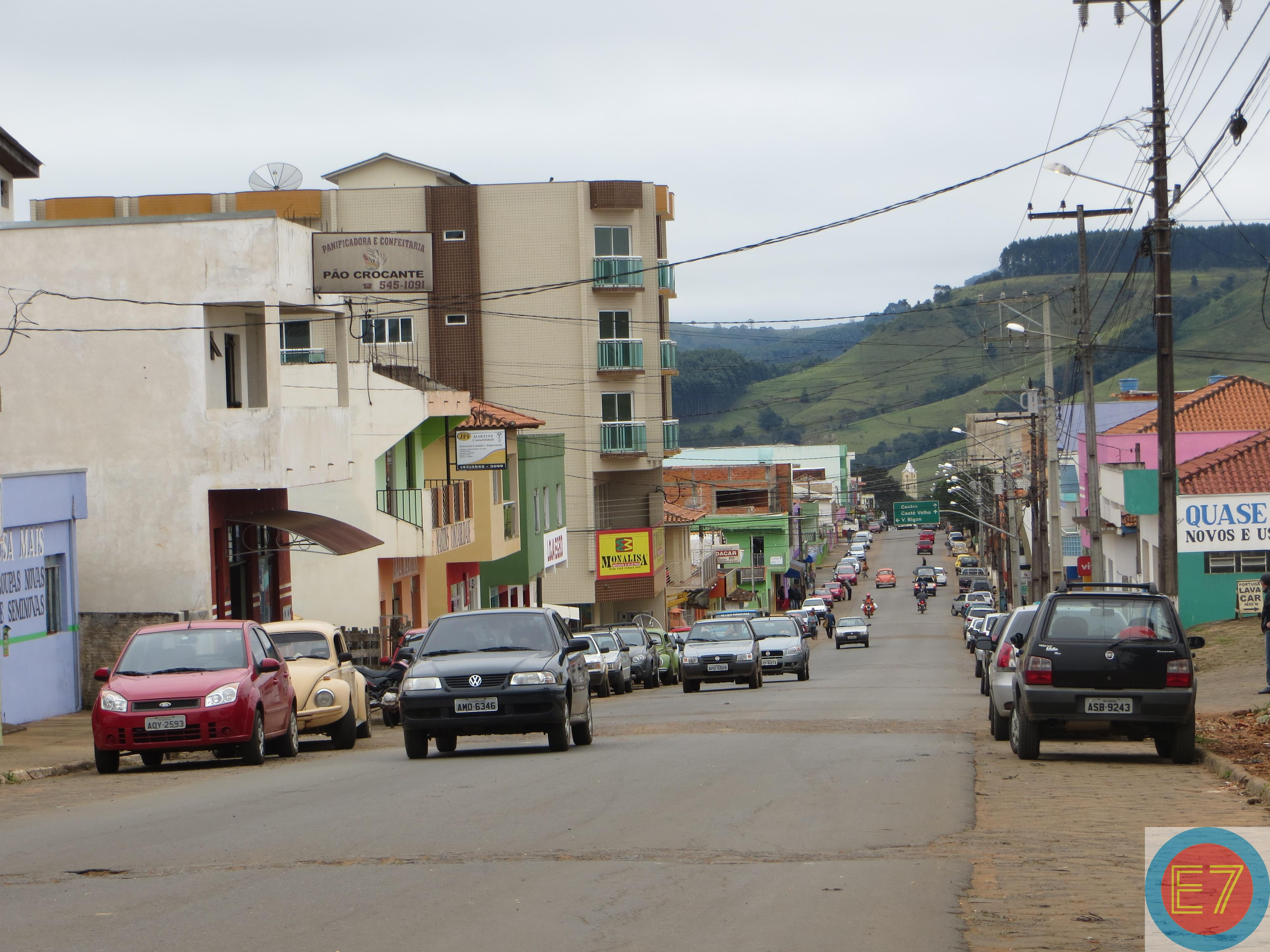
Antônio Cunha Avenue.

Industrial production contributed R$13,432,000 to the municipality’s GDP in 2012, primarily from agribusiness and timber extraction, with a smaller presence of mineral, non-metallic product, metallurgical, mechanical, chemical, food, and textile establishments. According to the IBGE, in 2013, 142,458 m³ of firewood and 350,149 m³ of logs were extracted, with 32.3% used for pulp production, and according to 2010 statistics, 8.18% of Curiúva’s workers were employed in the manufacturing sector.

In 2010, 7.73% of the employed population worked in construction, 1.25% in public utilities, 11.58% in commerce, and 26.81% in services, and in 2012, R$79,452,000 of the municipal GDP came from the gross added value of the tertiary sector. Since the settlement’s establishment, commerce has been a significant source of income for the population. In 1907, the first merchant, Constante José Borges, arrived in what was then Caetê from Tibagi. From 1913, commerce began to develop and prosper in the municipality, selling a wide variety of products such as food, fabrics, footwear, clothing, hats, hardware, and subsistence goods.

== Infrastructure ==
=== Housing and crime ===
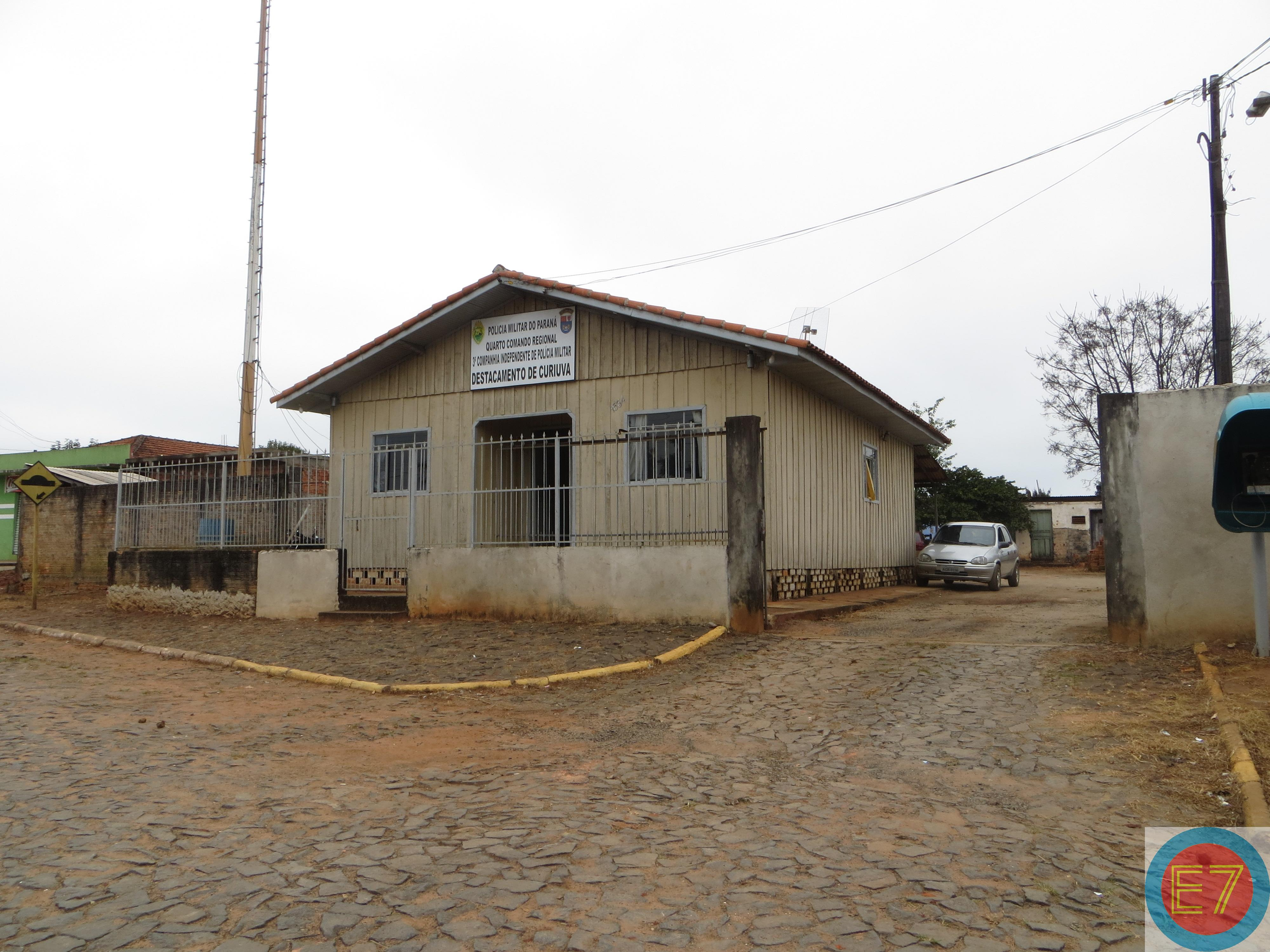
Detachment of the Military Police of Paraná State.

In 2010, the city had 4,391 permanent private households. Of these, 4,375 were houses, 16 were apartments, and there were no tenement houses. Of the total households, 3,196 were owned properties (2,865 fully paid and 331 under acquisition); 651 were rented; 541 were ceded (187 by employers and 354 in other ways), and three were occupied in other ways. Some of these residences had access to treated water, electricity, sewage, urban cleaning, fixed telephony, and mobile telephony. 3,218 households were served by the general water supply network (73.28% of the total); 4,147 (94.44%) had exclusive bathrooms; 3,346 (76.2%) were served by some form of garbage collection provided by the city hall; and 4,360 (99.29%) had electricity supply.

In 2008, the rates of homicide, suicide, and deaths from traffic accidents were low in Curiúva compared to much of Brazil. Under the Brazilian Federal Constitution, the municipality has a Municipal Guard, tasked with protecting public assets, services, and facilities. Public security services have existed since December 18, 1912, when, through State Decree No. 985, the Caetê Police District was created, with Sub-Commissioner Roberto Mathias taking office under Decree No. 996 on December 27 of the same year.

=== Healthcare and education ===
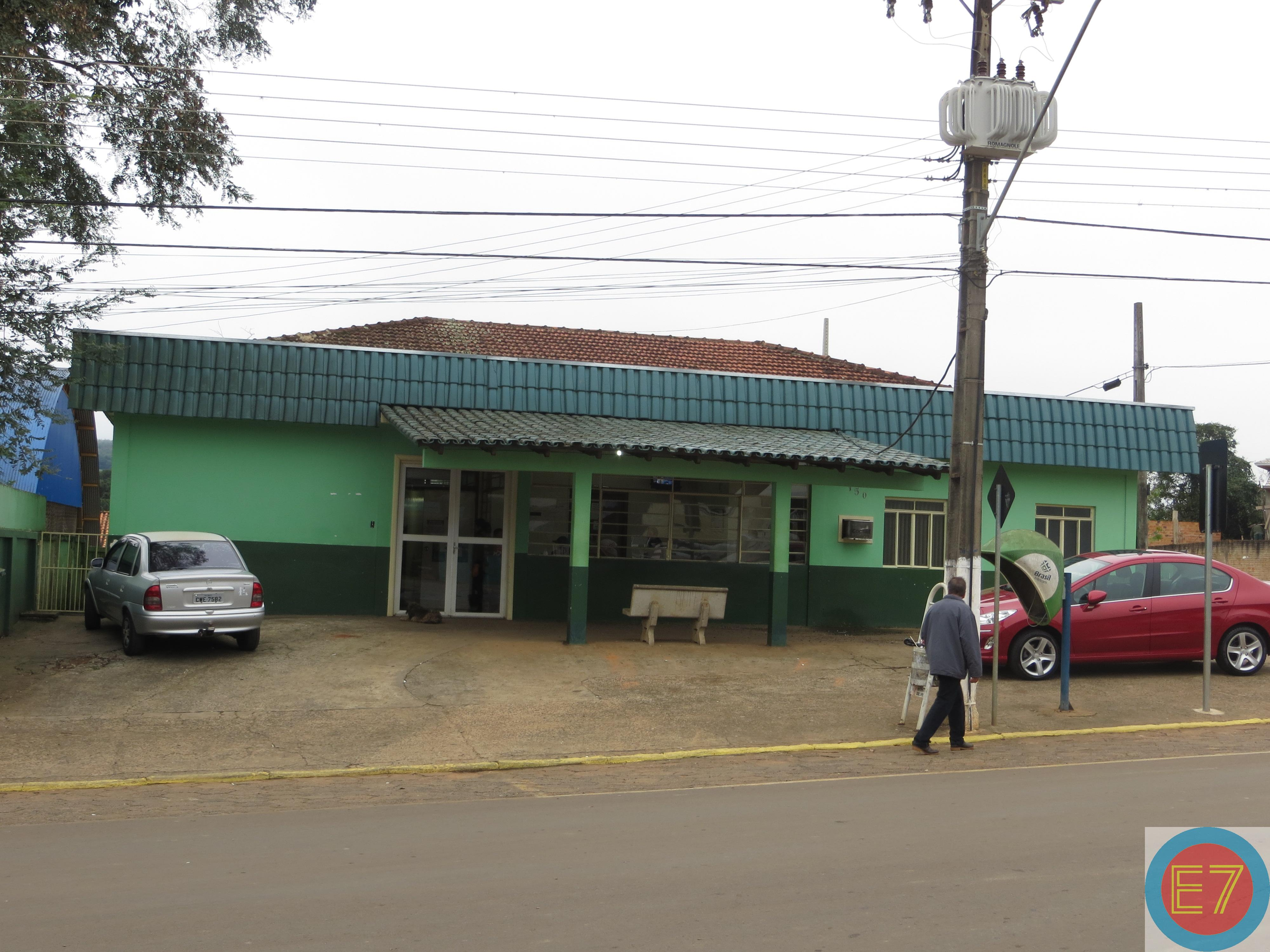
Curiúva Municipal Hospital

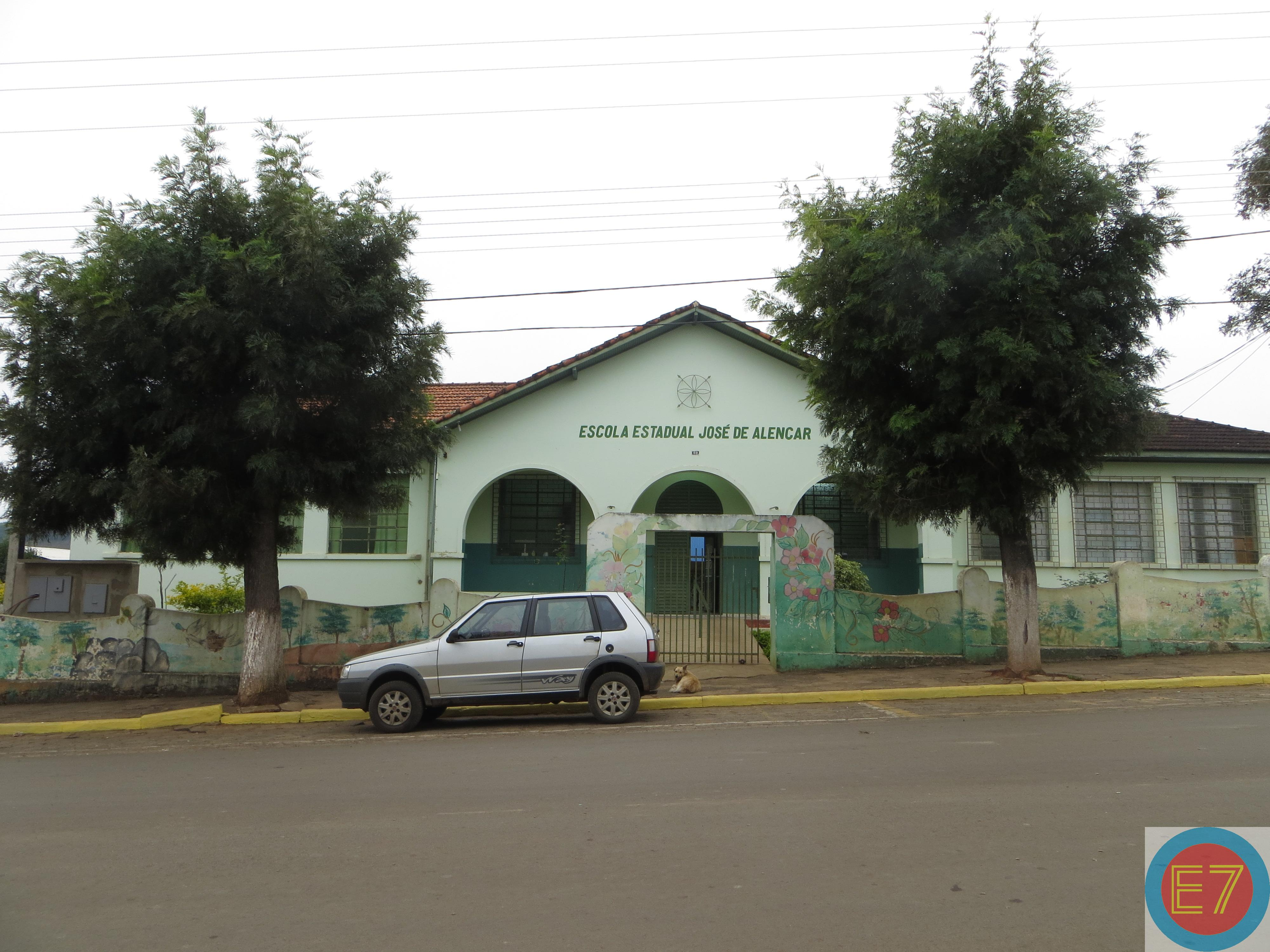
José de Alencar State School

In 2009, the municipality had nine healthcare facilities, including hospitals, emergency rooms, health centers, and dental services, with four being public municipal facilities and five private. All nine were part of the Unified Health System (SUS). In 2013, 84% of children under one year old had up-to-date vaccination records. In 2012, 191 live births were recorded, with an infant mortality rate of 15.7 deaths per thousand in that year. In 2010, 2.67% of girls aged 10 to 17 had children, with an activity rate of 14.02% among girls aged 10 to 14. Of the children under two years of age who were weighed by the Family Health Program in 2013, 0.2% were found to be malnourished.

In the field of education, the Basic Education Development Index (IDEB) average for Curiúva's public schools in 2013 was 4.8, on a scale ranging from 1 to 10. The score for 5th-grade students (formerly 4th grade) was 5.6, while for 9th-grade students (historically 8th grade), it was 3.9; the national average was 4.9. In 2010, 4.16% of children aged between six and fourteen were not enrolled in primary education. The completion rate for youths aged 15 to 17 was 61.6%, and the literacy rate for young people and adolescents aged 15 to 24 was 99.0%. In 2013, the age-grade distortion among primary education students, meaning those older than the recommended age, was 13.7% for the early years and 30.6% for the final years, while in secondary education, the distortion reached 27.7%. Among residents aged 18 or older, 25.99% had completed primary education, 14.53% had completed secondary education, and the population had, on average, an expected 10.95 years of schooling.

In 2010, according to data from the demographic census sample, out of the total population, 3,868 inhabitants were attending daycares and/or schools. Of this total, 62 attended daycare centers, 201 were in preschool, 66 were in literacy classes, 48 were in youth and adult education, 2,385 were in elementary school, 602 were in high school, 105 were in EJA (Youth and Adult Education) in the former elementary school system, and 108 were in the former secondary school system. Thirty-six were enrolled in higher education specialization courses, and 254 were in undergraduate programs. 10,055 people were not attending educational institutions, with 2,031 never having attended and 8,024 having attended at some point. In 2012, the municipality had 3,263 enrollments in its educational institutions, with 12 schools offering primary education, seven of which belonged to the state public network and five to the municipal network. Three schools providing secondary education were part of the state network.

Education in Curiúva in numbers (2012)
Level	Enrollments	Teachers	Schools (Total)
Early childhood education	262	13	6
Primary education	2,352	117	12
Secondary education	649	46	3

== Services ==
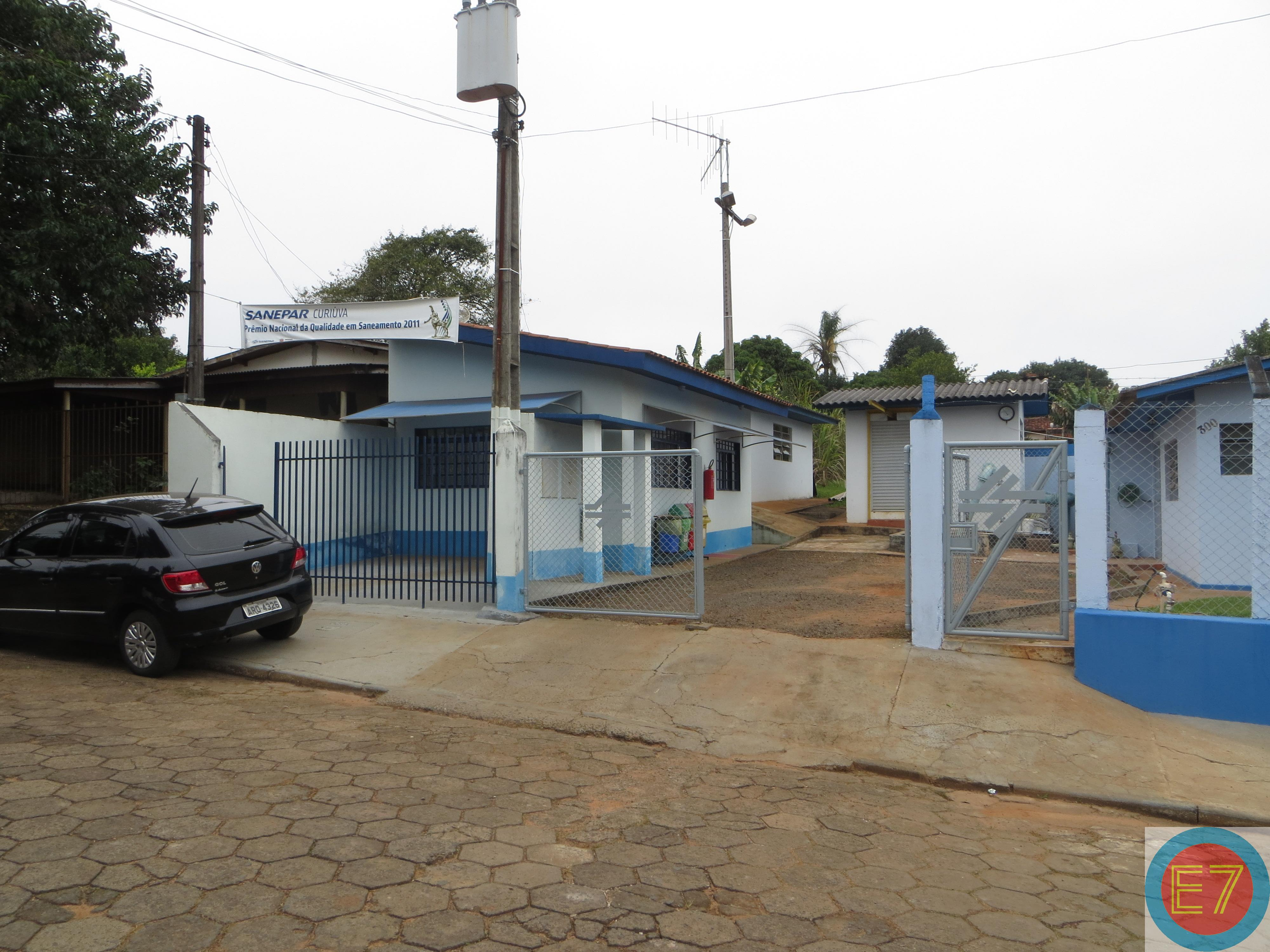
Branch of Sanepar, the company responsible for water supply in the city.

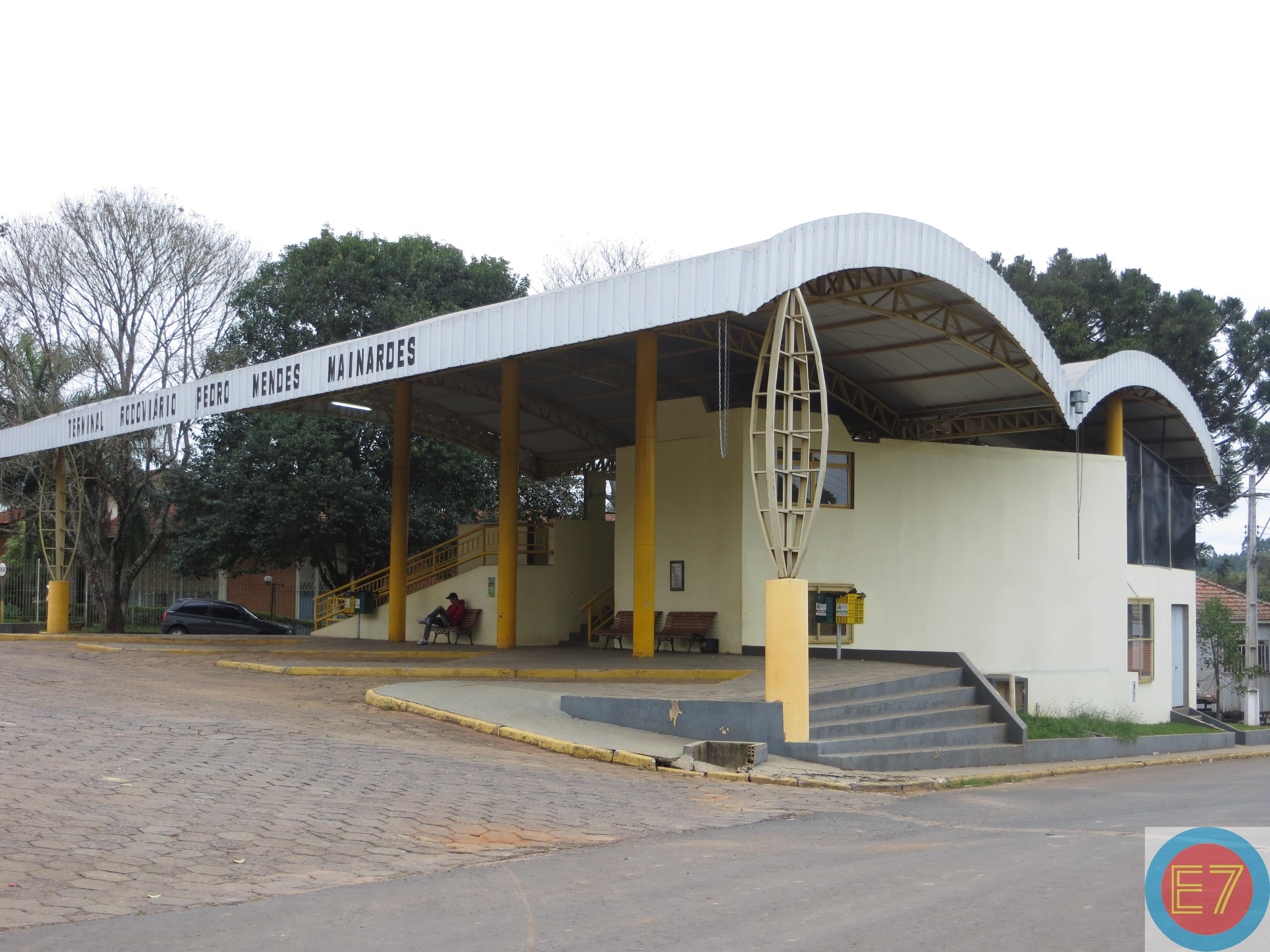
Pedro Mendes Mainardes Bus Terminal.

Electricity distribution in the municipality is provided by Companhia Paranaense de Energia (Copel). According to the company, in 2011, there were 5,027 consumers, and 15,502 kWh of energy was consumed, with a significant portion of the total energy consumed in the city coming from the Figueira Thermal Power Station, which was inaugurated in 1958 and began production on 4 April 1963. The water supply service for the entire city is managed by Sanepar.

The area code (DDD) for Curiúva is 043, and the postal code is 84280-000. On 1 September 2008, the municipality began to be served by number portability, along with other municipalities sharing the same DDD. Number portability allows users to change operators without needing to change their phone number.

== Transport ==
In December 2011, the municipal vehicle fleet consisted of 4,478 vehicles, including 2,343 cars, 214 trucks, 36 tractor-trucks, 347 pickups, 152 vans, 21 minibuses, 1,054 motorcycles, 132 mopeds, 75 buses, 42 trailers, 51 semi-trailers, one wheeled tractor, and ten utility vehicles. The city has a bus terminal, the Curiúva Bus Terminal, located in the city center on Edmundo Mercer Street, inaugurated on 29 April 2011 to replace the old one. It primarily connects the municipality to various cities in the states of Paraná and São Paulo. The first roads and vehicles appeared in the late 1940s and early 1950s during Tobias José Borges' administration, with the first bus line being Curiúva/Ibaiti, operated by Expresso Pássaro Brasileiro.

The municipality is served by PR-160 and PR-090, which intersect within the municipality, as well as PR-962, a small access road to PR-160. The municipality was also served by rail transport from the Paraná-Santa Catarina Railway Network (RVPSC), but the railway passed through the district (now municipality) of Figueira, far from Curiúva’s center. The station, Lysimaco Costa, was inaugurated on 15 September 1948 and was the last stop on the Barra Bonita Branch, connecting Figueira to Tomazina. It operated until 1969, when train services ceased. The city where the station was located became independent on 20 April 1982.

Regarding air transport, Curiúva does not have an airfield. The region is served by the Telêmaco Borba Airport, which offers regular flights. Other nearby airports include the Cornélio Procópio Airport and the Londrina Airport.

== Culture ==
=== Festivals and institutions ===
To promote local socioeconomic development, the Curiúva city government, sometimes in collaboration with local institutions, has increasingly invested in festivals and events. The main events include the patron saint festival of the Alecrim district, the celebration of Whitsun (in May or June), June festivals, the São Gonçalo Dance, and pilgrimages (also occurring in the neighboring city of Ventania). Additionally, in October, celebrations mark the anniversary of the city’s political emancipation. The Municipal Culture Council is a complementary body to the legislative process concerning the cultural sector, mandatorily composed of representatives from various sectors. In addition to public entities, other organizations contribute to Curiúva’s cultural sector, including the Curiúva Municipal Band, established by Law No. 437 on 30 August 1985, which performs at major civic events and religious festivals, and a Rotary Club, founded by local merchants on 10 March 1990.

=== Cuisine ===
The typical dish of the municipality of Curiúva is pork in a can.

=== Cultural spaces and sports ===
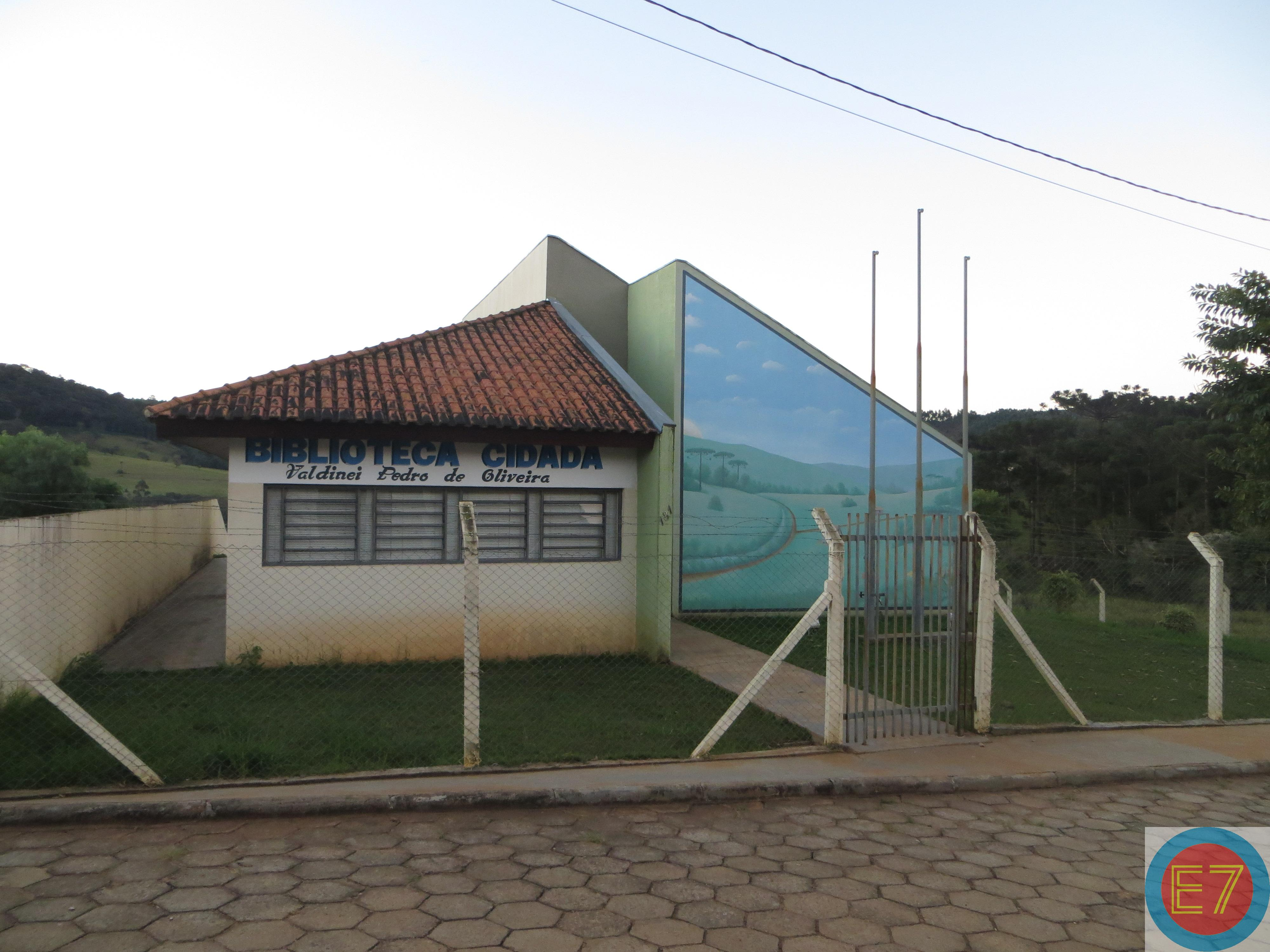
Valdiney Pedro de Oliveira Public Library.

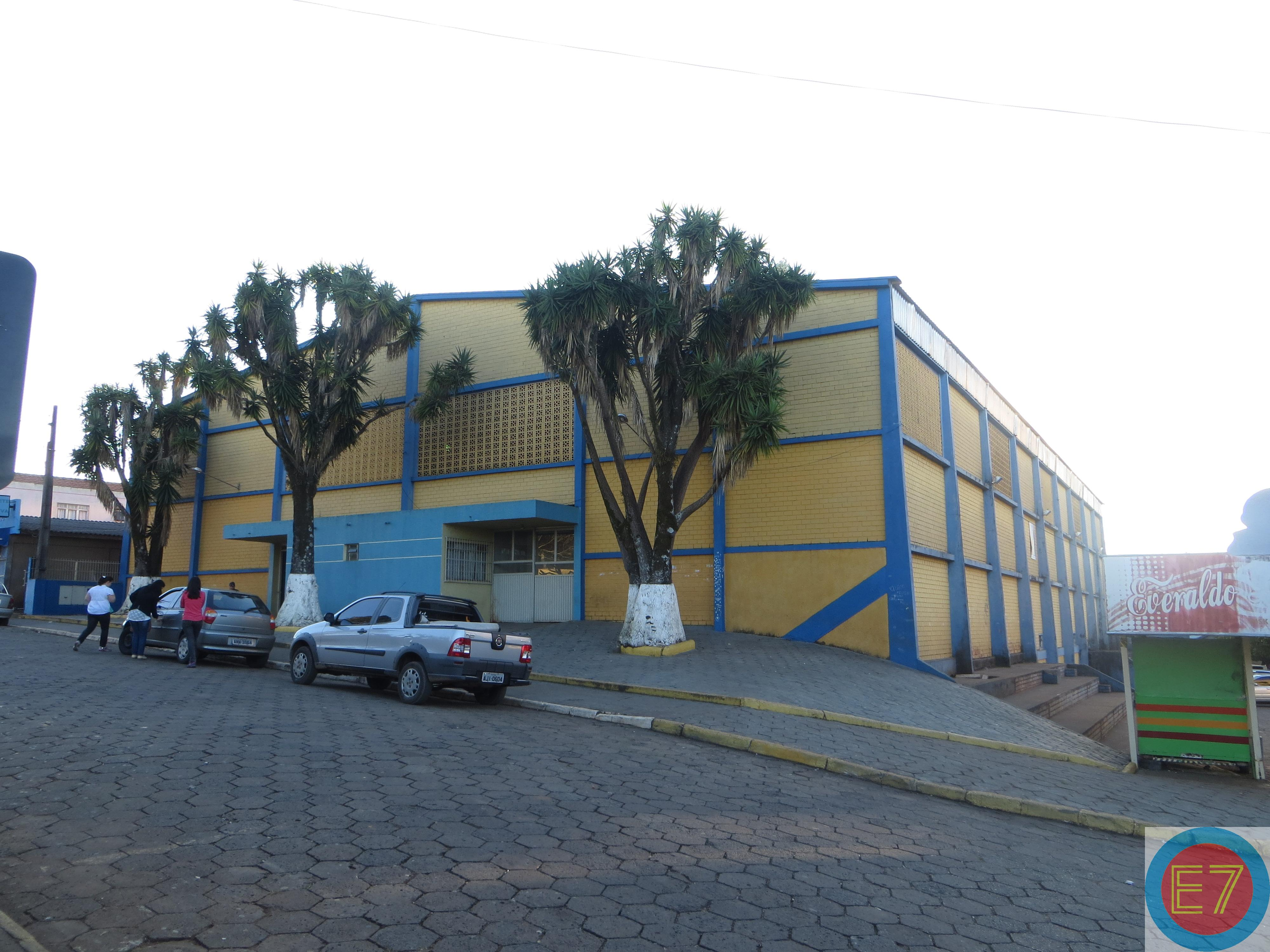
Caetê Sports Gymnasium.

Among the cultural spaces, there are four libraries, including the Valdeci Camargo de Jesus Library, as well as the Municipal Stadium and the Caetê Sports Gymnasium, although a new gymnasium with official standards is under construction. Another space is the Curiúva Sports and Recreational Club (CERC), formed on 6 September 1954 from the merger of the Curiúva Recreational Association (founded on 20 November 1952) and Curiúva EC (established on 2 June 1954). In addition to providing sports facilities, it hosts dances, events, and festivals. Amateur sports championships are also occasionally organized, such as the Municipal Futsal Championship and the Curiúva Regional Championship (also futsal), which includes teams from other cities.

=== Handicrafts ===
Handicrafts are one of the most spontaneous forms of cultural expression in Curiúva. Throughout the municipality, distinctive artisanal production can be found, made with regional raw materials and created according to local culture and lifestyle. Associations bring together local artisans, providing spaces for crafting, exhibiting, and selling handmade products. These items are typically sold at fairs, exhibitions, or craft shops. The federal Escola Ativa program operates in the city’s rural schools, offering craft and recycling courses to children and adolescents. According to the IBGE, the main artisanal activities in Curiúva include embroidery, works with fruits and seeds extracted from nature, and tapestry.

=== Holidays ===
Curiúva has two municipal holidays, according to 1997 city government data, in addition to eight national holidays and optional holidays. The municipal holidays are Whitsun, celebrated in May or June, and the city’s political emancipation day on 26 October. According to Brazil’s Federal Law No. 9093, enacted on 12 September 1995, municipalities may have up to four religious municipal holidays, including Good Friday.

== See also ==
- List of municipalities in Paraná
