= Figueira Thermal Power Station =

Coal-fired power plant in Paraná, Brazil

Figueira Thermal Power Plant
- Country: Brazil
- Location: Figueira, Paraná
- Coordinates: 23°51′09″S 50°23′25″W
- Construction began: 1963
- Owner: Companhia Paranaense de Energia

Power generation
- Nameplate capacity: 20 MW

The Figueira Thermal Power Plant (Portuguese: Usina Termelétrica de Figueira), also known as Utelfa, is a coal-fired power station located in the Brazilian municipality of Figueira, in the Peixe River Valley, in Paraná. The power plant has an installed capacity of 20 megawatts and belongs to Companhia Paranaense de Energia (Copel). The raw material is extracted from the main coal basin in Paraná, located in the Norte Pioneiro area. It is the only thermal power station in the state that depends exclusively on mineral coal.

== History ==
Coal mining in the northern region of Paraná began in the 1930s. Consequently, a thermal power station was developed due to the increase in exploitation and the abundance of the raw material.

In 1963, the power plant was equipped with two boilers and two generator sets; three years later, the third boiler was installed. In 1969, Copel acquired Utelfa and installed the third unit in 1974. In 1997, the operation and maintenance of the power plant was outsourced and is currently carried out by Companhia Carbonífera do Cambuí, which is also responsible for supplying the coal consumed at the power plant. The company extracts approximately 7,000 tons of coal per month.

In 2015, the Figueira Thermal Power Plant began modernization procedures involving a total of 106 million reais in investments. The project included a new generator circuit and the replacement of the boilers, as required by the Brazilian Electricity Regulatory Agency (ANEEL). In September 2017, work began on modernizing the thermoelectric plant, but it remained unfinished in 2019.

In January 2021, Copel signed a contract with the Consortium formed by Engeluz Iluminação e Eletricidade and NJB Engenharia to finish the modernization work at the Figueira Thermal Power Plant. The contract includes the engineering services, supply of materials and equipment, development of projects, civil works, electromechanical assembly and tests necessary for the power plant to produce electricity again. The deadline for execution is six months and the investment in this last stage of the project is R$37.3 million.

With 300 direct workers, it is the company that employs the most people in the municipality.

== See also ==
- Companhia Paranaense de Energia
- History of Paraná
- Mining in Paraná
