= Pico Agudo (Sapopema) =

Peak in Paraná, Brazil

Coordinates: 23.8972532°S 50.7742711°W

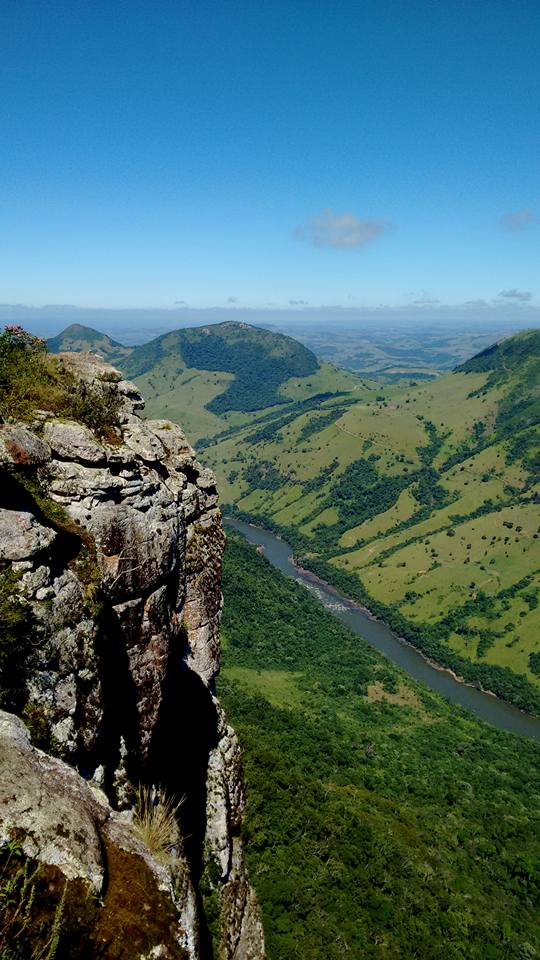
Aerial photo of Pico Agudo in Sapopema.

The Pico Agudo (Portuguese: 'acute peak') is a peak near the Brazilian municipality of Sapopema, Paraná. It is 15 kilometres (9.3 mi) West of Sapopema, overlooking the valley of the Tibagi River, 20 kilometres (12 mi) North and downstream of the Mauá Hydroelectric Plant.

The Pico Agudo is 4,000 feet (1,200 m) in height and is the main tourist attraction for walkers in the Sapopema prefecture.

It was surveyed between 1920 and 1930 by Reinhard Maack, one of the first geologists to explore the region, who made a geological survey of the Tibagi River valley.

== Sources ==
- Pelarim, Juliana Grigoli (2010). "Avaliação das contribuições do projeto "Inventário dos atrativos naturais de Ortigueira - PR"" (PDF) (in Portuguese). Universidade Estadual de Londrina.
