= Laranjinha River =

River in Brazil

Coordinates: 23°01′54″S 50°26′52″W

Location
- Country: Brazil

Physical characteristics
- Source
  - location: Paraná state
- Mouth
  - location: Ventania
- Length: 350km

The Laranjinha River is a river of Paraná state situated in southern Brazil. It is a tributary of Jacaré River (Rio das Cinzas), which is located between the towns of Bandeirantes and Santa Mariana and feeds into Paranapanema River. Laranjinha runs mainly towards the north and is roughly 350 km long, making it one of the main water sources of the state. The source of Laranjinha lies in the municipality of Ventania.

The river has one hydroelectric plant, in commercial operation since 2008.

== See also ==
- List of rivers of Paraná
