= Mauá Hydroelectric Plant =

Mauá Dam
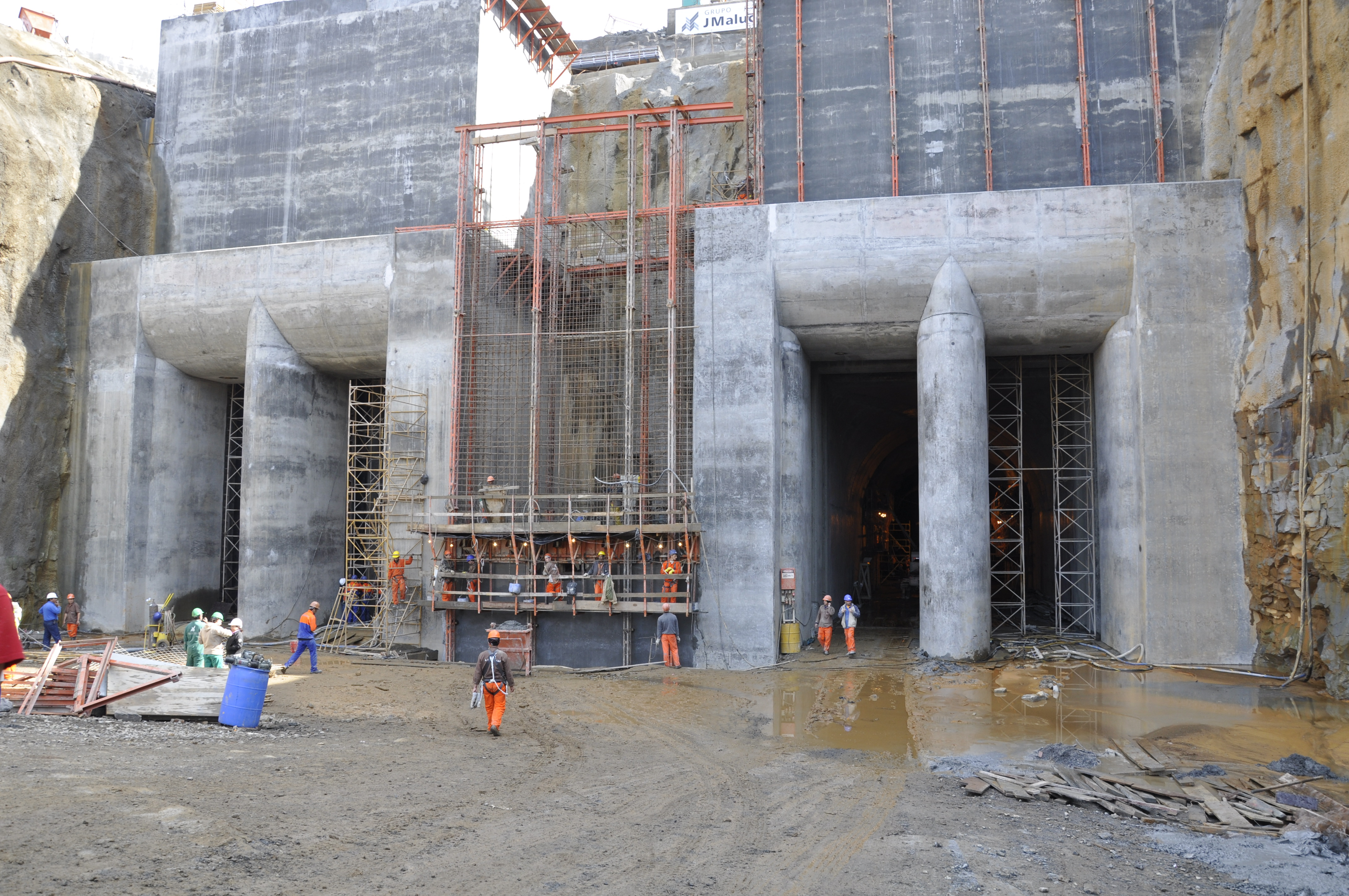

- Location within Brazil
- Official name: Mauá Hydroelectric Plant
- Location: Telêmaco Borba and Ortigueira, Paraná, Brazil
- Coordinates: 24°03′45″S 50°42′28″W
- Construction began: 2008
- Opening date: 2012
- Construction cost: $500.000.000,00 USD
- Owners: Copel and Eletrosul

Dam and spillways
- Type of dam: Gravity, roller-compacted concrete
- Impounds: Tibagi River
- Height: 85 m (279 ft)
- Length: 745 m (2,444 ft)
- Spillway type: Service, controlled

Reservoir
- Creates: Mauá Reservoir
- Surface area: 84 km^{2} (32 mi^{2})

Power Station
- Commission date: 2012
- Installed capacity: 361 MW

The Mauá Hydroelectric Plant, is a dam and hydroelectric power plant on the Tibagi River near Telêmaco Borba and Ortigueira in Paraná, Brazil.

== See also ==
- List of power stations in Brazil
