= Ortigueira, Paraná =

Coordinates: 24°12′S 50°55′W

Ortigueira
- Municipality
- Municipality of Ortigueira
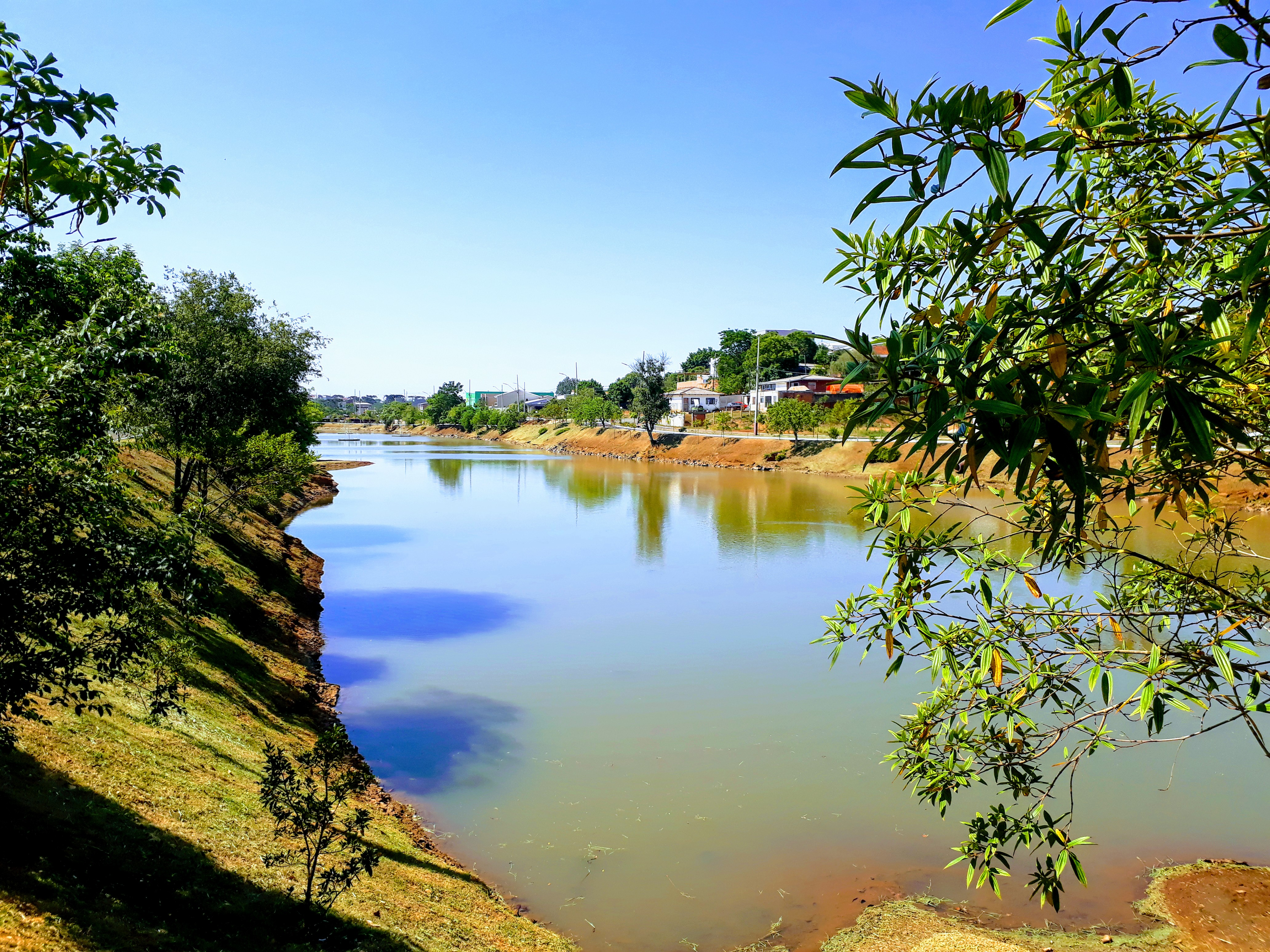

- Flag Coat of arms

- Country: Brazil
- Region: Southern
- State: Paraná
- Mesoregion: Centro Oriental Paranaense

Government
  - Mayor: João Marcos da Silva

Population (2020)
  - Total: 21,960
- Time zone: UTC−3 (BRT)

Ortigueira, Paraná is a municipality in the state of Paraná in the Southern Region of Brazil.

== See also ==
- List of municipalities in Paraná
- Mauá Hydroelectric Plant
- Klabin
