= São Jerônimo da Serra =

Coordinates: 23°43′S 50°44′W

- Municipality
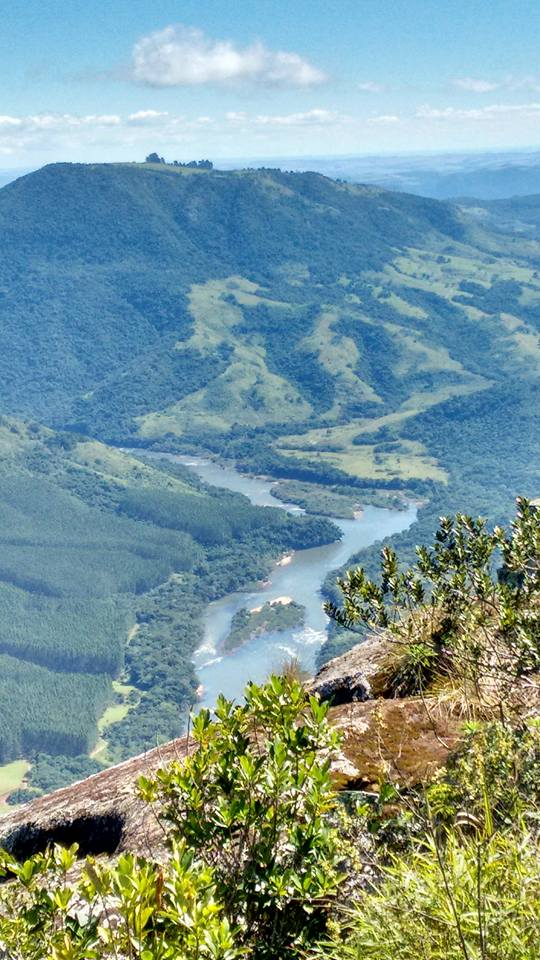
- Morro do Taff, in São Jerônimo da Serra

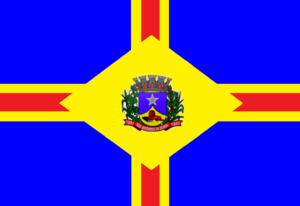
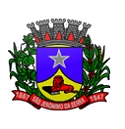
- Flag Coat of arms
- Interactive map of São Jerônimo da Serra
- Country: Brazil
- Region: Southern
- State: Paraná
- Mesoregion: Norte Pioneiro Paranaense

Population (2020)
  - Total: 11,128
- Time zone: UTC−3 (BRT)

São Jerônimo da Serra is a municipality in the state of Paraná in the Southern Region of Brazil.

== History ==
The settlement of São Jerônimo da Serra began in 1854, when an inland trail was opened under the command of the explorer Joaquim Francisco Lopes to improve travel routes toward Mato Grosso. The community grew after the construction of a small chapel dedicated to Saint Jerome in 1870, becoming a parish in 1882 and officially a municipality in 1920. During the 20th century, the municipality underwent several name and territorial changes, permanently adopting the name São Jerônimo da Serra in 1951.

== Economy ==
The economy of São Jerônimo da Serra is mainly based on agriculture and livestock farming, with important production of coffee, soybeans, corn, beans, and fruits, as well as forestry and animal husbandry. These activities play a central role in the municipality’s economic development.

== Tourism ==
São Jerônimo da Serra is known for its natural and cultural tourism, featuring waterfalls, caves, scenic viewpoints, and Indigenous villages. Among its main attractions are the Vale do Tigre, Morro do Taff, and several waterfalls, as well as an important group of sandstone caves considered one of the most significant in the state of Paraná for ecotourism and geological studies.

== Culinary ==
The cuisine of São Jerônimo da Serra is strongly influenced by the rural and cattle-driving traditions of northern Paraná. Traditional dishes are usually prepared on wood-burning stoves and use locally produced ingredients such as corn, beans, cassava, pork, and beef. Common foods include rice and beans, free-range chicken, barbecue, and corn-based dishes like polenta, pamonha, and quirera. The local gastronomy also reflects Indigenous influences, preserving native traditions found in community celebrations, such as ēmī, a fermented corn flour dish served with meat.

== See also ==
- List of municipalities in Paraná
