= Sapopema =

Coordinates: 23°55′S 50°35′W

- Municipality
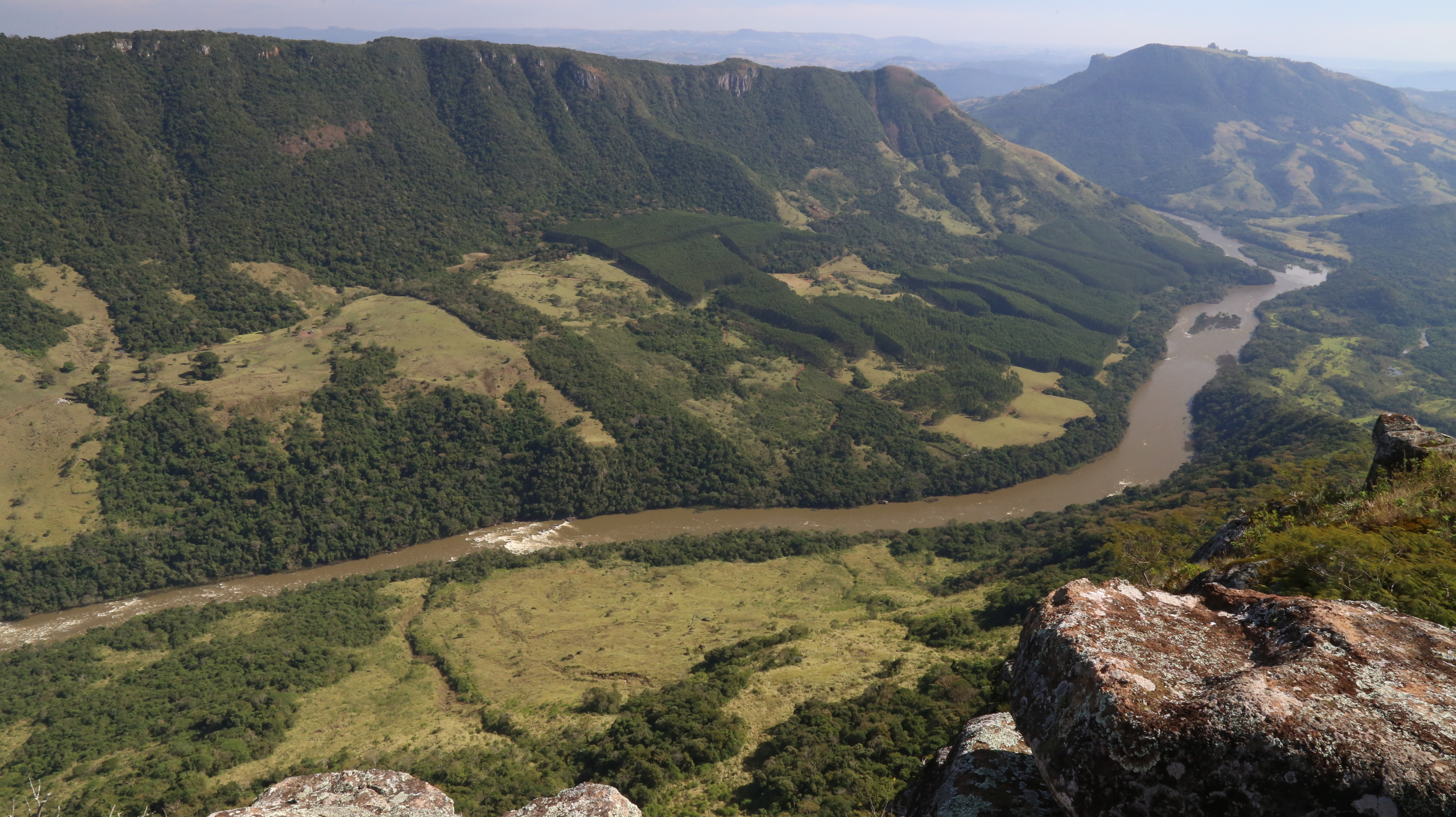

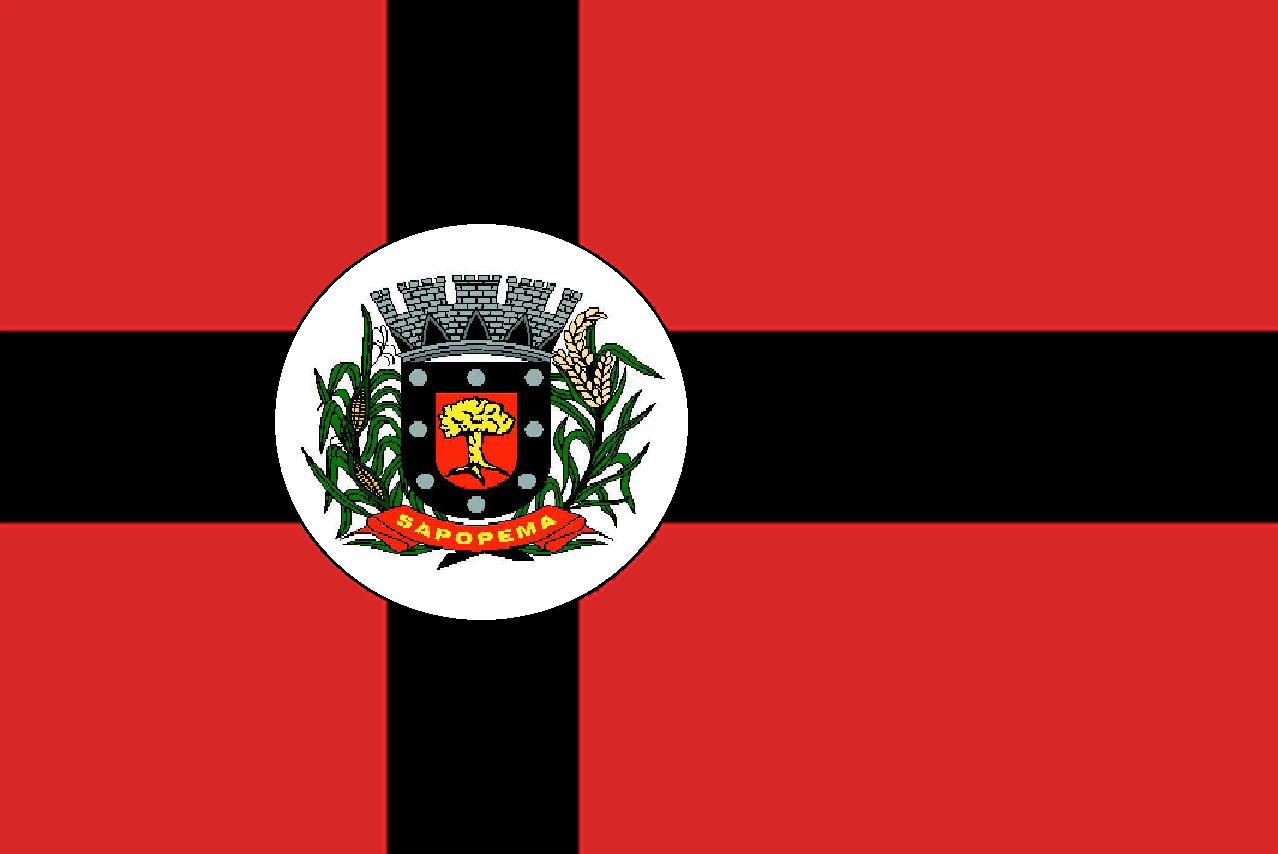
- Flag

- Country: Brazil
- Region: Southern
- State: Paraná
- Mesoregion: Norte Pioneiro Paranaense

Population (2020)
  - Total: 6,722
- Time zone: UTC−3 (BRT)

Sapopema is a municipality in the state of Paraná in the Southern Region of Brazil.

Two popular tourist attractions in the area are the Pico Agudo, overlooking the valley of the Tibagi River, and the waterfall of Salto das Orquídeas.

Prefeito : Paulinho Branco PSB (2021-2024)

== See also ==
- List of municipalities in Paraná
