= Sanepar =

Brazilian water supply and sewage company

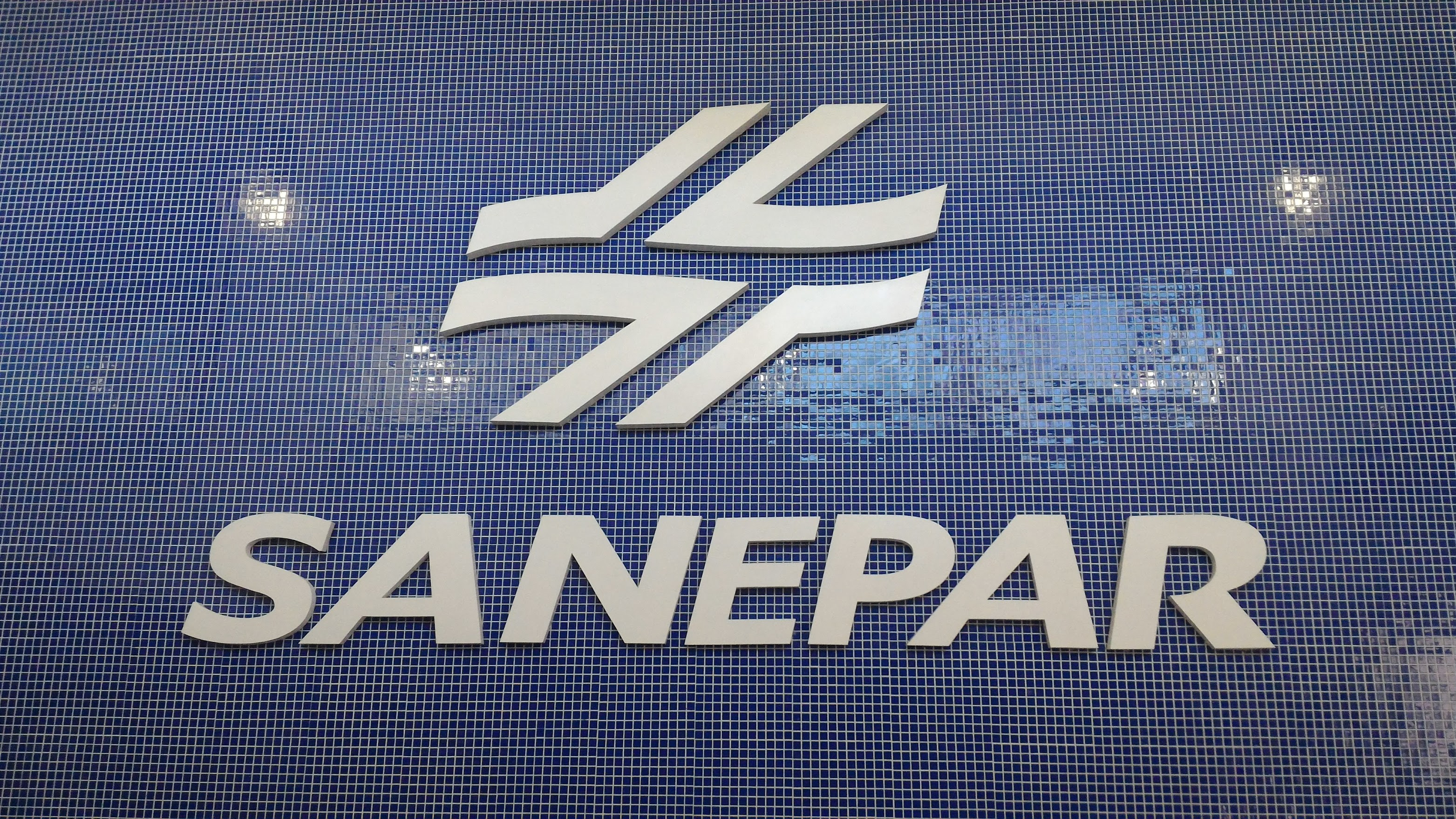
- Native name: Companhia de Saneamento do Paraná S.A
- Company type: Sociedade Anônima
- Traded as: B3: SAPR11, SAPR3, SAPR4; Ibovespa Component
- Industry: Water supply, Sewage, Waste management
- Founded: 1963
- Headquarters: Curitiba, Brazil
- Key people: Mauro Machado Costa, (Chairman); Luciano Bello Machado, (CEO)
- Products: Water; Waste services Bioenergy
- Revenue: ▲US$ 1.0 billion (2018)
- Net income: ▲US$ 229.8 million (2018)
- Number of employees: 7,165
- Website: www.sanepar.com.br

Sanepar is a Brazilian water supply and sewage company owned by Paraná state. It also operates in the waste management sector. It provides services to residential, commercial and industrial users in 345 cities and another 293 smaller areas in Paraná and on the city of Porto União, Santa Catarina state. It provides water to 26.7 million customers, or 60% of the population of the state. It is one of the largest water and waste management company in Brazil. It provides sanitation services, which include all phases (abstraction, treatment, processing, distribution) and the collection, treatment and reuse of sewage. It has an 84,600 kilometer network for the withdrawal and distribution of drinking water, for sewage collection and for the discharge of treated sewage. Regarding solid waste, it operates landfills in Apucarana, Cornélio Procópio and Cianorte.

Sanepar was founded in 1963 as Agepar. Today its stocks are traded on the São Paulo Stock Exchange. Headquartered in Curitiba, Sanepar provides a universal water supply network in all the municipalities it serves. 100% of the sewage it collects is treated before discharge into water bodies.

In addition Sanepar also has a 40% stake in CS Bioenergia S.A., a special purpose enterprise incorporated in partnership with Cattalini Bioenergia to exploit sewage-based energy generation at the biodigestion unit implanted next to the Belém wastewater treatment plant in Curitiba. The activities of CS Bioenergia will comply with Brazilian national solid waste policy governing the non-generation/reduction, reuse, treatment and disposal of waste.

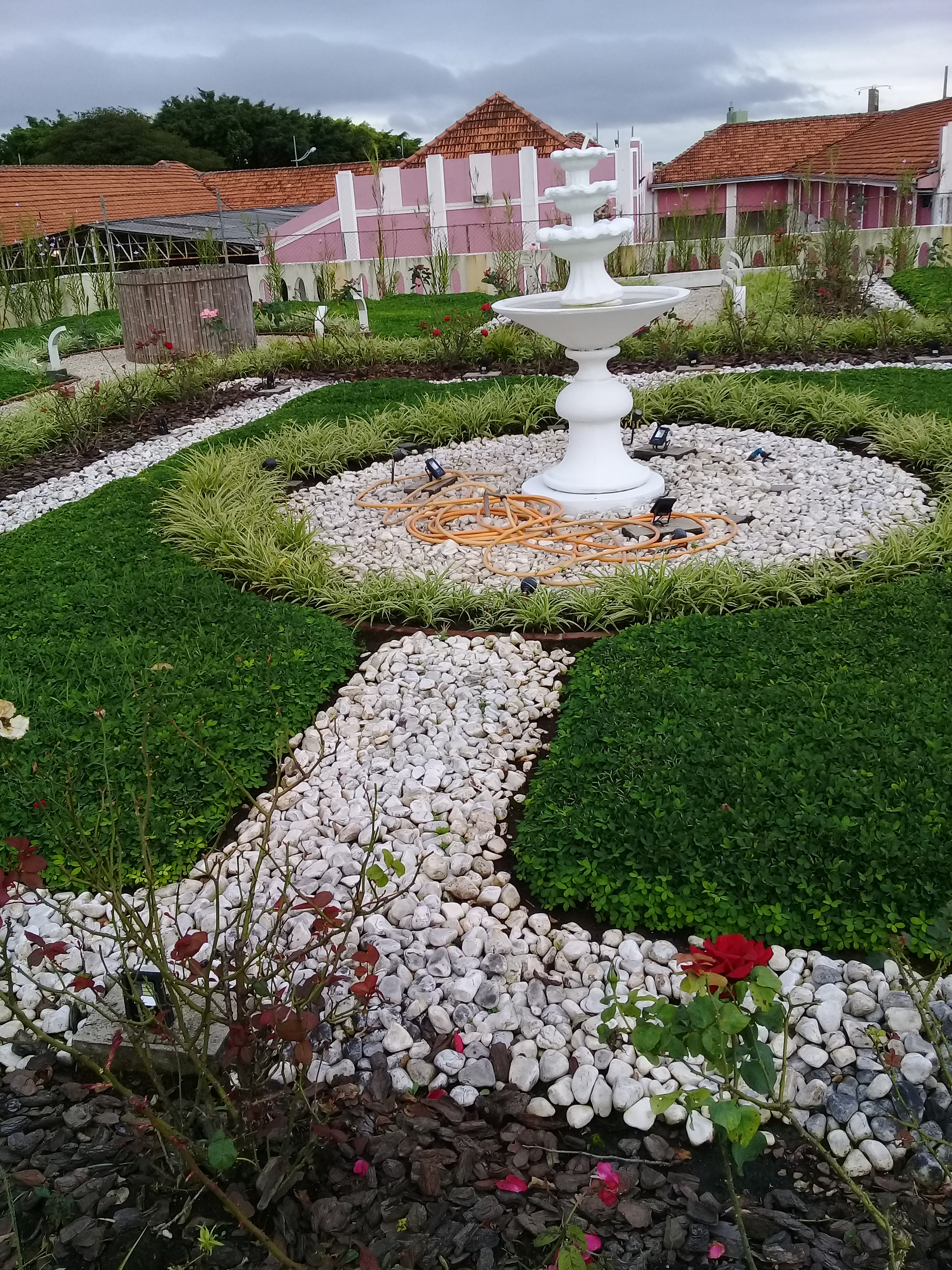
Garden on the first reservoir of Ponta Grossa, Botuquara Reservoir (half-buried type) created in 1914, before the existence of public squares. Since 1971 belongs to SANEPAR, and the visit to the centennial is reopened.
