= Ibaiti =

Coordinates: 23°50′S 50°10′W

- Municipality
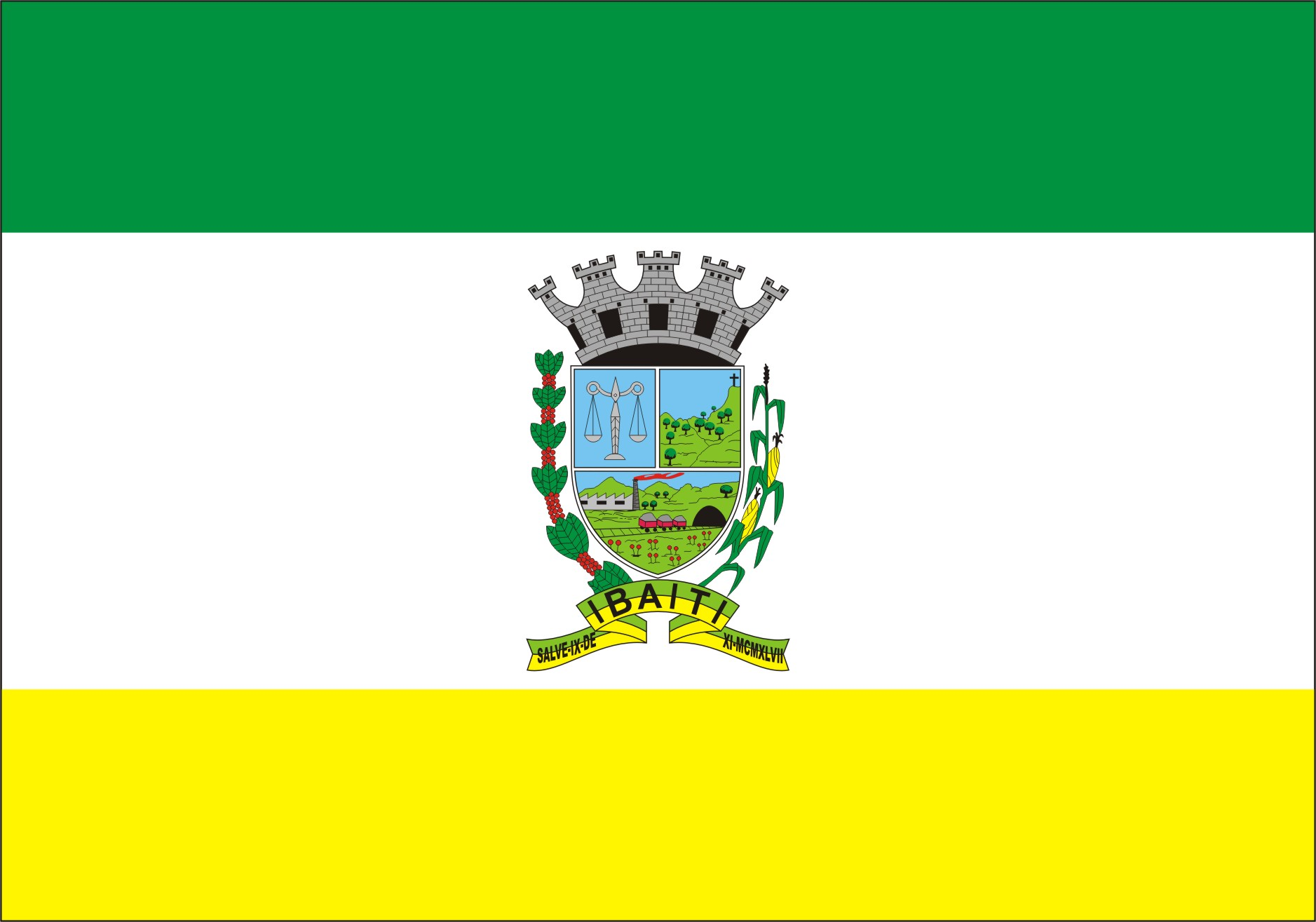
- Flag Coat of arms
- Interactive map of Ibaiti
- Country: Brazil
- Region: Southern
- State: Paraná
- Mesoregion: Norte Pioneiro Paranaense

Population (2020)
  - Total: 31,644
- Time zone: UTC−3 (BRT)

Ibaiti is a municipality in the state of Paraná in the Southern Region of Brazil.

== See also ==
- List of municipalities in Paraná
