= Ventania =

Coordinates: 24°14′45″S 50°14′34″W

- Municipality
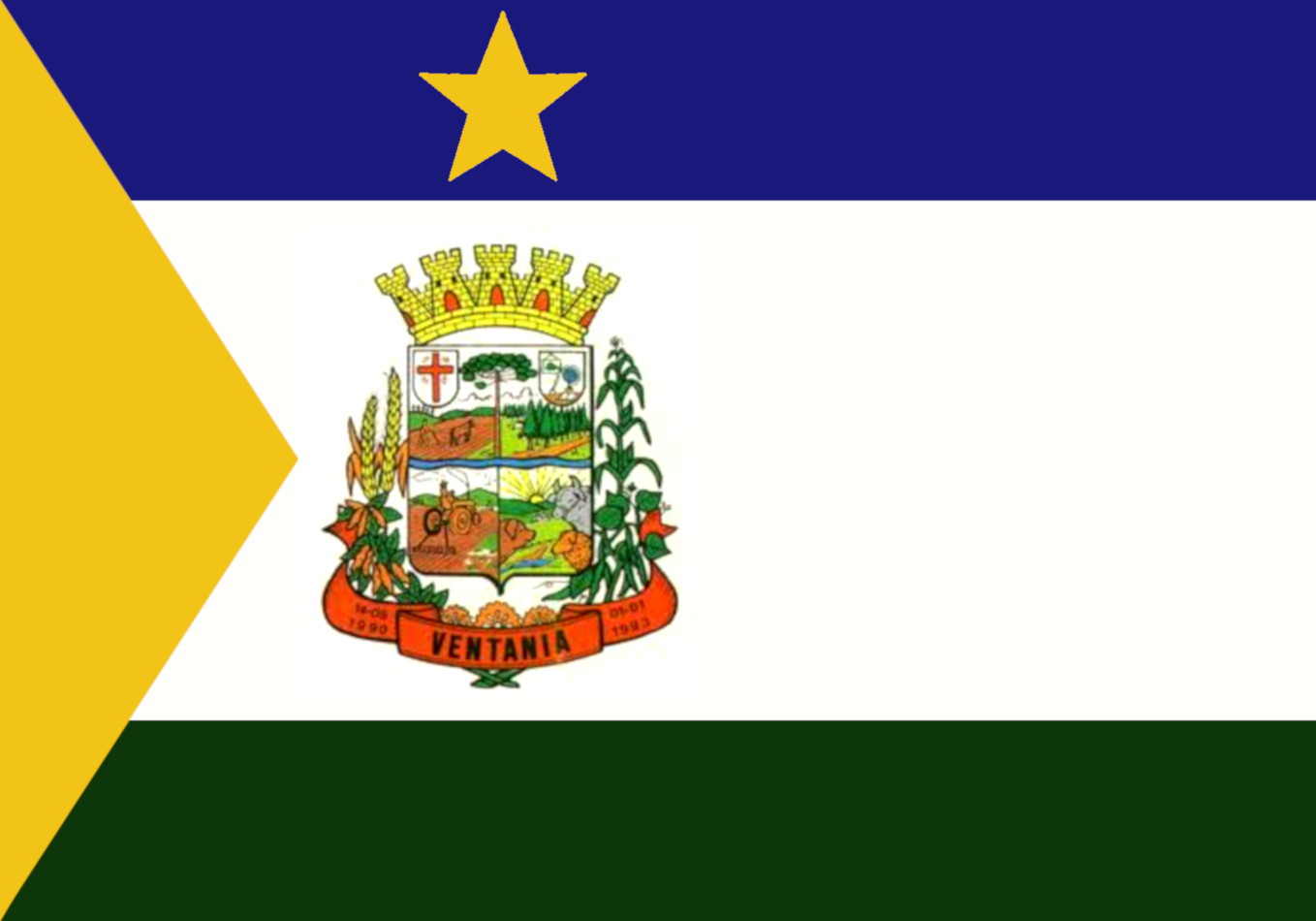
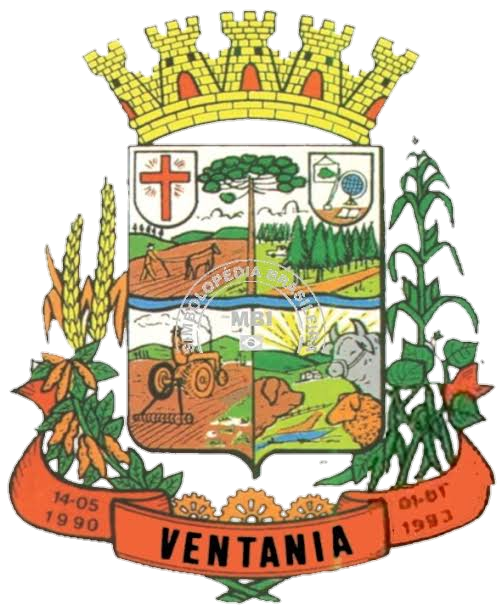
- Flag Coat of arms
- Interactive map of Ventania
- Country: Brazil
- Region: Southern
- State: Paraná
- Mesoregion: Centro Oriental Paranaense

Population (2020)
  - Total: 12,088
- Time zone: UTC−3 (BRT)

Ventania is a municipality in the state of Paraná in the Southern Region of Brazil.

== See also ==
- List of municipalities in Paraná
