= Figueira, Paraná =

Figueira
- Municipality
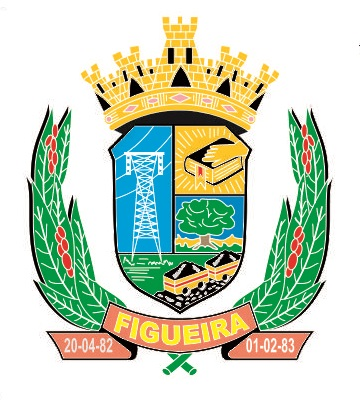
- Flag Coat of arms

- Location in Brazil
- Coordinates: 23°50′56″S 50°24′10″W
- Country: Brazil
- Region: Southern
- State: Paraná
- Mesoregion: Norte Pioneiro Central

Government
  - prefeito: Jose Carlos

Area
  - Total: 50.118 sq mi (129.806 km^{2})

Population (2020)
  - Total: 8,254
- Time zone: UTC−3 (BRT)

Figueira is a municipality in the state of Paraná in the Southern Region of Brazil.

== See also ==
- List of municipalities in Paraná
