= Copel =

Brazilian electric utility company

Companhia Paranaense de Energia
- Company type: Sociedade Anônima
- Traded as: B3: CPLE3, CPLE5, CPLE6; BMAD: XCOP; NYSE: ELP; Ibovespa Component
- Industry: Electricity
- Founded: 1954; 72 years ago
- Headquarters: Curitiba, Brazil
- Products: Electrical power
- Services: Electricity distribution
- Revenue: ▲US$ 4.3 billion (2017)
- Net income: ▲US$ 323.9 million (2017)
- Number of employees: 6,613
- Website: www.copel.com

Companhia Paranaense de Energia (COPEL) is a Brazilian electric utility company, the largest company of the State of Paraná, founded on October 26, 1954 with ownership control held by the State of Paraná.

The Company went public in April 1994 on the Brazilian B3 stock market, and in 1997 was the first company of the Brazilian electricity sector to be listed at the New York Stock Exchange. As from June 2002, the brand is also present at the European Economic Community, having been listed at Latibex - the Latin American index of companies of the Madrid Stock Exchange. As of May 7, 2008, Copel's shares were ranked at Level 1 of São Paulo Stock Exchange (Bovespa)'s Corporate Governance. In 2019, Copel announced a plan to divest their natural gas and telecommunications holdings to focus entirely on electricity. In 2020, Copel Telecom was sold to the Bordeaux Fundo de Investimento.

The Company directly serves 3,549,256 consuming units, across 393 cities and 1,114 locations (districts, villages and settlements), located in the State of Paraná. This network consists of 2.8 million homes, 63.8 plants, 295.5 commercial establishments and 341.6 rural properties. The staff is composed of 8,376 employees.
