= Marcelo Belinati =

Brazilian politician

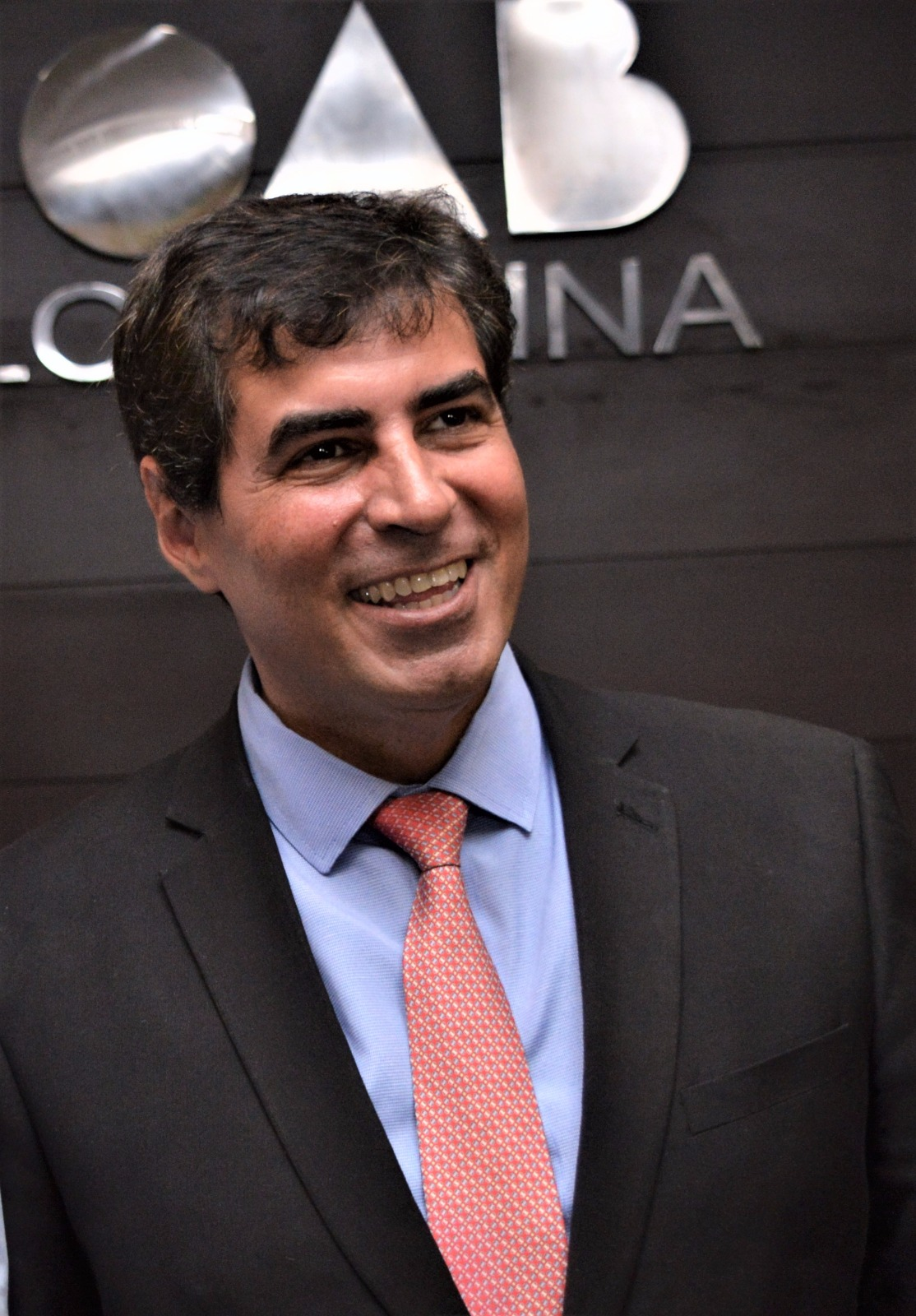

Mayor of Londrina
- In office 1 January 2017 – 1 January 2025
- Preceded by: Alexandre Kireeff
- Succeeded by: Tiago Amaral

Federal deputy of Paraná
- In office 1 February 2015 – 31 December 2016

Councilman of Londrina
- In office 1 January 2005 – 1 January 2013

Personal details
- Born: Marcelo Belinati Martins; 22 July 1971 (age 55) Londrina, Paraná, Brazil
- Party: PSL (2003–2005); PP (2005–present)
- Relatives: Antonio Belinati (uncle)
- Education: State University of Londrina; Universidade Gama Filho

Marcelo Belinati Martins (born 22 July 1971) is a Brazilian doctor, lawyer, and politician affiliated with the Progressistas (PP). He has been the mayor of Londrina since 2017, having been initially elected in 2016 and reelected in 2020.

== Biography ==
Born in Londrina on 22 July 1971, Belinati graduated with a degree in Medicine and Law from State University of Londrina. His uncle is former mayor of Londrina Antonio Belinati, who was married to former vice-governor of Paraná, Emília Belinati.

He was first elected as a councilman in 2004, with 6,578 votes for the PSL. He was reelected in 2008 with more than 8,000 votes as a member of the PP.

During the 2012 elections, he ran for mayor of Londrina. He ended up losing in the second round to Alexandre Kireeff (PSD). In a tight race, Belinati received 49.47% (138,049 votes) to Kireeff's 50.53% (141,027 votes).

During the 2014 elections, he ran to become a federal deputy, and was elected 137,817 votes.

During the 2016 elections, he was elected mayor of Londrina with 51.57% of the vote. He was reelected in 2020 with more than 70% of the vote, being the first mayor reelected in the first round in Londrina's history. As mayor, he was responsible for making Londrina the most transparent city government in Brazil, according to data from the Comptroller General of Brazil.
