= 2008 Brazilian municipal elections =

Local elections in Brazil

- October 5, 2008

Mayors and councillors of all the 5,568 municipalities of Brazil
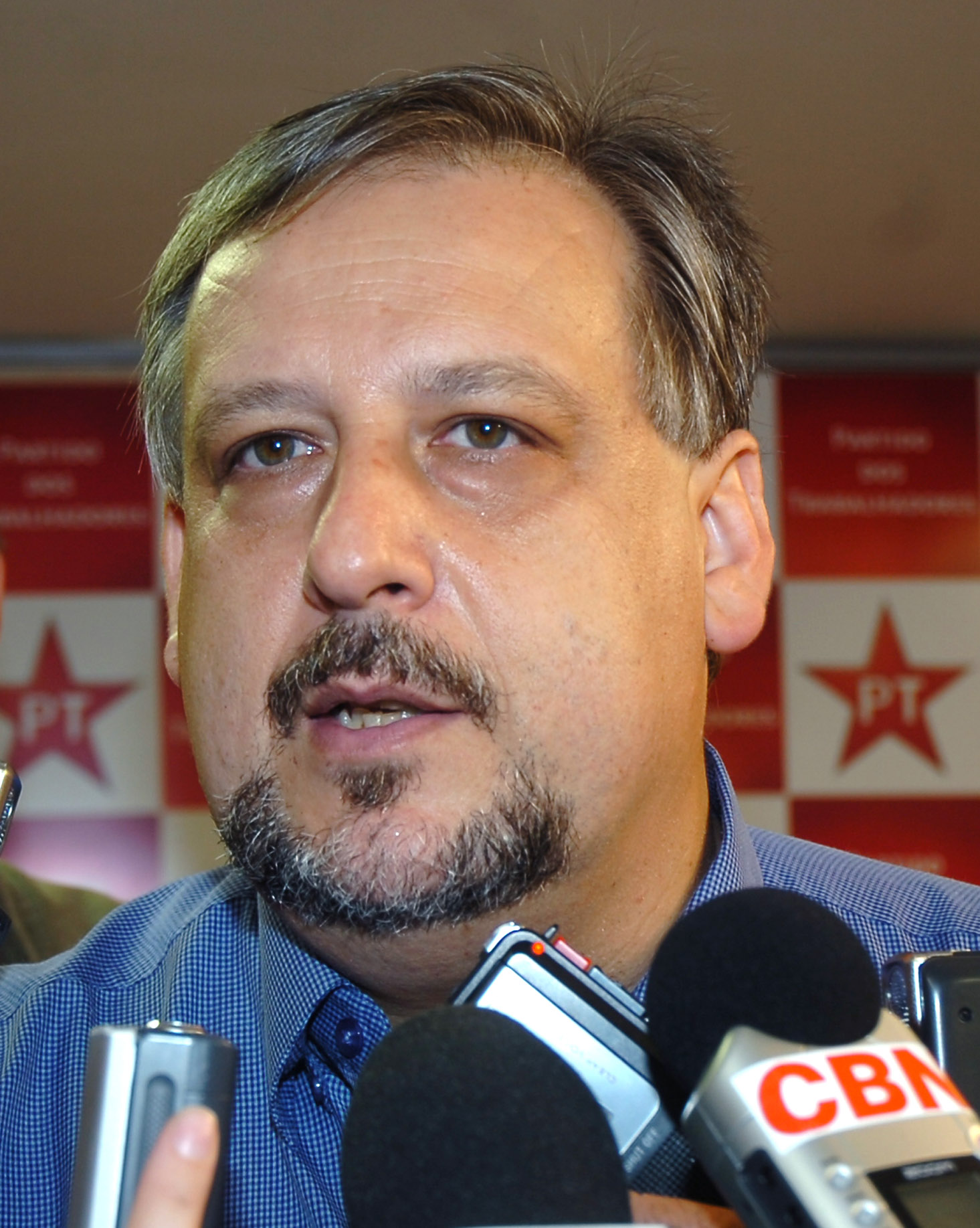

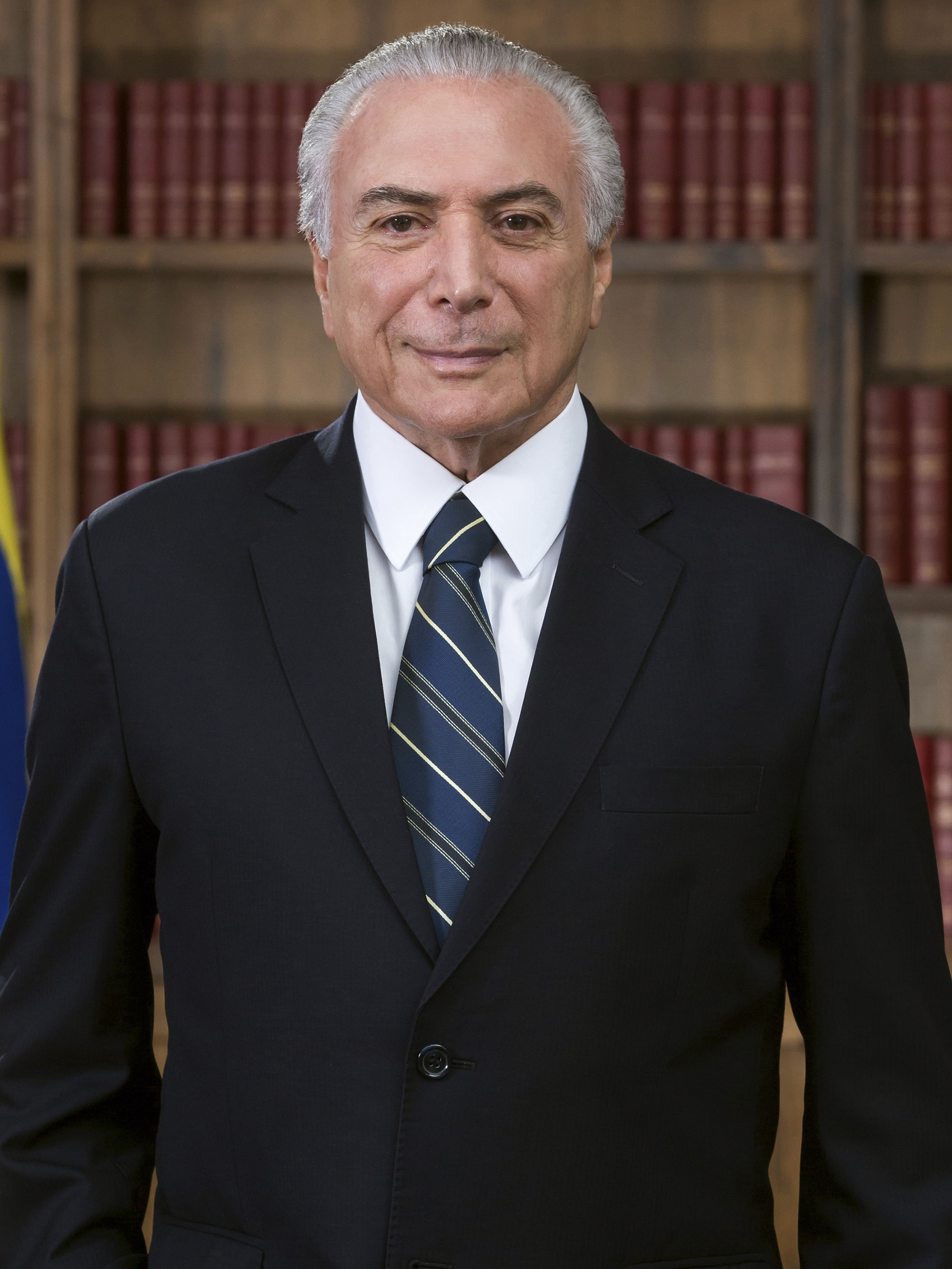

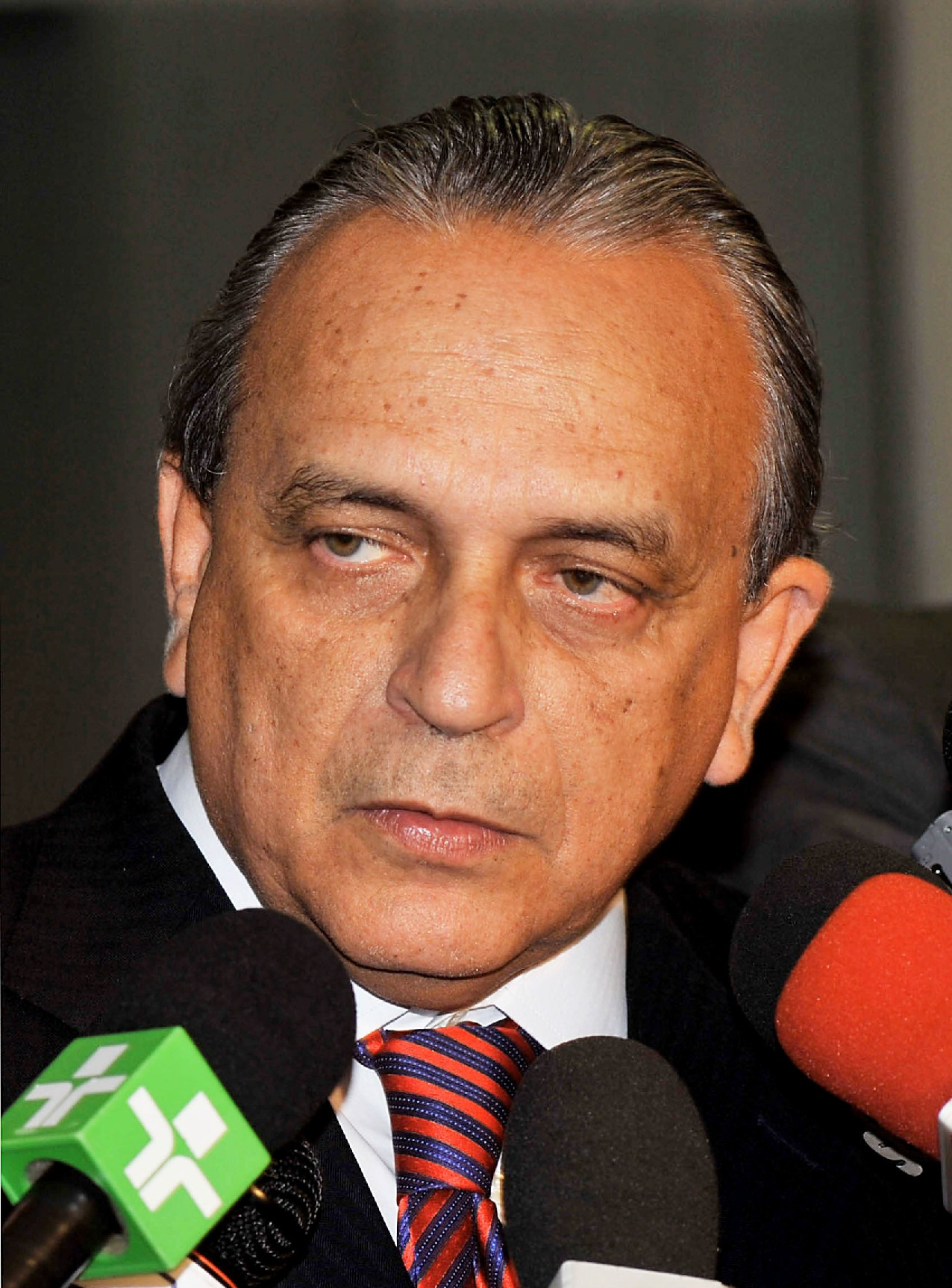
| | Majority party | Minority party | Third party |
|---|---|---|---|
| Leader | Ricardo Berzoini | Michel Temer | Sérgio Guerra |
| Party | PT | MDB | PSDB |
| Last election | 411 mayors | 1,059 mayors | 870 mayors |
| Seats won | 557 | 1,202 | 791 |
| Seat change | ▲146 | ▲143 | ▼79 |
| Popular vote | 16,468,094 | 18,491,822 | 14,537,570 |

Municipal elections were held in Brazil on October 5 and October 26, 2008. Over 130 million voters chose mayors and city councillors for the 5,565 municipalities of Brazil.

Brazilian law allowed candidates to run under ballot names different from their legal names. At least six candidates chose the ballot name Barack Obama and some entrepreneurs used ballot names that make reference to their business.

== Mayoral elections results ==
| Municipality | Result | Winner party |
|---|---|---|
| Aracaju (SE) | Edvaldo Nogueira re-elected | PCdoB |
| Belford Roxo (RJ) | Alcides Rolim elected | PT |
| Belo Horizonte (MG) | Run-off between Márcio Lacerda and Leonardo Quintão | PSB and PMDB |
| Blumenau (SC) | João Paulo Kleinübing re-elected | DEM |
| Campina Grande (PB) | Run-off between Veneziano and Rômulo Gouveia | PMDB and PSDB |
| Campinas (SP) | Hélio de Oliveira Santos re-elected | PDT |
| Campo Grande (MS) | Nelsinho Trad re-elected | PMDB |
| Campos (RJ) | Rosinha Garotinho elected | PMDB |
| Caxias do Sul (RS) | José Ivo Sartori re-elected | PMDB |
| Cuiabá (MT) | Run-off between Wilson Santos and Mauro Mendes | PSDB and PR |
| Curitiba (PR) | Beto Richa re-elected | PSDB |
| Duque de Caxias (RJ) | Zito elected | PSDB |
| Florianópolis (SC) | Run-off between Dário Berger and Esperidião Amin | PMDB and PP |
| Franca (SP) | Sidnei Rocha re-elected | PSDB |
| Goiânia (GO) | Íris Resende re-elected | PMDB |
| Fortaleza (CE) | Luizianne Lins re-elected | PT |
| Jaboatão dos Guararapes (PE) | Elias Gomes elected | PSDB |
| João Pessoa (PB) | Ricardo Coutinho re-elected | PSB |
| Joinville (SC) | Run-off between Carlito Merss and Darci de Matos | PT and DEM |
| Juiz de Fora (MG) | Run-off between Margarida and Custódio Mattos | PT and PSDB |
| Londrina (PR) | Run-off between Antonio Belinati and Hauly | PP and PSDB |
| Macapá (AM) | Run-off between Camilo Capiberibe and Roberto Góes | PSB and PDT |
| Maceió (AL) | Cícero Almeida re-elected | PP |
| Manaus (AM) | Run-off between Amazonino Mendes and Serafim Correa | PTB and PSB |
| Maringá (PR) | Sílvio Barros re-elected | PP |
| Natal (RN) | Micarla de Sousa elected | PV |
| Niterói (RJ) | Jorge Roberto Silveira elected | PDT |
| Olinda (PE) | Renildo Calheiros elected | PC do B |
| Pelotas (RS) | Run-off between Fernando Marroni and Fetter Junior | PT and PP |
| Petrópolis (RJ) | Run-off between Paulo Mustrangi and Ronaldo Medeiros | PT and PSB |
| Piracicaba (SP) | Barjas Negri re-elected | PSDB |
| Ponta Grossa (PR) | Run-off between Wosgrau and Sandro Alex | PSDB and PPS |
| Porto Alegre (RS) | Run-off between José Fogaça and Maria do Rosário | PMDB and PT |
| Porto Velho (RO) | Roberto Sobrinho re-elected | PT |
| Recife (PE) | João da Costa elected | PT |
| Ribeirão Preto (SP) | Dárcy Vera elected | DEM |
| Rio Branco (AC) | Raimundo Angelim re-elected | PT |
| Rio de Janeiro (RJ) | Run-off between Eduardo Paes and Fernando Gabeira | PMDB and PV |
| Salvador (BA) | Run-off between João Henrique and Walter Pinheiro | PMDB and PT |
| São Bernardo do Campo (SP) | Run-off between Luiz Marinho and Orlando Morando | PT and PSDB |
| São Gonçalo (RJ) | Aparecida Panisset re-elected | PDT |
| São José (SC) | Djalma Berger elected | PSB |
| São Luís (MA) | Run-off between João Castelo and Flávio Dino | PSDB and PC do B |
| São Paulo (SP) | Run-off between Gilberto Kassab and Marta Suplicy | DEM and PT |
| Teresina (PI) | Sílvio Mendes re-elected | PSDB |
| Uberaba (MG) | Anderson Adauto re-elected | PMDB |
| Uberlândia (MG) | Odelmo Leão re-elected | PP |
| Vitória (ES) | João Coser re-elected | PT |
| Volta Redonda (RJ) | Antônio Francisco Neto elected | PMDB |
