= Emília Belinati =

Brazilian politician

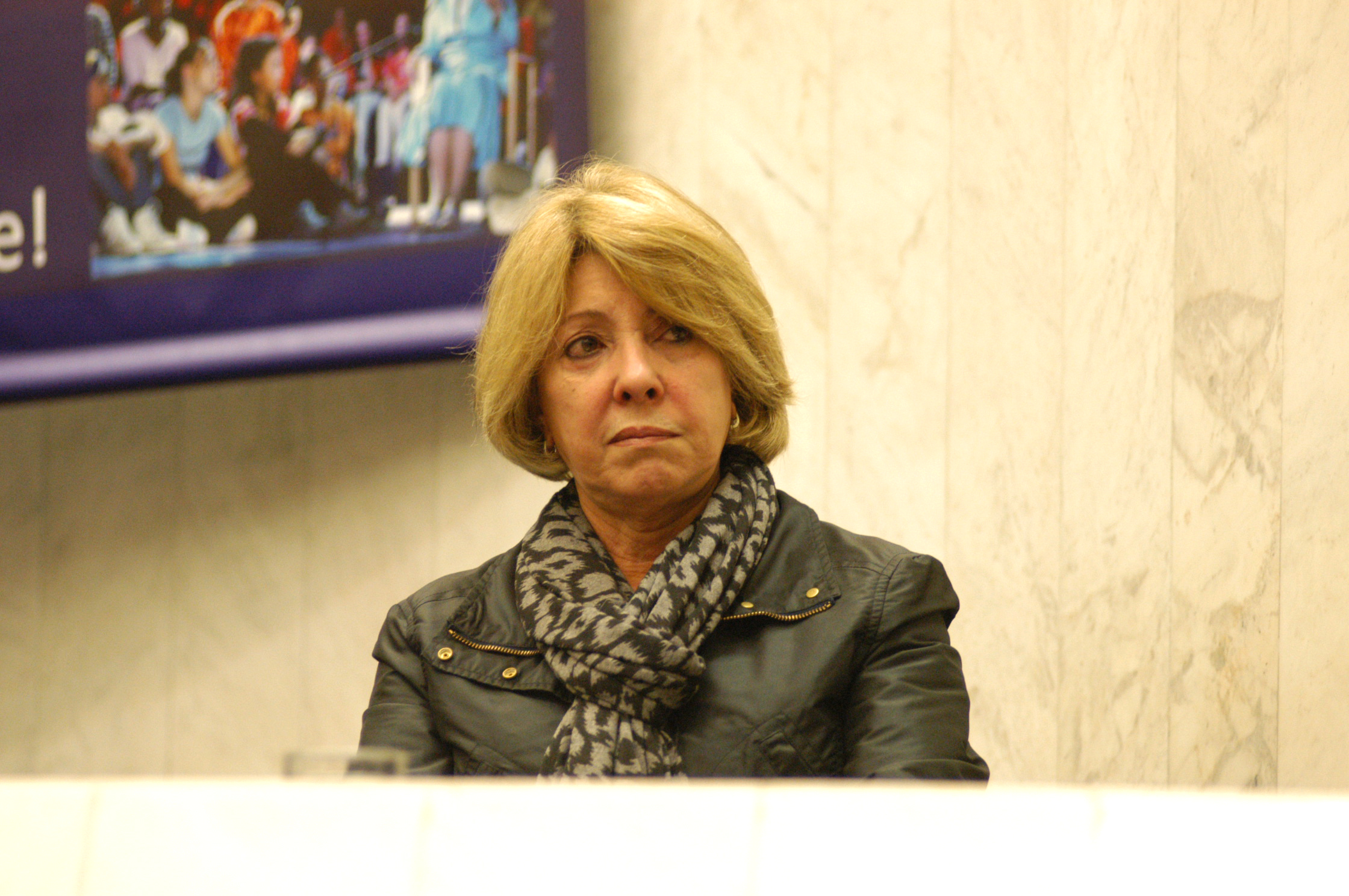

Vice Governor of Paraná
- In office 1 January 1995 – 1 January 2003
- Governor: Jaime Lerner
- Preceded by: Mário Pereira
- Succeeded by: Orlando Pessuti

State deputy for Paraná
- In office 1 February 1991 – 1 January 1995

Personal details
- Born: 29 May 1945 (age 80) Londrina, Paraná, Brazil
- Party: PTB; PSB (before 2006); PFL (2006–2010); PSB (2010–present)
- Spouse: Antonio Belinati (separated)
- Children: 3

Emília de Sales Belinati (born 29 May 1945) is a Brazilian teacher and politician affiliated with the Brazilian Socialist Party (PSB). She was a state deputy in the state of Paraná, and later became the vice-governor of the state between 1995 and 2003, with Jaime Lerner as governor. She also served as the director of Sanepar. She was the only female deputy in the state legislature during her time as deputy, from 1991 to 1995, and was the first female vice-governor of the state.

== Personal life and education ==
Belinati was born on 29 May 1945 in Londrina, and is the child of Maria Cândida and Sebastião Sales. In 1974, she graduated with a degree in physical education from the Faculdade de Educação Física e Desportos do Norte do Paraná, which is now the Universidade Norte do Paraná (Unopar). She was one of the players on the Paraná state basketball team. She taught at municipal and state schools for 10 years.

She was married to former Londrina mayor Antonio Belinati, with whom she had three children, including former state deputy Antonio Carlos Belinati. Emília separated from Antonio, who had been involved in various scandals, including being removed from his position as mayor of Londrina.

== Political career ==
In 1977, Belinati was named president of the Association of the Protection of Maternity and Infancy of Londrina. In 1989, she led the Paraná Volunteering Program's operations in Londrina. During the 1990 elections, she became a state deputy, becoming the lone female deputy in the state from 1991 to 1995. An Evangelical, she launched a campaign against the death penalty in the state of Paraná.

During the 1994 Paraná state elections, Belinati, as a member of the Democratic Labour Party (PDT), formed a ticket with Jaime Lerner, who was also with the PDT to run for state government. They were elected, defeating the ticket led by Álvaro Dias (PP) and Maurício Fruet (PMDB). Lerner and Belinati were reelected in 1998, this time defeating Roberto Requião of the PMDB. In Lerner's absence, Belinati would assume a temporary role as governor 45 times. During her time as vice-governor, in 1998, she was the subject of a public civil lawsuit, along with 38 other people, having been suspected of embezzling funds from the municipality of Londrina.

During the 2006 elections, Belinati was a candidate for federal deputy as part of the Liberal Front Party (PFL), but was not elected. In 2007, she was named the director of the Curitiba Institute of Health by then-mayor Beto Richa. She stayed with the institution until 2010. In the 2010 elections, she became a candidate for the PSB again as a state deputy, but again was not elected. In 2013, she was elected to lead Sanepar in place of her son Antonio Carlos Belinati.
