= Maria Lynch =

Brazilian artist

Maria Lynch (Rio de Janeiro, born 1981) is a Brazilian artist

== Education ==
In 2008, she earned an MA and a Post-Graduate Diploma from Chelsea College of Art and Design in London.

== Work ==
Maria Lynch works with a variety of media, including painting, sculpture / installations, performance and videos, in works which address excess in dealing with the female figure and the world of play. She creates a language that unfurls from fragments of memory and the abstraction of reality.

Among her main collective exhibitions are "The Jerwood Drawing Prize" London, 2008; "Nova Arte Nova" at CCBB, Rio de Janeiro and São Paulo, 2008. In 2009 she was invited to the "Salão Paranaense", Curitiba and presented the performance "Incorporáveis" at Oi Futuro and SESC 24 Horas, Pier Maua, Rio de Janeiro. In 2010, she was invited to the collective exhibition "] entre [" in the Galeria IBEU and won the Marcantônio Vilaça Prize, Funarte with exhibition at the MAC Niteroi. In the same year she was invited to the 6th Biennial of Curitiba, VentoSul. Maria also participated in the exhibition at the Barbican "Creative Cities" London Olympics, 2012 and also the exhibition "Bordalianos do Brasil" at the Calouste Gulbenkian Foundation in Lisbon, Portugal.

Among her most recent solo exhibitions are "Ocupação Macia" at the New Museum in 2015, which Maria had previously shown in an individual at Paço Imperial, Rio de Janeiro in 2012. "Aforismas, Rizomas e Selvageria", Anita Schwartz, Rio de Janeiro, Brazil 2015. "Janela Provisória", O grande Campo - Oi Futuro, Rio de Janeiro, Brazil 2015. "Time is Never Past Nor Present", curated by Sarah Crown at Spazio522, New York, USA 2014 and "Becomings" - Bathroom Project, Rooster Gallery, New York, USA 2014.

In 2014 was commissioned to the artist to do a work for the Getúlio Vargas Foundation in the new building of Oscar Niemeyer. In that year she released her book by Cosac Naif, entitled "Drawings". In 2014 she did an artistic residence at Residency Unlimited in New York. In the same year she won an award from the Brazilian Consulate in the US for the solo exhibition, "Ocupação Macia" who took place at the Ideas City Festival in New Museum, New York. She also presented a solo exhibition in the gallery Anita Schwartz, Rio de Janeiro, titled "Aforismas, Rizomas e Selvageria". In the year 2016 she did a solo exhibition called "Spaces and Spectacles" at Wilding Cran Gallery in Los Angeles. Maria Lynch began the year 2017 by opening her first solo exhibition at an institution in Brazil, titled "Máquina Devir" at Oi Futuro, Rio de Janeiro, Brazil.

The artist has works in important collections such as the Museum of Contemporary Art, Niterói, Brazil; Centro Cultural Candido Mendes, Rio de Janeiro, Brazil; Fine Arts Olympic Committee, London, United Kingdom; Gilberto Chateubriand Collection, Brazil / MAM-RJ, Rio de Janeiro, Brazil; Ministry of Foreign Affairs - Itamaraty Palace, DF, Brazil and Getúlio Vargas Foundation, Rio de Janeiro, Brazil.

Selected solo exhibitions

- 2017 Máquina Devir; Oi Futuro, RJ, Brazil
- 2016 Spaces and Spetacles; Wilding and Cran Gallery; LA, USA
- 2016 Ficções Sensoriais; Blau Projects, SP, Brazil
- 2015 Janela Provisória, O grande Campo; Oi Futuro Rio de Janeiro, Brazil
- 2015 Ocupação Macia; Storefront For Art and Architecture at Ideas City Festival - New Museum, NY, USA
- 2015 Aforismas, Rizomas e Selvageria; Anita Schwartz, Rio de Janeiro, Brazil
- 2014 Time is Never Past Nor Present; Curated by Sarah Crown Spazio522, NY, USA
- 2014 Becomings - Bathroom Project; Rooster Gallery, NY, USA
- 2014 Roda Viva; Galeria Roberto Alban, Salvador, Brazil
- 2013 Acontecimento Encarnado; Curated by Ligia Canongia, Galeria Anita Schwartz, Rio de Janeiro, Brazil
- 2013 Ocupação Macia, Galeria Murilo Castro, BH, Brazil
- 2012 Orgão sem Corpo, Galeria Marília Razuk, São Paulo, Brazil
- 2012 Ocupação Macia, Paço Imperial, Rio de Janeiro, Brazil
- 2012 Incorporáveis (performance), Museum of Modern Art, Rio de Janeiro, Brazil
- 2010 W4, Galeria HAP, Rio de Janeiro, Brazil
- 2009 Devirneando, Galeria Mercedes Viegas, Rio de Janeiro, Brazil
- 2006 Retalhos, Galeria Candido Mendes, Rio de Janeiro, Brazil
- 2005 Immanência, Galeria Tarsila do Amaral, Rio de Janeiro, Brazil

Selected group exhibitions

- 2014 Immediate Female; Judith Charles Gallery, NY, USA
- 2014 Cake, Dolls, Gift Bags and Other things; Radiator Gallery, NY, USA
- 2014 The Playground Of The Fantastical; Galerie Protégé, NY, USA
- 2014 This Exhibition Has Every Thing To Go Wrong; Abrons Center, NY, USA
- 2013 Bordalianos do Brasil; Fundação Calouste Gulbenkian, Lisbon, Portugal
- 2013 Aproximações Contemporâneas; Roberto Alban Galeria, Salvador, Brazil
- 2013 Videoarte 2013; Oi Futuro, Rio de Janeiro, Brazil
- 2012 Algum de Nós; Galeria Marília Razuk, São Paulo, Brazil
- 2012 Somatório Singular; Curated by Cristina Burlamaqui, Galeria Murilo Castro, BH, Brazil
- 2011 Bienal Vento Sul; Curated by Alfons Hug curadoria de 6º Bienal de Curitiba, Curitiba, Brazil
- 2011 Incorporáveis; SP Arte, Pavilhão da Bienal, São Paulo, Brazil
- 2011 Zona Oculta; SESC and Centro Cultural Justiça Eleitoral, Rio de Janeiro, Brazil
- 2011 Black Tie; Galeria BNDES, Rio de Janeiro, Brazil
- 2011 Esculturas Flutuantes; Tocayo, Galpão da Arte e Cidadania, Rio de Janeiro, Brazil
- 2010 Incorporáveis (video); Presente Futuro Vol III, Oi Futuro, Rio de Janeiro, Brazil
- 2010 Arquivo Geral; Curated by Paulo Venâncio Centro Helio Oiticica, Rio de Janeiro, Brazil
- 2010 ] entre [ ; Galeria Ibeu, Rio de Janeiro, Brazil
- 2010 Incorporáveis (performance); SP Arte, Pavilhão da Bienal, São Paulo, Brazil
- 2010 Estranho Cotidiano; Galeria Movimento, Rio de Janeiro, Brazil
- 2010 Liberdade é Pouco. O que desejo ainda não tem nome; Curated by Bernardo Mosqueira, Casa no Jardim Botânico, Rio de Janeiro, Brazil
- 2010 Incorporáveis (performance); SESC Arte 24h, Espaço Píer Mauá, Rio de Janeiro, Brazil
- 2009 Incorporáveis (performance); Oi Futuro, Rio de Janeiro, Brazil
- 2009 Nova Arte Nova; Centro Cultural Banco do Brasil, São Paulo, Brazil
- 2008 Jerwood Drawing Prize; Jerwood Space, London, UK
- 2008 Master’s Degree Final Show; Chelsea College of Art & Design, London, UK
- 2008 Nova Arte Nova; Curated by Paulo Venâncio, Centro Cultural Banco do Brasil, RJ, Brazil
- 2008 59 Seconds Video Festival, Landmark, Bergen Kunsthall, Bergen, Norway; Schauraum, Nurtingen, Germany; Artprojx Space, London, UK; University of Texas, Austin, USA
- 2008 Condensation; Decima Gallery, London, UK
- 2008 Crouch End Open Studios; Town Hall, London, UK
- 2008 Collective Exhibition; Galeria Virgílio, São Paulo, Brazil
- 2008 Abre Alas 2008; A Gentil Carioca, Rio de Janeiro, Brazil
- 2007 Post-Graduate Final Show; Chelsea College of Art & Design, London, UK
- 2007 Inaugural show; Galeria do Convento, Universidade Candido Mendes, RJ, Brazil
- 2007 Group Exhibition – Salon Gallery, London, UK
- 2006 Arquivo Geral; Centro Helio Oiticica, Rio de Janeiro, Brazil
- 2006 Conexão Contemporânea; FUNARTE, Rio de Janeiro, Brazil
- 2005 Acessos Possíveis; Escola de Artes Visuais do Parque Lage, Rio de Janeiro, Brazil
- 2005 Evento Pirata (intervention on Rio-Niterói ferry), Grupo Py, Rio de Janeiro, Brazil
- 2005 Conexão Contemporânea; FUNARTE, Rio de Janeiro, Brazil

== Awards, residencies and grants ==
- 2016 ESXLA Residency Program LA, USA
- 2015 Grant for Solo Exhibition at Storefront for Art and Architecture by the Brazilian Embassy, NY, EUA
- 2013 Residencie at Residency Unlimited, NY, EUA
- 2013 Selecteted for a commission of Public Art, Fundação Getúlio Vargas, RJ, Brazil
- 2012 Guest artist by the London 2012 Organizing Committee, Creative Cities, Barbican, London, UK
- 2012 Residencie Bordalo Pinheiro, Lisbon, Portugal
- 2012 Front Commission of escola de Samba da Pimpolhos Grande Rio, Sapucai, Rio de Janeiro, Brasil
- 2010 Montáveis Sculpture Workshop, Casa França Brasil, Rio de Janeiro, Brazil
- 2010 Marcantonio Vilaça Award, Funarte, Brazil
- 2009 Guest artist, 63rd Salão Paranaense, Museum of Modern Art, Curitiba, PA, Brazil
- 2008 Jerwood Drawing Prize, Jerwood Space, London, UK
- 2007 13th Salão da Bahia, Bahia Museum of Modern Art, Salvador, Brazil
- 2006 Novíssimos, Galeria IBEU Copacabana, Rio de Janeiro, Brazil
- 2006 Salão de Arte de Ribeirão Preto, MARP, Ribeirão Preto, Brazil
- 2004 Arte Pará, Rômulo Maiorana Foundation, Belém, Brazil

== Public collections ==
- Ministério das Relações Exteriores, Palácio do Itamaraty, DF, Brazil
- Coleção Gilberto Chateaubriand, MAM, Rio de Janeiro, Brazil
- Centro Cultural Candido Mendes, Rio de Janeiro, Brazil
- Museu de Arte Contemporânea de Niterói, Niterói, Brazil
- Committee for Olympic Fine Arts 2012, London, UK
- BGA collection (Investment Fund), Brazil
