= Antonio Belinati =

Brazilian politician

Mayor of Londrina
- In office 1997 – 26 May 2000
- Preceded by: Luiz Eduardo Cheida
- Succeeded by: Jorge Scaff
- In office 1989–1992
- Preceded by: Wilson Rodrigues Moreira
- Succeeded by: Luiz Eduardo Cheida
- In office 1977–1982
- Preceded by: José Richa
- Succeeded by: José Antonio Del Ciel

Personal details
- Born: Antonio Casemiro Belinati; 25 October 1943 (age 82) Campo Grande, Mato Grosso (now Mato Grosso do Sul), Brazil
- Political party: PP
- Spouse: Emília Belinati (separated)
- Children: 3
- Relatives: Marcelo Belinati (nephew)

Antonio Casemiro Belinati (born 25 October 1943) is a Brazilian radio personality and politician, currently affiliated with the Progressistas (PP). He has been the mayor of the city of Londrina at various points, starting in the late 1970s. His former wife is former vice-governor of the state of Paraná, Emília Belinati, and their son is former state deputy and head of Sanepar Antonio Carlos Belinati. His nephew is current mayor of Londrina Marcelo Belinati.

== Biography ==
Belinati began his career as an announcer on radio programs on Rádio Londrina in the 1960s, in particular for programs hosted by Otássio Pereira. He became a reporter and host of the program A Voz do Povo. In 1963, he was the first presenter on TV Coroados, leading, for 20 years, the Telenotícias Transparaná program. He was married to Emília Belinati, with whom they three children.

He lost the elections for mayor of Londrina in 2004, losing the seat in the second round to Nedson Luiz Micheleti (PT), with Micheleti obtaining 137,928 votes (53.25%) to Belinati's 121,102 votes (46.75%).

During the 2008 municipal elections, while affiliated with the Progressistas, was allowed to run his campaign after the Superior Electoral Court (TSE) closed a petition of impugnation from a regional court (TRE). He advanced to the second round against Luiz Carlos Hauly (PSDB) and won with 51.73% versus Hauly's 48.27%. Afterwards, after consideration from the Public Electoral Ministry, he was deemed unelectable due to financial provisions from his third mandate being rejected by Londrina's municipal chamber and by the Tribunal de Contas of Paraná. During the chamber's session on 28 October 2008, the TSE, while on appeal, rectified the injunction maintaining the TRE's position. With this, the TSE impugned Belinati's candidacy, and thus annulling his victory. Afterwards, in a redone election, Homero Barbosa Neto won.

== Mayor of Londrina ==
During his first term from 1977 to 1982, his administration helped to build sidewalks and, through national housing programs, more than 20,000 units were built, giving rise to the phrase "Cinco Conjuntos". The Service of Telephonic Communications (SERCOMTEL) was broadened, and 33% of this was applied to education. To address issues with sanitation, 8 new health outposts were built and 3 were renovated. His administration also created ACESF, the Cemetery and Funeral Services Administration of Londrina, and completed the Via Expressa project, started by the previous administration. His administration expropriated and forced the residents out of the neighborhood of Vila Matos and to begin the construction of the current Terminal Rodoviário de Londrina. The railroad in the center of the city was removed and the new route was inaugurated by then president João Figueiredo. The land made available by the removal of the railroad was used by the following administration for the construction of the Via Leste-Oeste.

His second term, from 1989 to 1992, sought to improve the people of Londrina's health. More than 40 new health outposts were installed, among them a daycare in the downtown area with modern structures, a 24-hour medical center, along with a maternity ward with free assistance for women going into labor. During this time, his administration built Sem Terra, a satellite city, with pieces of land donated by the municipality to people in need. The Autódromo Internacional de Londrina was built, and his administration also carried out the implementation of the Transporte Emergencial Centralizado (TEC) plan.

Belinati was elected for a third term, from 1997 to 2000. This term brought the arrival of companies such as Dixie Toga, Atlas Villares and Caninha Oncinha to Londrina. He created the first Municipal Secretary of the Elderly in Brazil. He also created the "Londrina Convention & Visitors Bureau", to make the most potential towards bringing in touristic events to the city. His administration also build nearly 2,000 ramps for sidewalks, making access easier to those with physical disabilities. His administration also constructed the Pronto Atendimento Infantil. He was expelled from the PFL.

After Belinati was removed from office, Jorge Scaff assumed the position on 26 May 2000, and was later elected indirectly on 14 July 2000. Belinati returned to his radio program in 2001.

== Imprisonment ==
Belinati was imprisoned for administrative impropriety by the Ministry of Justice, a decision taken as a result of legal action taken by the Public Ministry (MP) in 2000. The case alleged that Belinati and twelve other defendants devised a scheme of fictitious contracts by the Municipal Authority of the Environment (AMA) for the purchase of supplies such as trashcans, metal frame benches and bags of whitewash in 1999. These items were never delivered. At that time, to abide by the decision, the authority paid 212,479 reais for the goods. According the Justice ministry, the value was laundered and sent to cover the expenses of electoral campaigns for those allied with Belinati.

According to the sentencing, Belinati "organized and led a true gang into the municipal administration building", and that "under his leadership, public agents, in collusion with private individuals, harmed the public treasury by stealing a large sum of money." The value, later fixed by the INPC/IBGE from April 1999 to May 2014, resulted in 570,248 reais, as the Justice Ministry's decision read.

In 2019, Belinati was again imprisoned, again for administrative impropriety in relation to the case against Ama/Comurb. The Public Ministry of Paraná reaffirmed that with this case, they investigated the occurrence of a false bidding process in September 1998. According to the decision, the group laundered more than 148,000 reais that should have been used for investments in the municipality.
