= Anne Perera =

Sri Lankan New Zealand food scientist

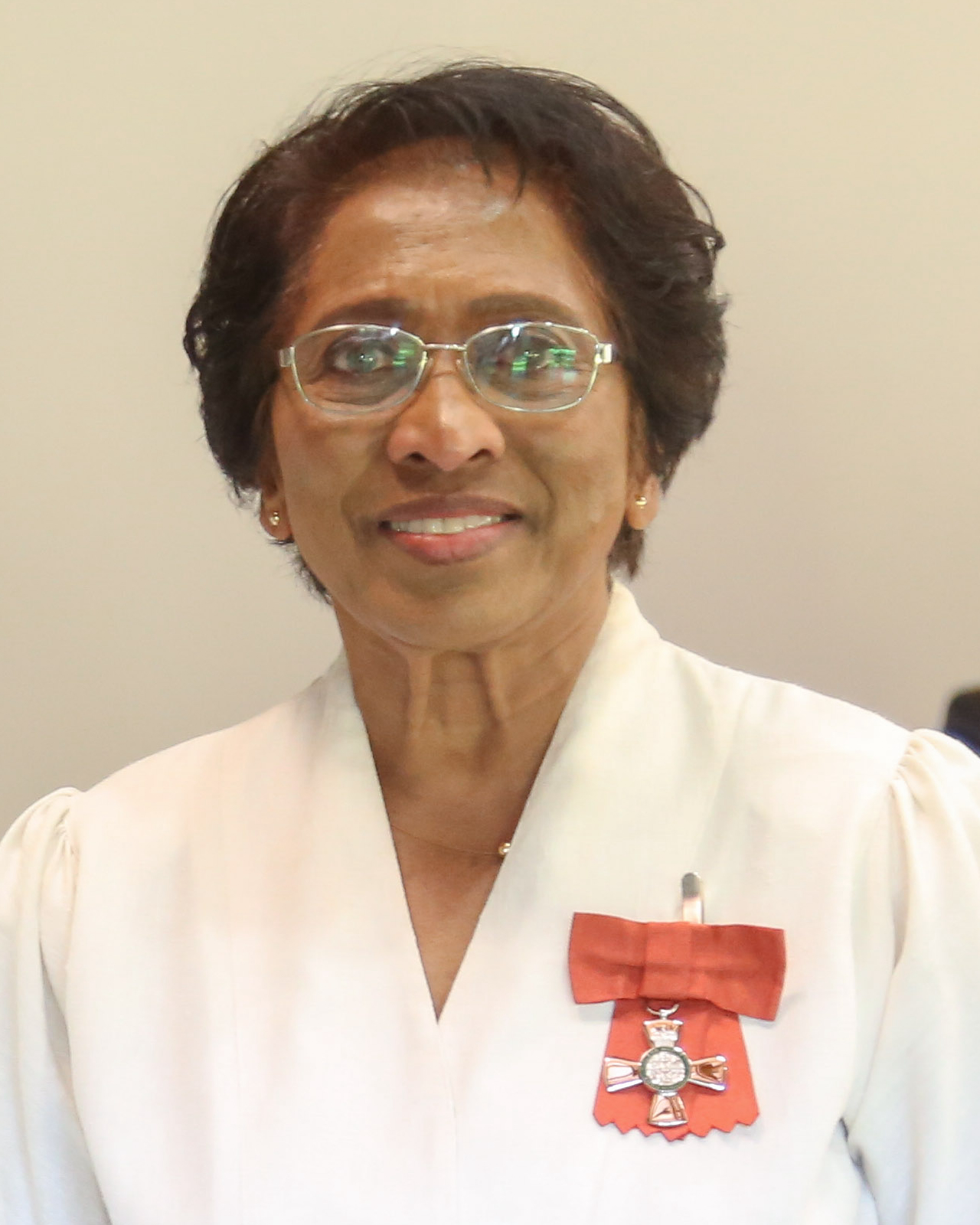
- Born: Moratuwa
- Awards: Member of the New Zealand Order of Merit

Academic background
- Education: Oregon State University, University of Peradeniya, Holy Family Convent, Bambalapitiya
- Thesis: Vitamin B_{6} enrichment of wheat flour: stability and bioavailability (1977)

Anne Doloras Perera MNZM is a Sri Lankan–New Zealand food scientist and author. She was awarded the New Zealand Institute of Food Science and Technology's J. C. Andrews Award in 2022. In 2024 Perera was appointed a Member of the New Zealand Order of Merit, for services to food science and nutrition.

== Early life and education ==
Perera is from Moratuwa in Sri Lanka. She attended school at the Our Lady of Victories convent, and then at the Holy Family Convent in Bamblapitiya. Perera studied agriculture at the University of Peradeniya, earning a Bachelor with Honours, and then received a Food and Agriculture Organisation scholarship to undertake a master's degree at the International Food Technology Training Centre in India, where she met her husband, Conrad Perera, also a food technologist.

Perera completed a PhD titled Vitamin B_{6} enrichment of wheat flour: stability and bioavailability at the Oregon State University. She has also completed an Executive MBA at Massey University, and a diploma of psychology obtained when she was working in Singapore.

== Research career ==
After graduating with her PhD in 1977, Perera then joined the faculty of the State University of Londrina in Brazil, where she worked for four years. In 1981, the family moved to New Zealand, where Perera worked as a nutrition specialist for Hansels, as research and development manager for frozen food at Wattie's, and the Team Leader for Nutrition and Health at Crop and Food Research. Perera was part of the team that designed food science courses at the University of Auckland.

Perera retired in 2010. After her retirement, she volunteered for Volunteer Service Abroad, working in Tanzania to advise on food and nutrition and small food businesses. She also helped rebrand the Tanzania Association of Food Scientists and Technologists.

== Honours and awards ==
Perera co-authored a book, Nutrition 2000, with Auckland food writer Pip Duncan, which was awarded the New Zealand Guild of Food Writers' Nutrition Writer of the Year award in 1994.

In the 2024 New Year's Honours, Perera was appointed a Member of the Order of New Zealand, for services to food science and nutrition.

The New Zealand Institute of Food Science and Technology awarded Perera the J. C. Andrews Award in 2022, their most prestigious award.

== Selected works ==
- Perera, Anne Doloras; Sanmugam, Devagi; Lister, Carolyn; Hedges, Lesley (2007). Hot potatoes & cool bananas: healthy food, what, why & how. Singapore: SNP Editions. ISBN 9789812481108.
- Duncan, Pip; Perera, Anne (1994). Nutrition 2000. Longman Paul. ISBN 9780582860704.
- Perera, Anne (2010). Thank You for Being My Father. A. Perera, New Zealand. ISBN 9780473168483.
