= Rodrigo Neves =

Brazilian politician (born 1976)

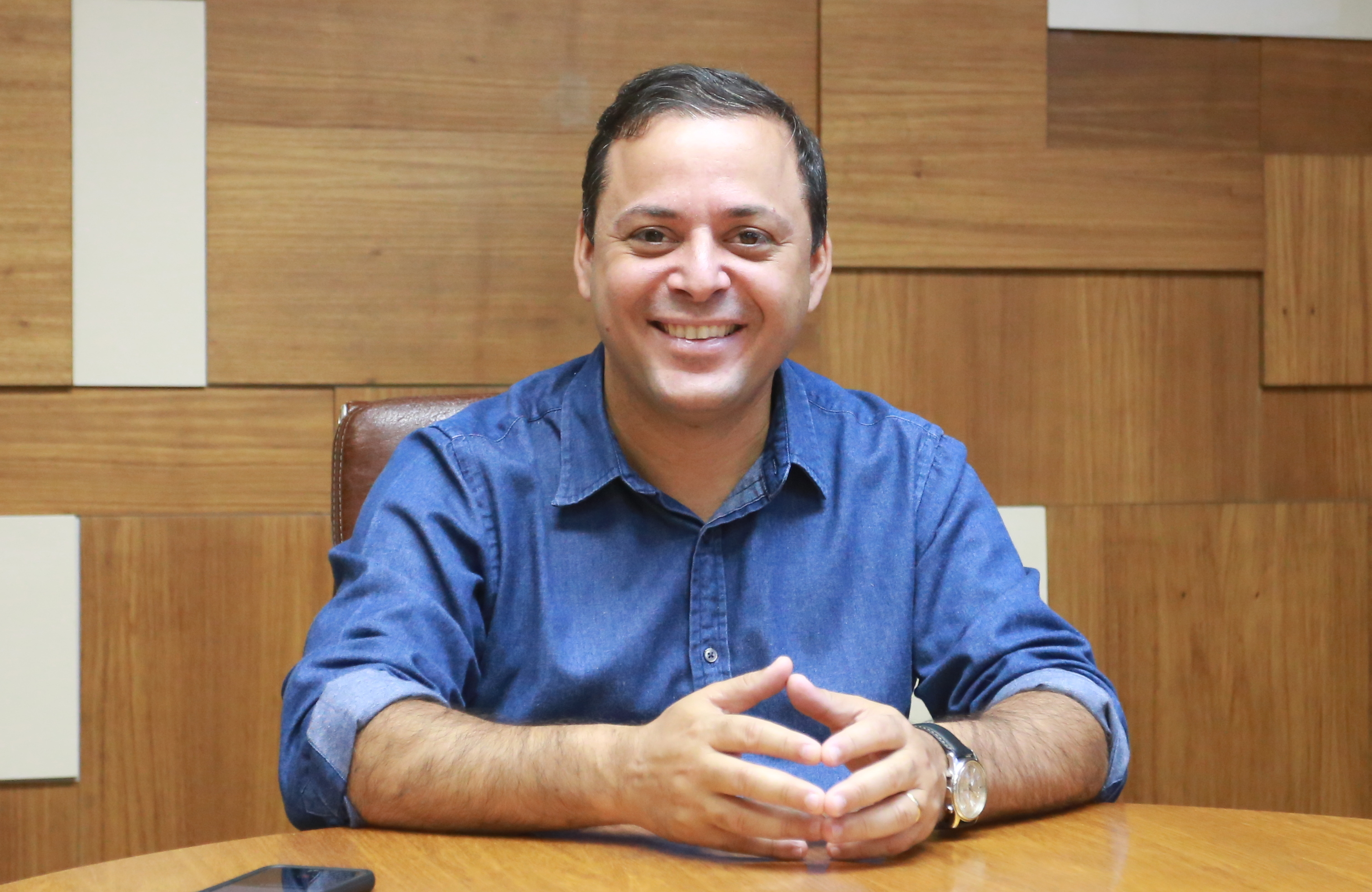

Mayor of Niterói
- Incumbent
- Assumed office 1 January 2025
- Vice-mayor: Isabel Swan
- Preceded by: Axel Grael
- In office 1 January 2013 – 1 January 2021
- Preceded by: Jorge Roberto Silveira
- Succeeded by: Axel Grael

Executive Secretary of the City of Niterói
- In office 1 January 2023 – 1 January 2025
- Preceded by: Bira Marques

State deputy for Rio de Janeiro
- In office 1 January 2007 – 31 December 2012

Councilman of Niterói
- In office April 1998 – 31 January 2007

Personal details
- Born: Rodrigo Neves Barreto; 28 June 1976 (age 50) São Gonçalo, Rio de Janeiro, Brazil
- Party: PT (1996–2016); PV (2016–2017); PDT (2017–present)
- Children: 3
- Education: Fluminense Federal University

Rodrigo Neves Barreto (born 28 June 1976) is a Brazilian politician affiliated with the Democratic Labour Party (PDT). He has been the mayor of Niterói since 2025, having previously served from 2013 to 2021. He was also the executive secretary for the city and a city councilor from 1998 to 2007. He also served as a state deputy in Rio de Janeiro and as state secretary of Social Assistance.

== Biography ==
=== Early life ===
Neves was born in 1976 in São Gonçalo. He graduated with a degree in social sciences from Fluminense Federal University in Niterói. During this time he became affiliated with the Secondary School Students Union of Niterói (UNES), where he defended demands such as free transportation passes for students, and was the leader of the movement for a strengthening of political ethics that became known as the "caras pintadas" movement in Niterói.

He is married and has three children.

=== Political career ===
First affiliated with the Workers' Party (PT), Neves was a councilman in Niterói beginning in April 1998, assuming the position as a substitute to João Batista Petersen Mendes, who died that year. He was reelected for the 2005–2008 term with 6,086 votes, being the most voted for in that election. In 2006, he became a candidate for state deputy, being elected with 41,288 votes. He was a candidate for mayor in Niterói for the first time in 2008, reaching second position, losing to the PDT candidate, former mayor Jorge Roberto Silveira. He was reelected in 2010 with 38,856 votes. In 2011, Neves became the state secretary of Social Assistance and Human Rights, and was reelected as mayor in 2012 with 132,001 (52.55%) votes, defeating Felipe Peixoto of the PDT in the runoff.

In 2015, he left the PT and then affiliated himself with the Green Party (PV) in anticipation for the 2016 election, winning reelection as mayor in a rematch against Felipe Peixoto (PSB) and state deputy Flavio Serafini (PSOL). He was reelected with 130,473 votes in the second round. On 6 May 2017, Neves inaugurated the Charitas-Cafubá tunnel that connects the South Zone of the Oceanic Region of Niterói. Considered a project of great importance for urban mobility in the region, the tunnel took approximately a year and 6 months to complete. At the end of 2017, he again left the PV and subsequently affiliated with the PDT to assume a position with the coordinating campaign of Ciro Gomes for his 2018 presidential run.

In October 2020, two months after the end of his term, Neves received a prize of recognition by the United Nations, Congresso Smart City and Fira de Barcelona for his role in the city of Niterói's response to the COVID-19 pandemic.

On 23 July 2022, Neves officially became the PDT candidate for the gubernatorial election in Rio de Janeiro that year, with the former president of the Order of Attorneys of Brazil Felipe Santa Cruz as his vice-governor pick. Together they formed the electoral ticket consisting of the PDT, Social Democratic Party, Patriota and Agir, also receiving informal support from Cidadania despite their official support for Marcelo Freixo. Neves also received independent endorsements from various leaders of the PT, PSB, PCdoB, and Solidariedade.

Neves came in third place in the election, with 672,291 votes (8%). Niterói was the only city in the state where the winning candidate Cláudio Castro (PL) did not win, losing in a close race to Neves. In the second round of the general elections that year, he coordinated the presidential campaign of Luiz Inácio Lula da Silva (PT) in Niterói, which came to be the lone city in the Greater Rio de Janeiro area where Lula won over the incumbent president, Jair Bolsonaro (PL).

In January 2023, Neves was tapped by current mayor Axel Grael to become executive secretary of the city of Niterói, a position that Grael exercised during Neves' second term as mayor.

=== Allegations of corruption ===
In April 2014, the Public Accounts court of Rio de Janeiro state fined Neves for irregularities in the aiding of flood victims as state secretary in April 2010. He was penalized for failure in aid and in supervision of the allocation of public goods with the Morar Seguro program between August and December 2011.

On 10 December 2018, Neves was arrested as part of Operação Alameda due to corruption accusations and the creation of organized crime groups in a supposed scheme that would involve bribery payments by business owners from the transport industry and public agents from the city. The complaint made by the Public Ministry of the State of Rio de Janeiro (MP-RJ) alleged that between 2014 and 2018 there would have been approximately $10.9 million reais diverted from public coffers made towards illegal payments. The complaint was an outgrowth of Operation Car Wash investigations in the state, where the MPF-RJ shared the denunciations from business owners and defendant Marcelo Traça, ex-president of transport administration agency Fetranspor, who made the confession, and for proof authorized by the courts.

On 12 March 2019, the state criminal court (TJERJ) granted habeas corpus to Neves and 4 other accused individuals, though with precautionary measures, such as not being able to leave the state of Rio de Janeiro or Brazil, the confiscation of their passports and the prohibiting of contact between the accused or with witnesses listed by the Public Prosecutor's Office. They also could not leave the city of Niterói for more than 8 days without the explicit consent of the judge. Subsequently, on 13 March 2019, Neves was released to reassume the position as mayor. Neves reasserted his innocence and alleged that at the time he did not have the chance to defend himself. The charges were dropped by the court in July 2022 for lack of evidence.

In December 2020, the Public Prosecutor's Office (MPF) filed a complaint against Neves and 8 other people for corruption and defrauding the city's procurement program. The lawsuit, brought to a regional court, detailed 2 criminal schemes that began in 2013: for the aforementioned corruption and fraudulent charges (in the public record and with BRT Transoceânica) and with individual payments to judges at the Public Accounts Court of the State of Rio de Janeiro (TCE/RJ). According to the court, audits identified irregularities with the purchases and additional contracts. For these, he and the other defendants were ordered to pay $60 million reais in damages into public coffers.
