= Tamarana =

- Municipality
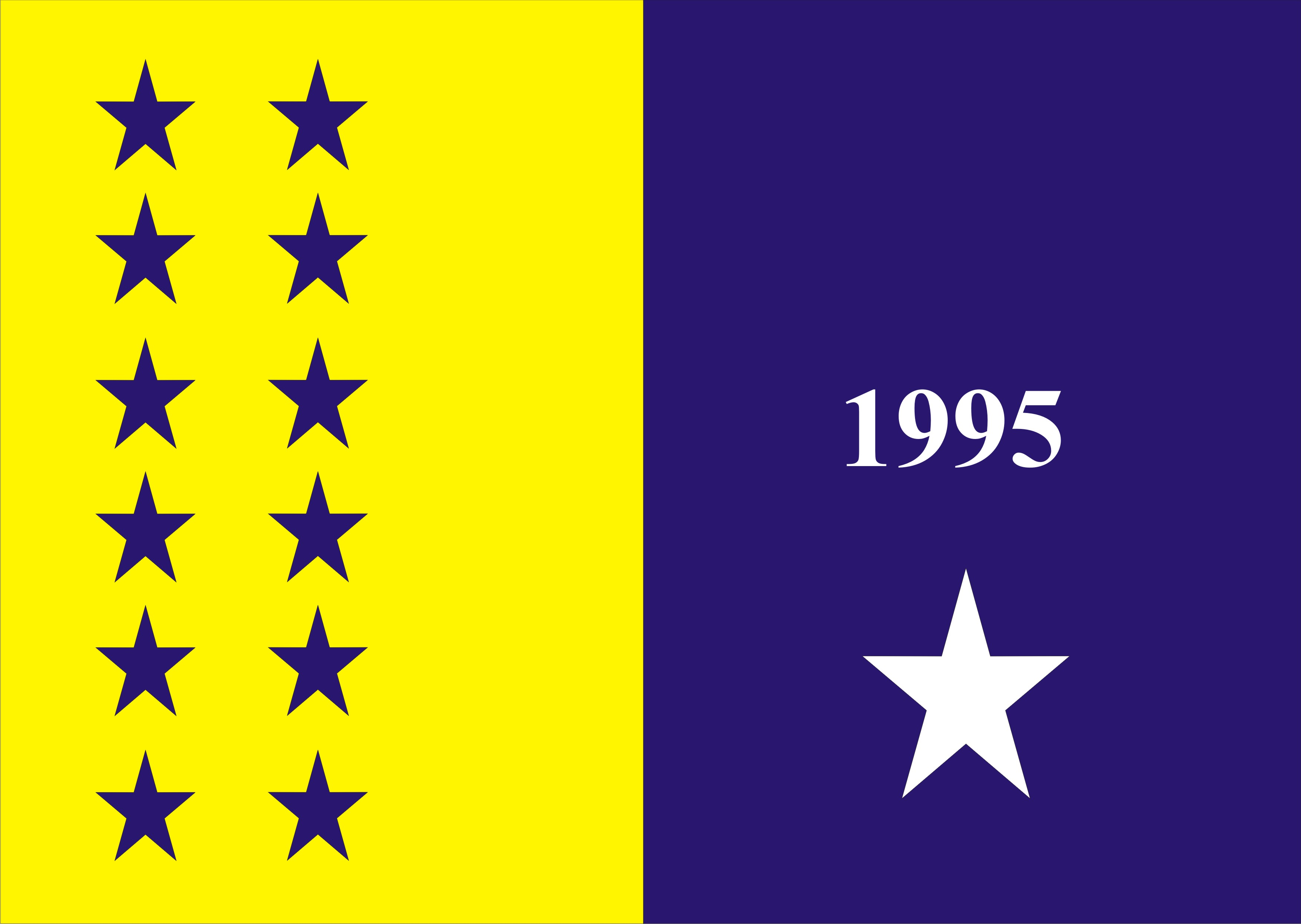
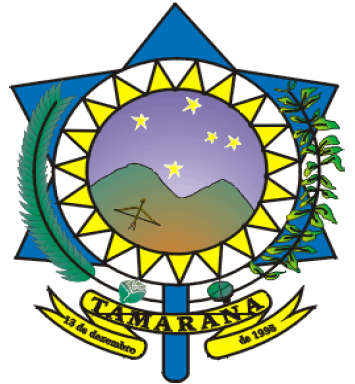
- Flag Coat of arms

- Location within Paraná

- Location in Brazil
- Coordinates: 23°43′22″S 51°05′49″W
- Country: Brazil
- State: Paraná
- Founded: 1919

Area
  - Total: 466.10 km^{2} (179.96 sq mi)
- Elevation: 770 m (2,530 ft)

Population (2020)
  - Total: 15,040
  - Density: 32.27/km^{2} (83.57/sq mi)
- Time zone: UTC−3 (BRT)

Tamarana is a small municipality in the state of Paraná, Brazil. This small town's main activities are crop cultivation, animal husbandry and tourism. The current mayor is Luzia Suzukawa. Edison Siena was the first mayor of the municipality, in 1996. The second mayor was Paulo Mitio Nakaoka, succeeded by Edison Siena's son Roberto Siena, then Suzukawa. The nature in Tamarana is notable, with many rivers and tourist spots, including Estância Tamarana. It is also home to the Apucaraninha Indian Reservation. Tamarana is near Londrina, Ortigueira and other municipalities.
