= Tiago Amaral (politician) =

Brazilian politician (born 1986)

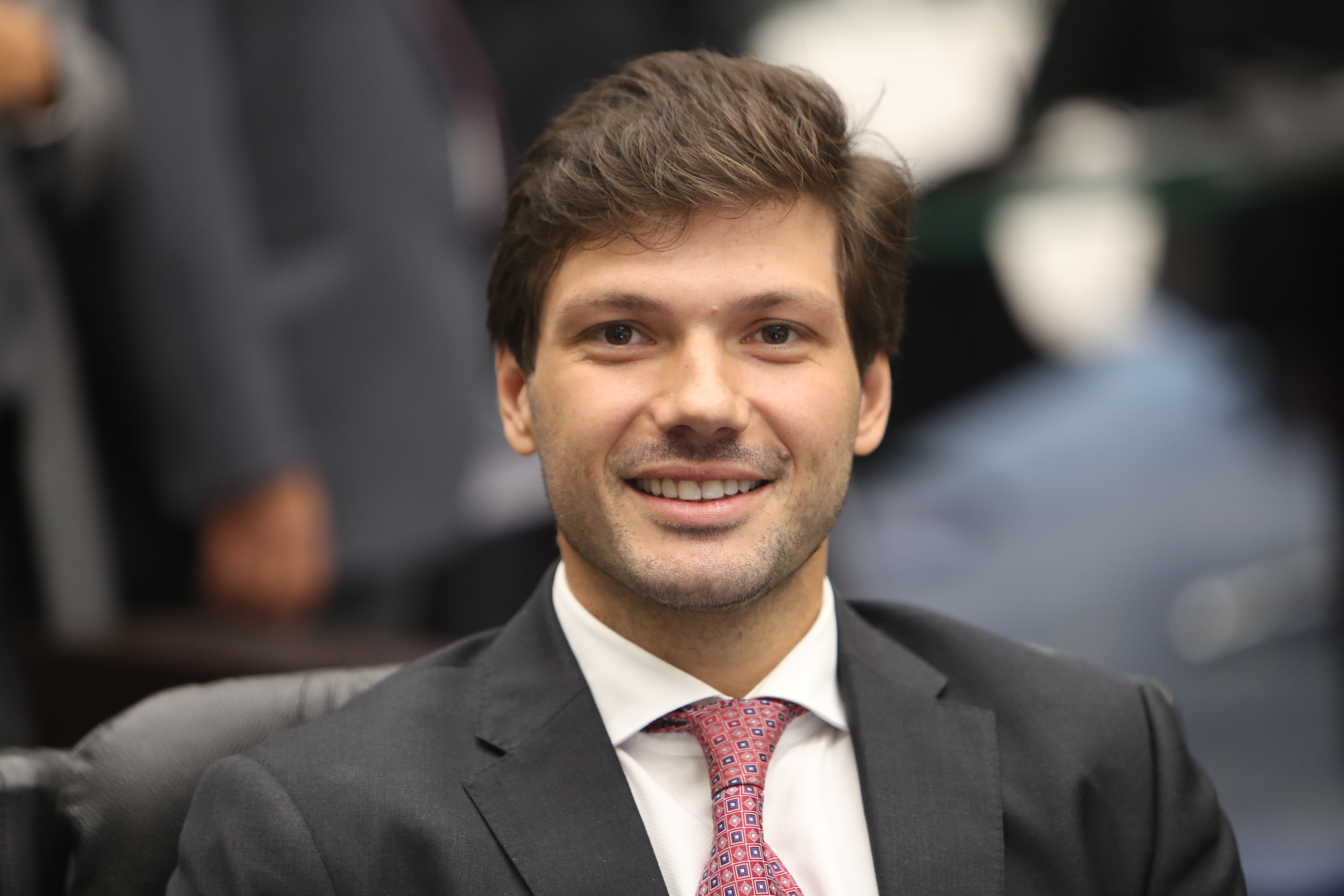
- Amaral in 2020

Mayor of Londrina
- Incumbent
- Assumed office 1 January 2025
- Preceded by: Marcelo Belinati

Personal details
- Born: 18 July 1986 (age 40)
- Party: Social Democratic Party (since 2022)

José Tiago Camargo do Amaral (born 18 July 1986) is a Brazilian politician serving as mayor of Londrina since 2025. From 2015 to 2024, he was a member of the Legislative Assembly of Paraná.
