= Niterói Contemporary Art Museum =

Art gallery in Rio de Janeiro, Brazil

- Museu de Arte Contemporânea de Niterói
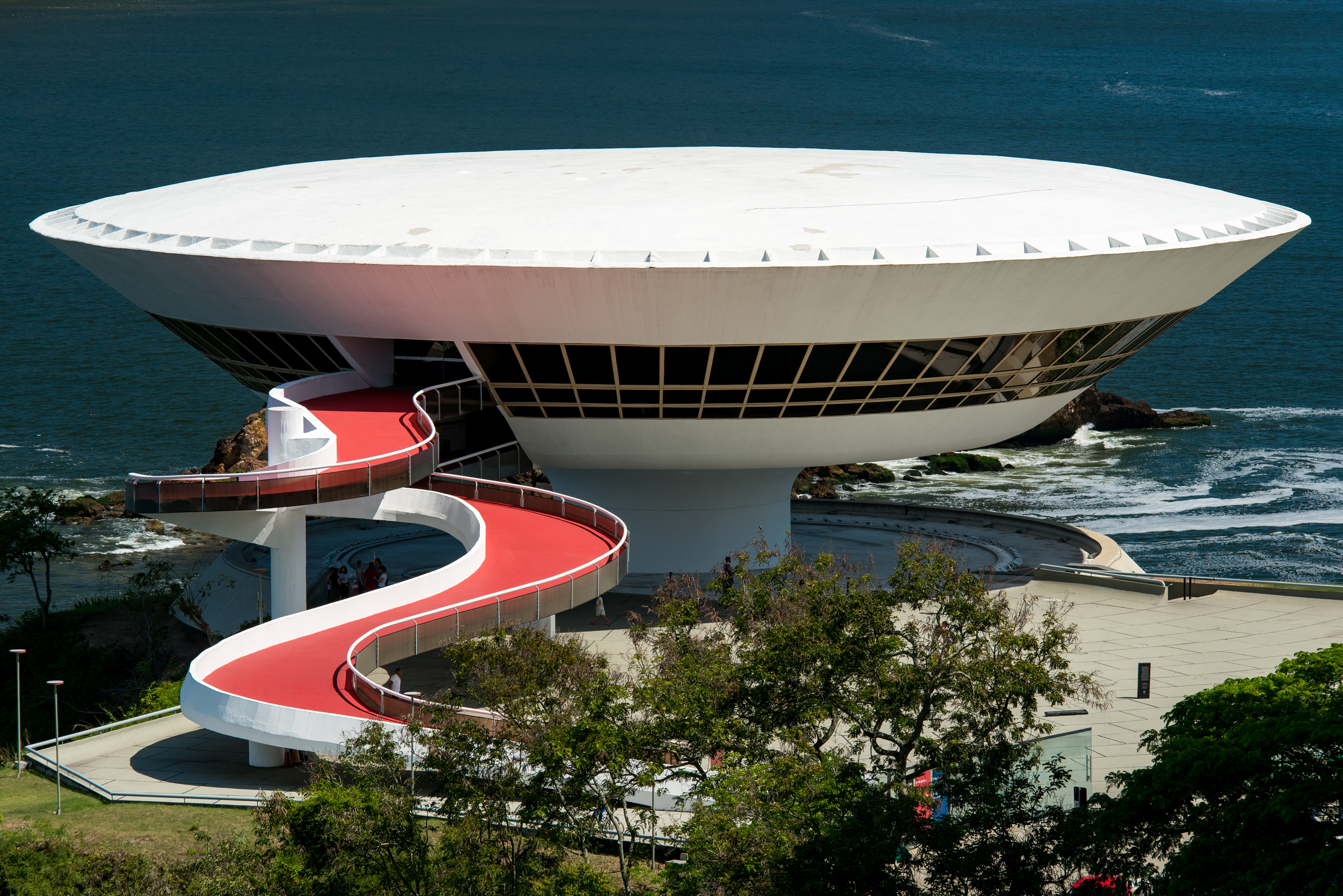
- The Niterói Contemporary Art Museum

- Location within Rio de Janeiro
- Established: 1996
- Location: Niterói, Rio de Janeiro, Brazil
- Coordinates: 22°54′28.51″S 43°7′33.27″W
- Type: Art gallery
- Architect: Oscar Niemeyer
- Website: www.macniteroi.com.br

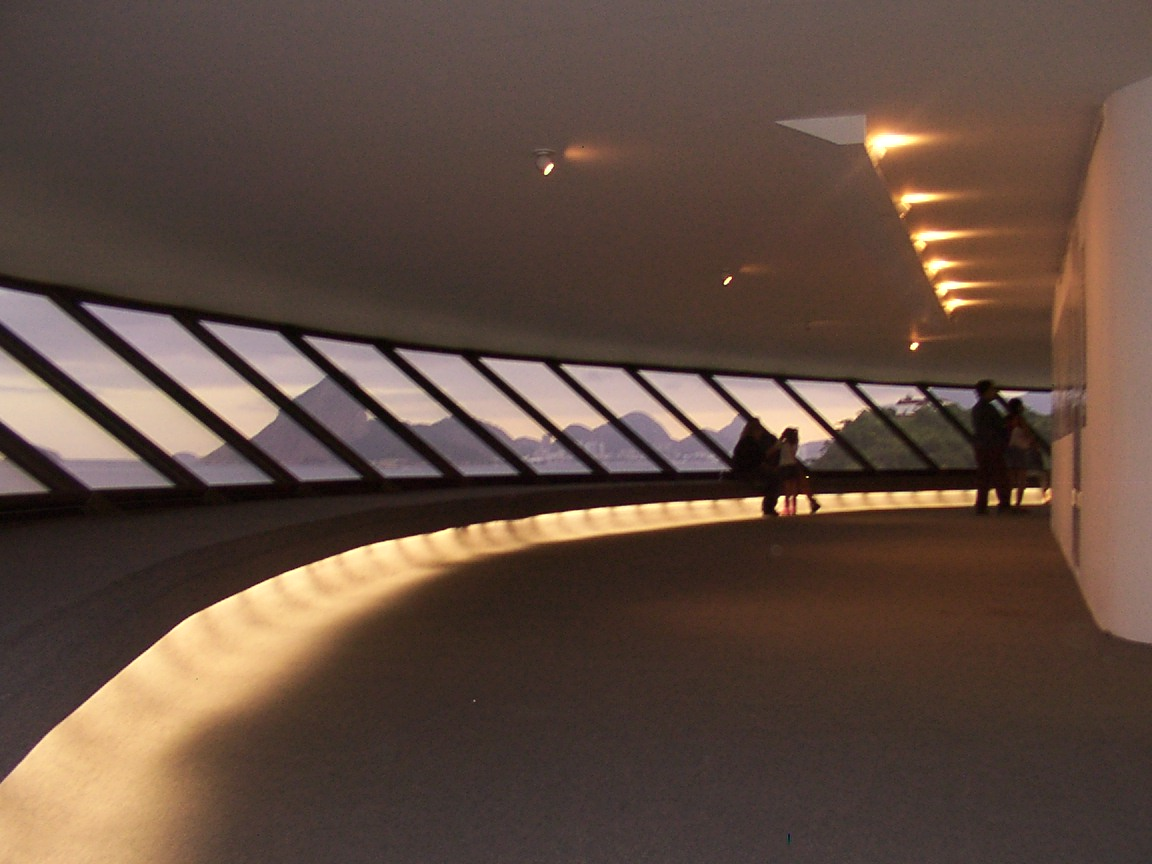
Interior

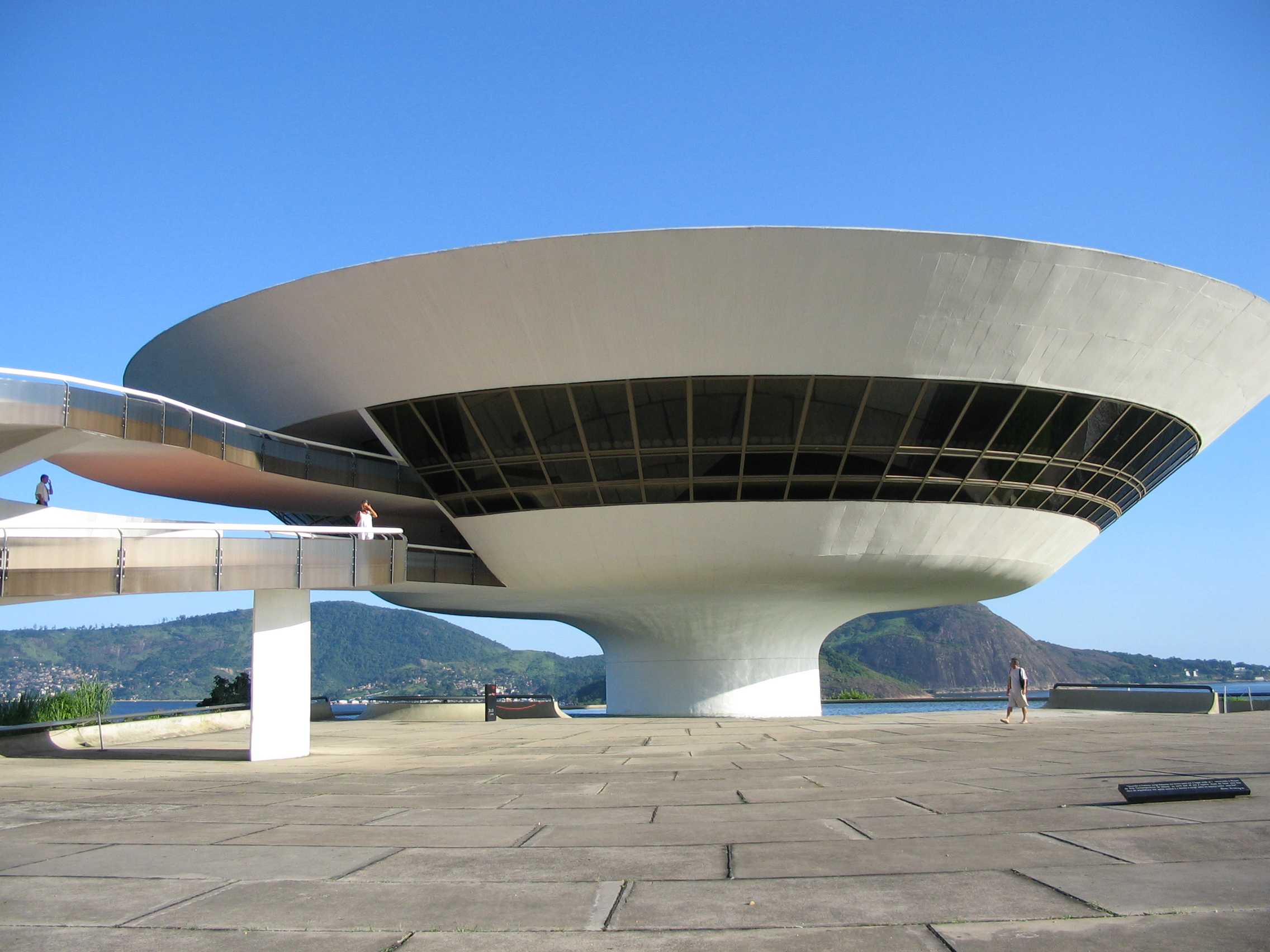
Exterior

The Niterói Contemporary Art Museum (Museu de Arte Contemporânea de Niterói — MAC) is situated in the city of Niterói, Rio de Janeiro, Brazil, and is one of the city’s main landmarks. It was completed in 1996.

The MAC-Niterói was designed by Oscar Niemeyer with the assistance of structural engineer Bruno Contarini, who had worked with Niemeyer on earlier projects. The structure is 16 meters high; its cupola has a diameter of 50 meters with three floors. The museum has a collection of 1,217 works from the art collector João Sattamini. The collection was assembled since the 1950s by Sattamini, constituting the second largest collection of contemporary art in Brazil.

The museum projects itself over Boa Viagem (“Bon Voyage,” “Good Journey”) beach and also a neighborhood, the 817 square metres (8,790 sq ft) reflecting pool that surrounds the cylindrical base “like a flower,” in the words of Niemeyer.

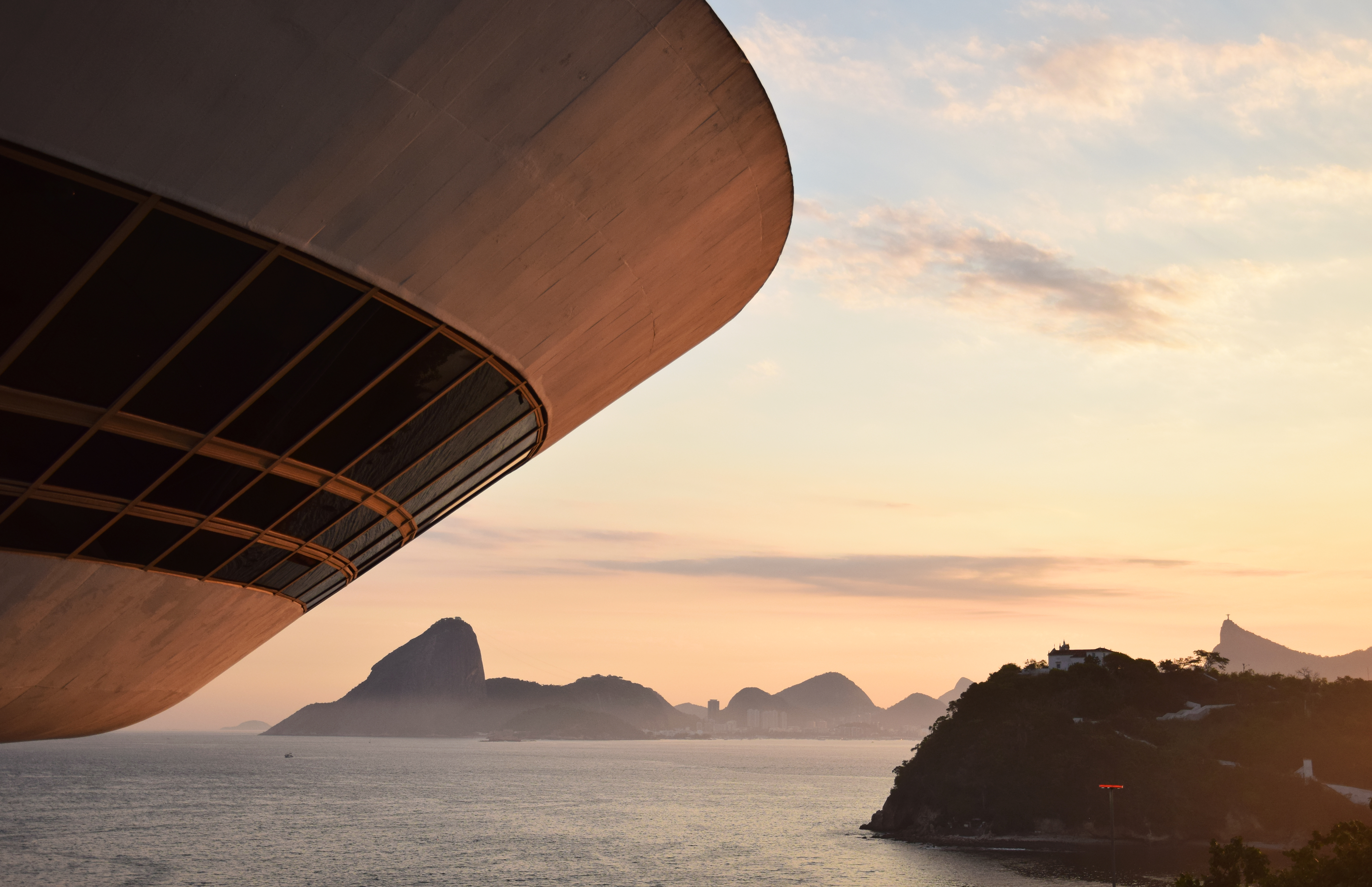

A wide access slope leads to a Hall of Expositions, which has a capacity for sixty people. Two doors lead to the viewing gallery, through which can be seen Guanabara Bay, Rio de Janeiro, and Sugarloaf Mountain. The saucer-shaped modernist structure, which has been likened to a UFO, is set on a cliffside, at the bottom of which is a beach. In the film Oscar Niemeyer, an architect committed to his century, Niemeyer is seen flying over Rio de Janeiro in a UFO which then lands on the site, suggesting this to be the origin of the museum.

== MAC Scandal ==
The MAC Scandal was a political scandal that surrounded the acquisition of land for the museum. The sub-mayor of Niterói's Oceanic Region, Zeca Mocarzel, convinced the owner of the land that construction rights were locked by the city council and, therefore, were able to purchase the land at a low price. When the mayor, Jorge Roberto Silveira, sent the museum project to the city council to obtain the rights to construction, it was accepted in only two days. After the inauguration of the MAC, which substantially increased the property values of nearby areas, the land was sold for more than 5 million reals (approximately 1,250,000 US dollars) in 1996. Because the land deal took place just before Christmas, the people of Niterói said that it was a Christmas present that Jorge Roberto Silveira, Zeca Mocarzel and João Sampaio's (another long-time Niterói politician) gave to themselves.

== Popular feature ==
This place served as the 11th Pit Stop of the television series The Amazing Race 18 and the 8th Pit Stop of The Amazing Race en Discovery Channel 2. It also appears in an American TV commercial for the game The Legend of Zelda: Majora's Mask in 2000.

== See also ==
- List of Oscar Niemeyer works
- Theme Building
