= Universidade Norte do Paraná =

Private university in Londrina, Brazil

Norte do Paraná University
- Universidade Norte do Paraná
- Type: Private
- Established: 23 May 1972
- Chancellor: Marco Antonio Lafranchi
- Students: 150,000
- Location: (Brazil) Londrina, Paraná, Brazil
- Website: http://www.unopar.br

University North of Paraná or Universidade Norte do Paraná is a private university which was created by federal decree number 70592. Administrative infrastructure includes a rectory Londrina, Brazil, pro-rectories and university council. It has campuses in the cities of Londrina, Arapongas and Bandeirantes and was credentialed to distance learning modality in July 2002, and currently possess 424 classrooms used for support in cities spread for all Brazil states.

== Undergraduate programs ==
- 26 undergraduate courses
- 10 sequential courses

== Graduate Courses (lato sensu) ==
- 50 specialization courses

== Graduate Courses (stricto sensu) ==
- Master's degree in Odontology
