= State University of Londrina =

Public university in Londrina, Brazil

- Universidade Estadual de Londrina
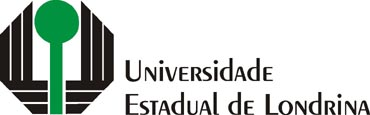
- Other names: UEL
- Type: Public
- Established: January 28, 1970
- Rector: Sérgio Carlos de Carvalho
- Undergraduates: 13.125
- Postgraduates: 4.418
- Location: Londrina, Paraná, Brazil; 23.32531°S 51.19998°W
- Campus: Urban
- Website: www.uel.br

The State University of Londrina (Portuguese: Universidade Estadual de Londrina, UEL) is a public higher education institution located in the city of Londrina, in the state of Paraná, Brazil. It is one of the largest state universities in Brazil, with students from all over the country.

== Notable faculty ==
- Anne Perera MNZM, Sri Lankan food technologist in New Zealand

The cafeteria-style University Restaurant (RU - Restaurante Universitário)

== See also ==
- List of state universities in Brazil
