= Jorge Roberto Silveira =

Brazilian politician

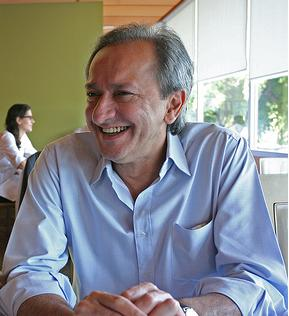
Jorge Roberto Silveira

Jorge Roberto Saad Silveira (born September 9, 1952, in Niterói) is a Brazilian politician.

He was elected four times Mayor of the city of Niterói, state of Rio de Janeiro, Brazil by the Democratic Labour Party. Elected to succeed Waldenir Bragança, he was succeeded as mayor by Rodrigo Neves.
