= Londrina =

- Municipality
- Municipality of Londrina
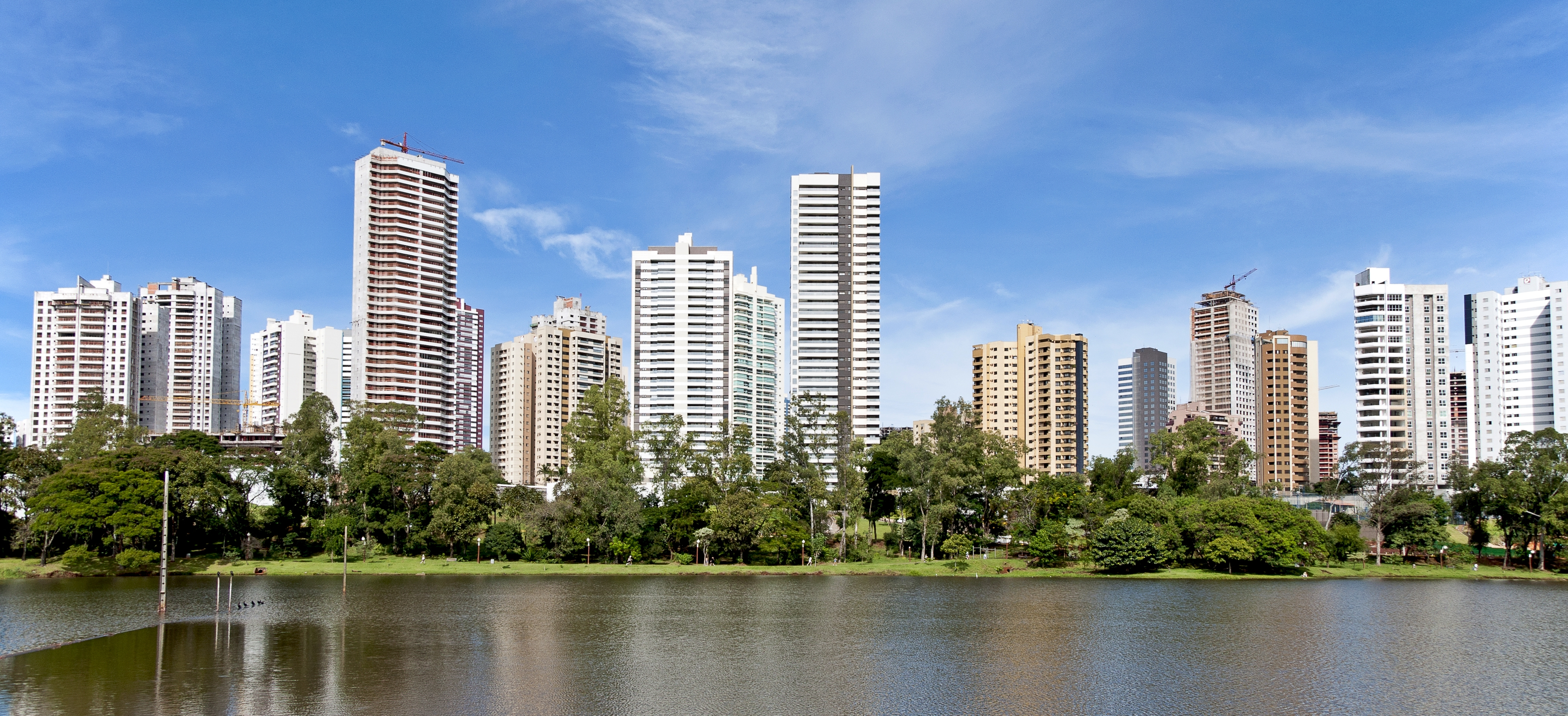
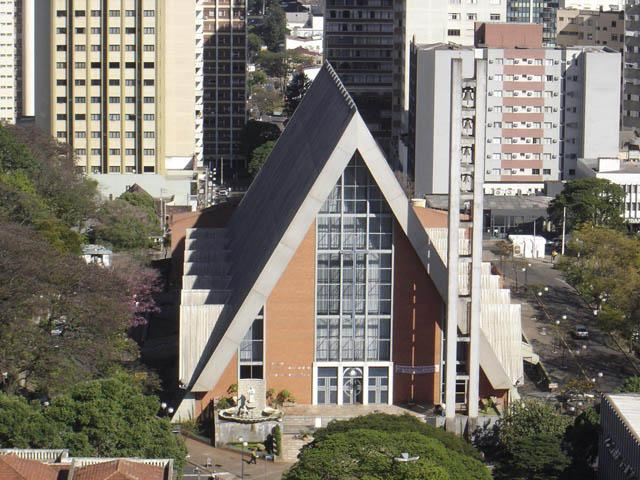
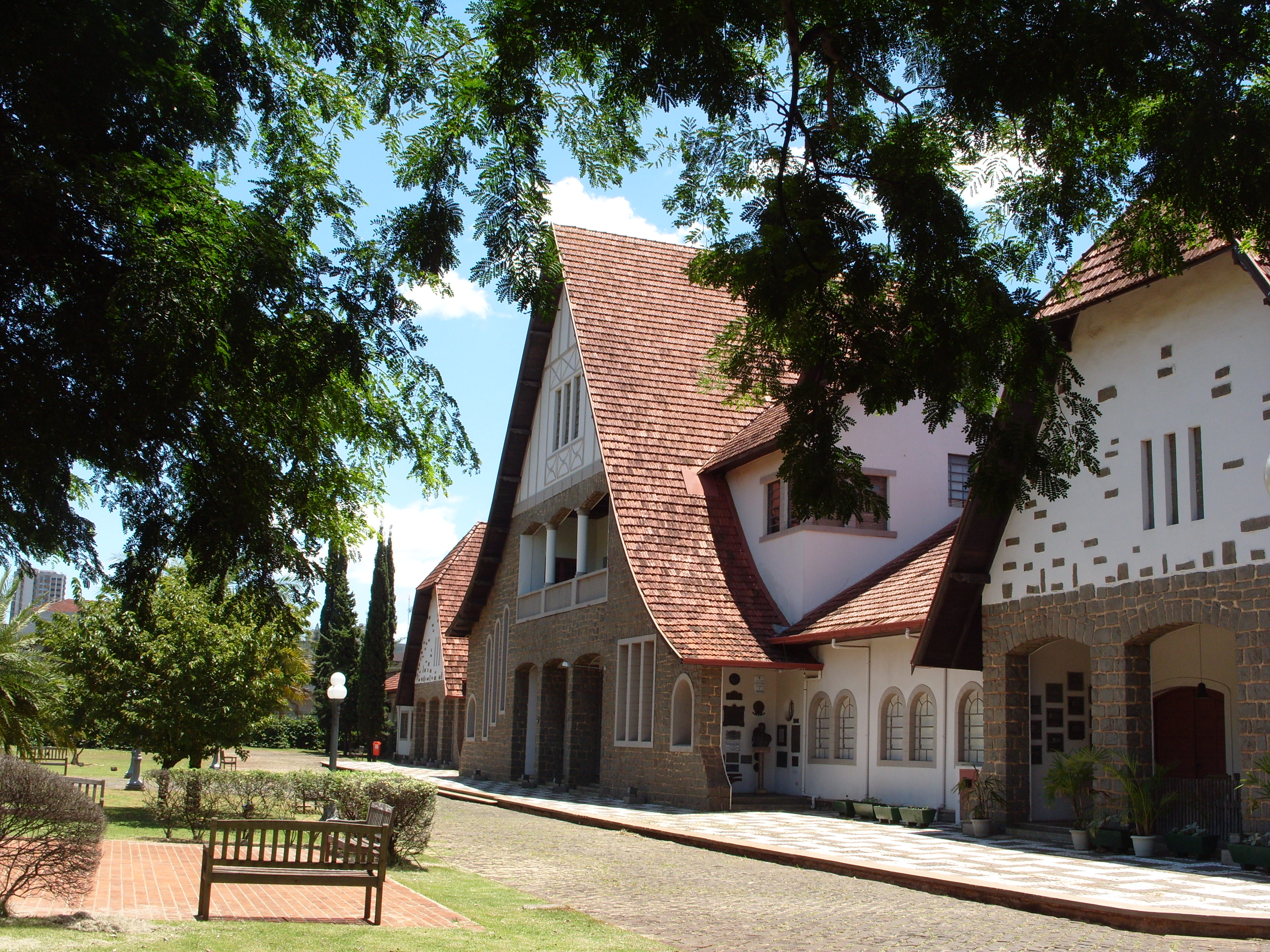
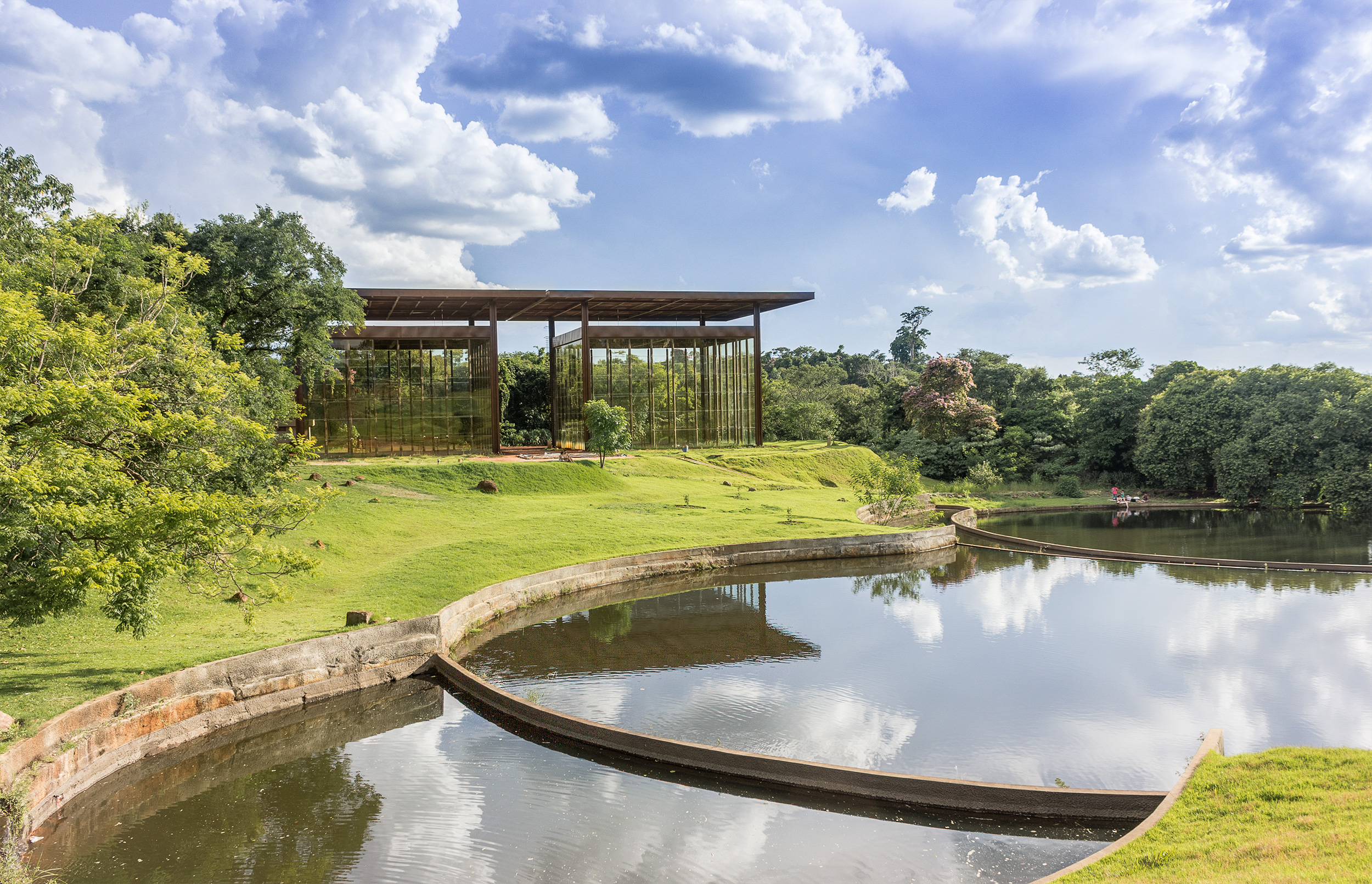
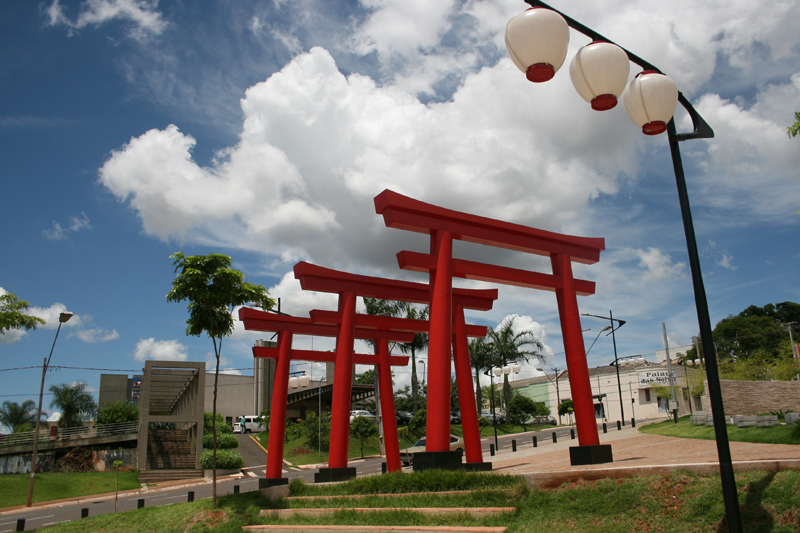
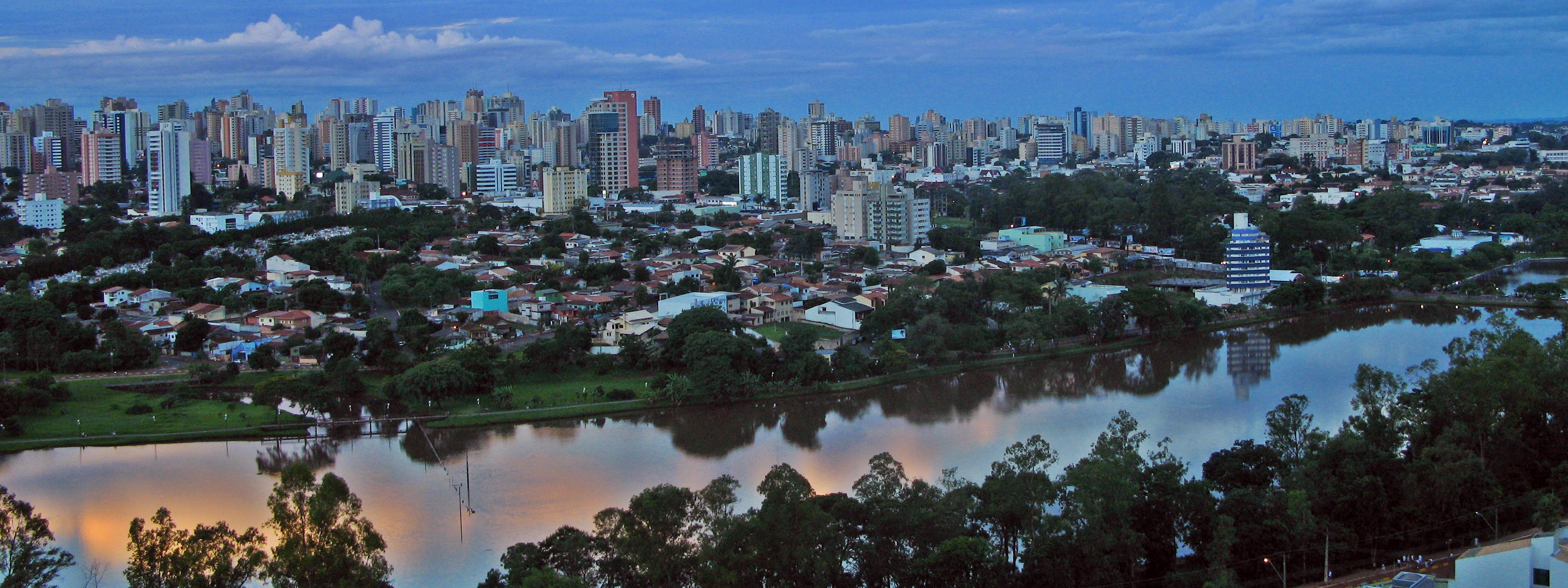
- Clockwise from top: panorama of Londrina and the Igapó Lake; Museum of Londrina; Tomi Nakagawa Square; Igapó Lake; greenhouse of the Botanic Garden of Londrina; and Cathedral of Londrina

- Flag Coat of arms
- Nickname: Pequena Londres ("Little London") / Capital do Café ("Coffee Capital")
- Location in Paraná

- Location in Brazil
- Coordinates: 23°18′36″S 51°09′46″W
- Country: Brazil
- State: Paraná
- Mesoregion: Norte Central Paranaense
- Microregion: Londrina
- Founded: 10 December 1934

Government
  - Mayor: Tiago Amaral (PSD)

Area
  - Municipality: 1,650.809 km^{2} (637.381 sq mi)
  - Metro: 4,194.9 km^{2} (1,619.7 sq mi)
- Elevation: 610 m (2,000 ft)

Population (2025)
  - Municipality: 581,382
  - Density: 352.180/km^{2} (912.142/sq mi)
- Demonym: Londrinense
- Time zone: UTC-3 (BRT)
- Postal Code: 86000-000
- Area code: +55 43
- HDI (2010): 0.778 – high
- Major airport: Londrina Airport
- Website: Official website

Londrina (Portuguese pronunciation: [lõˈdɾĩnɐ], literally "from London") is a city located in the north of the state of Paraná, Brazil, and is 388 km (241 miles) north-west of the state capital Curitiba. It is the second largest city in the state and fourth largest in the southern region of the country, with 555,965 inhabitants in the whole municipality (2022).

Londrina was originally explored by British settlers, and then officially established in 1930 by a small group of Italian, Japanese and German settlers. It rapidly became the commercial, political, and cultural centre of the state's northern pioneer zone. Its universities include the Universidade Estadual de Londrina (Londrina State University) and the Universidade Tecnológica Federal do Paraná (Federal University of Technology – Paraná).

== Demography ==
The city was named after British entrepreneurs who launched railroad stations in the region to ease the transportation of coffee grains from northern Paraná and southern São Paulo states to the port of Santos. The word Londrina pays homage to the British capital (Londres in Portuguese), since a London cotton company, Paraná Plantations Limited, made the original investment to settle in this area.

Historical population
Year	Pop.	±%
1900	509	—
1910	976	+91.7%
1920	1,483	+51.9%
1930	27,475	+1752.7%
1940	65,889	+139.8%
1950	71,321	+8.2%
1960	136,401	+91.2%
1970	347,544	+154.8%
1980	403,005	+16.0%
1990	385,580	−4.3%
2000	447,065	+15.9%
2009	510,707	+14.2%
2010	506,645	−0.8%
2011	511,278	+0.9%
2012	515,707	+0.9%
2013	537,566	+4.2%
2014	543,003	+1.0%
2022	555,965	+2.4%

== Geography ==
The city is located in the north of the state of Paraná, and is 388 km (241 miles) away from the state capital, Curitiba.

=== Climate ===
According to the Köppen-Geiger climate classification system, the city of Londrina has a humid subtropical climate (Cfa) influenced by the Atlantic Forest biome. Average annual precipitation is 1,622.6 mm (63.9 in). Mean average annual temperature is 20.62 °C (69 °F).

Climate data for Londrina (1981–2010)
Month	Jan	Feb	Mar	Apr	May	Jun	Jul	Aug	Sep	Oct	Nov	Dec	Year
Record high °C (°F)	37.3 (99.1)	37.5 (99.5)	36.7 (98.1)	34.9 (94.8)	32.0 (89.6)	31.0 (87.8)	31.3 (88.3)	33.3 (91.9)	39.4 (102.9)	40.0 (104.0)	39.0 (102.2)	39.3 (102.7)	40.0 (104.0)
Mean daily maximum °C (°F)	30.0 (86.0)	30.3 (86.5)	30.8 (87.4)	28.6 (83.5)	24.9 (76.8)	23.8 (74.8)	24.2 (75.6)	26.6 (79.9)	27.6 (81.7)	29.1 (84.4)	30.2 (86.4)	30.1 (86.2)	28.0 (82.4)
Daily mean °C (°F)	24.5 (76.1)	24.4 (75.9)	24.1 (75.4)	22.3 (72.1)	18.7 (65.7)	17.3 (63.1)	17.2 (63.0)	19.2 (66.6)	20.6 (69.1)	22.6 (72.7)	23.8 (74.8)	24.2 (75.6)	21.6 (70.9)
Mean daily minimum °C (°F)	20.2 (68.4)	20.1 (68.2)	19.2 (66.6)	17.3 (63.1)	13.8 (56.8)	12.3 (54.1)	11.7 (53.1)	13.1 (55.6)	14.8 (58.6)	17.2 (63.0)	18.5 (65.3)	19.5 (67.1)	16.5 (61.7)
Record low °C (°F)	12.0 (53.6)	13.0 (55.4)	8.2 (46.8)	4.8 (40.6)	0.0 (32.0)	−2.8 (27.0)	−0.5 (31.1)	0.3 (32.5)	3.0 (37.4)	7.6 (45.7)	8.8 (47.8)	11.3 (52.3)	−2.8 (27.0)
Average precipitation mm (inches)	243.2 (9.57)	179.8 (7.08)	134.9 (5.31)	94.3 (3.71)	109.7 (4.32)	86.4 (3.40)	66.1 (2.60)	54.3 (2.14)	102.6 (4.04)	139.7 (5.50)	150.9 (5.94)	221.1 (8.70)	1,583 (62.32)
Average precipitation days (≥ 1.0 mm)	15	12	9	7	8	5	5	4	7	9	9	12	102
Average relative humidity (%)	78.1	76.3	74.3	75.4	78.3	79.5	74.8	68.6	67.8	69.7	70.4	73.8	73.9
Mean monthly sunshine hours	185.0	192.3	224.4	212.7	191.5	198.0	202.4	218.7	187.7	199.4	209.1	198.5	2,419.7
Source: Instituto Nacional de Meteorologia

== Economy ==
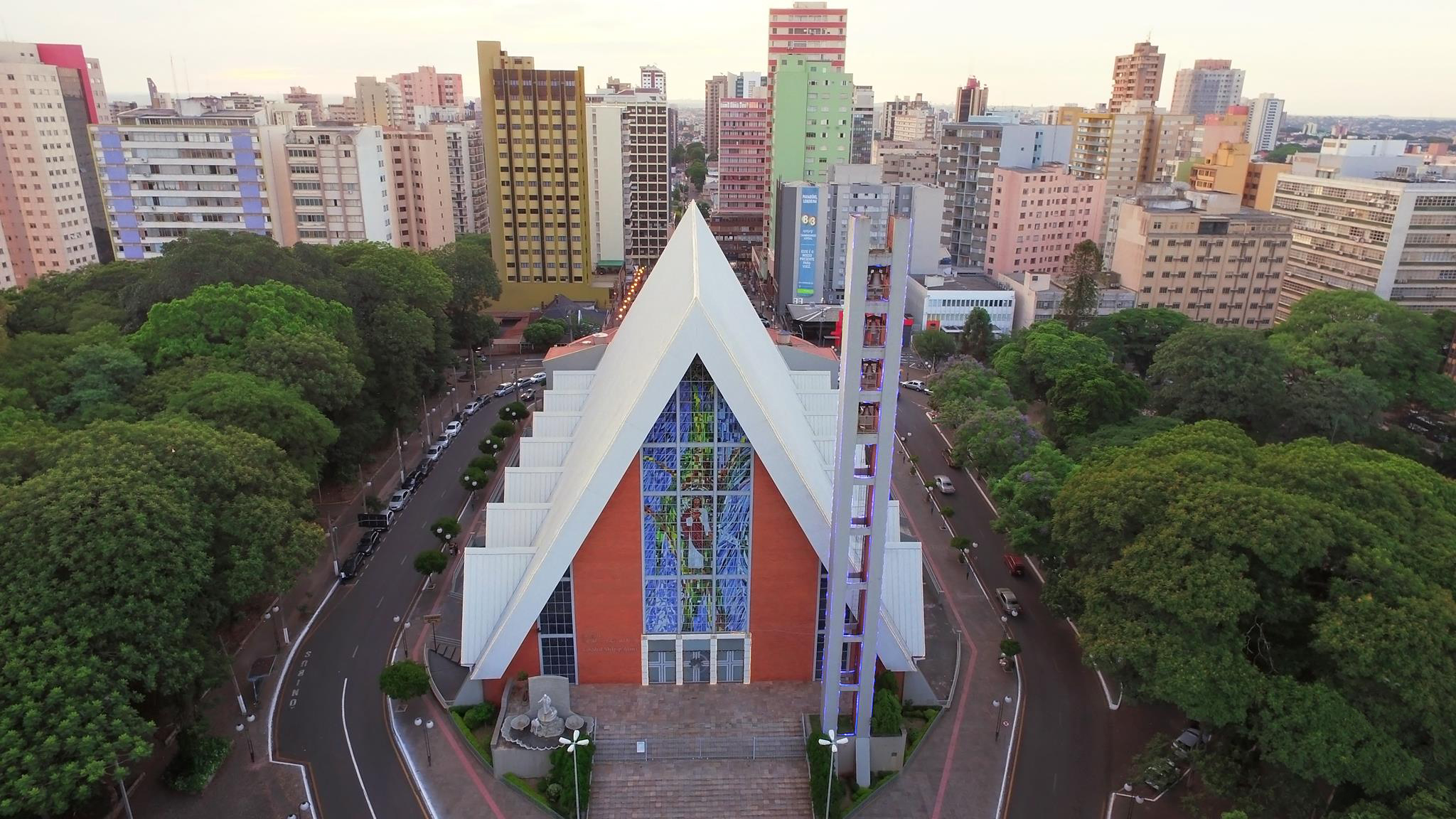
Metropolitan Cathedral of Londrina

Agriculture continues to be Londrina's major economic activity, although its importance has diminished in recent years. Agricultural activity was diversified beyond coffee, and today corn, wheat, cotton, horticulture, beans, peanuts, rice, sugar cane, soy bean, and fruit plantations thrive due to the rich Northern Paraná/South Western São Paulo State "terra roxa/vermelha" crimson soil. Although the city has increased its industrial park by adding weaving, textiles and agricultural factories, Londrina's main wealth continues to be agricultural production. Today, Londrina is also known for its commerce and service sectors. Moreover, real estate is another growing sector that has generated jobs and boosted even more the size of this city in Paraná.

It possesses one of the largest universities in the country, the Londrina State University, as well as several private colleges.

The city is served by Londrina – Governador José Richa Airport.

Once a year, the city hosts the largest agricultural fair in Latin America, the Expo Londrina.

== Policy ==
According to the 1988 Constitution, Londrina is located in a presidential federal republic. It was inspired by the American model; however, the Brazilian legal system follows the Roman-Germanic tradition of positive law. Municipal administration is governed by the executive and legislative branches.

The mayor elected in the 2012 Brazilian municipal elections to serve from 2013 to 2016 was Alexandre Kireeff of the Social Democratic Party (PSD). In the 2016 municipal elections, Marcelo Belinati of the Progressive Party (PP) was elected, and he was reelected in the 2020 municipal elections. In the 2024 municipal elections, Tiago Amaral of the Social Democratic Party (PSD) was elected.

The legislative branch of the city of Londrina is constituted by the City Council, composed of 19 councilors elected for four-year terms (in accordance with the provisions of Article 29 of the Constitution).

== Health ==
Londrina is served by both universal health care system, through the Sistema Único de Saúde (SUS) and by many private health care facilities. The municipality has 133 SUS health facilities, such as hospitals, local clinics and nurseries. Despite ample access to healthcare, infant mortality rate are relatively high, with 10.68 deaths per one thousand births as of 2017.

== Education ==
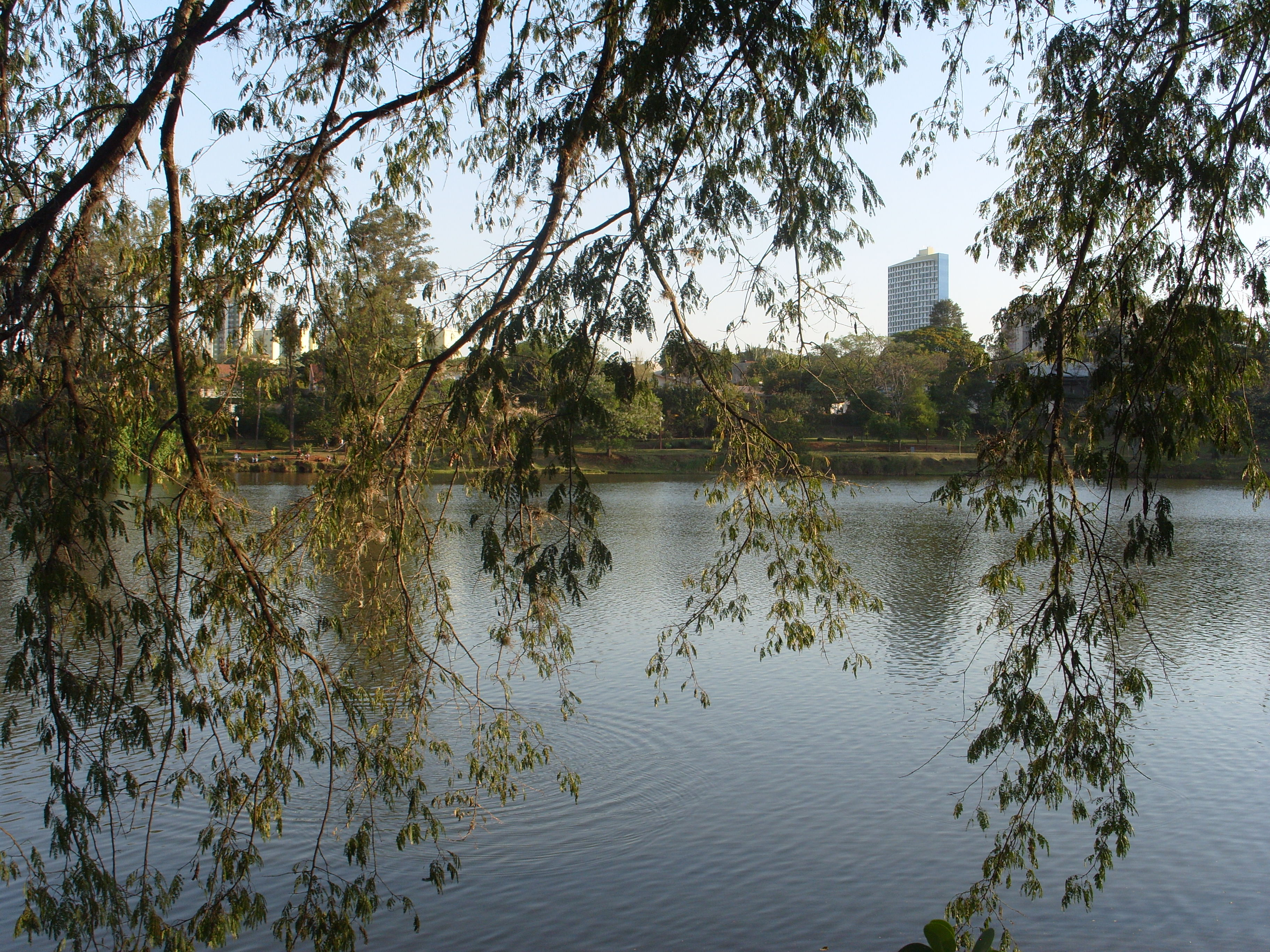
Quebec neighborhood in Londrina

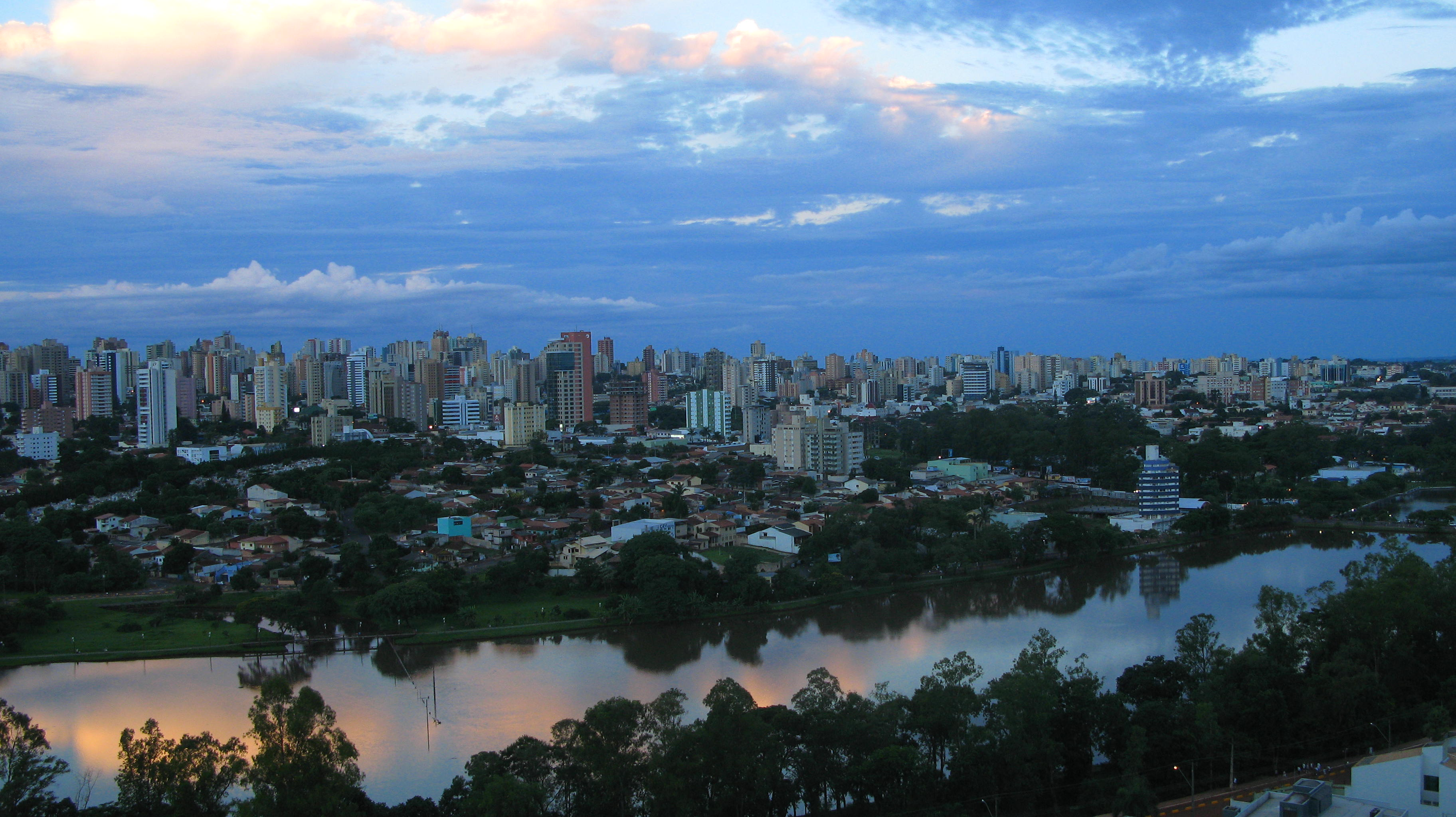
View of Londrina

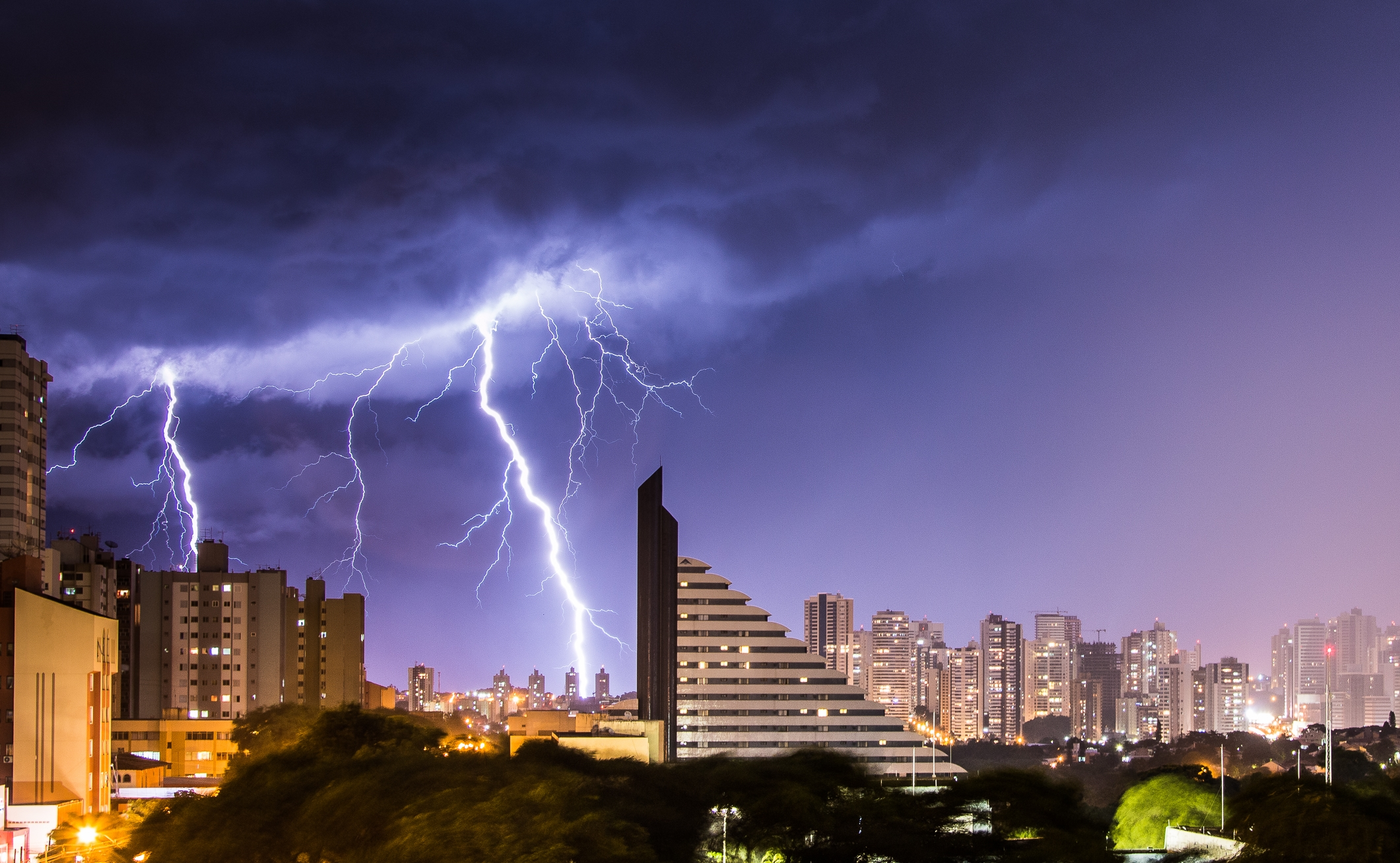
Londrina during a storm

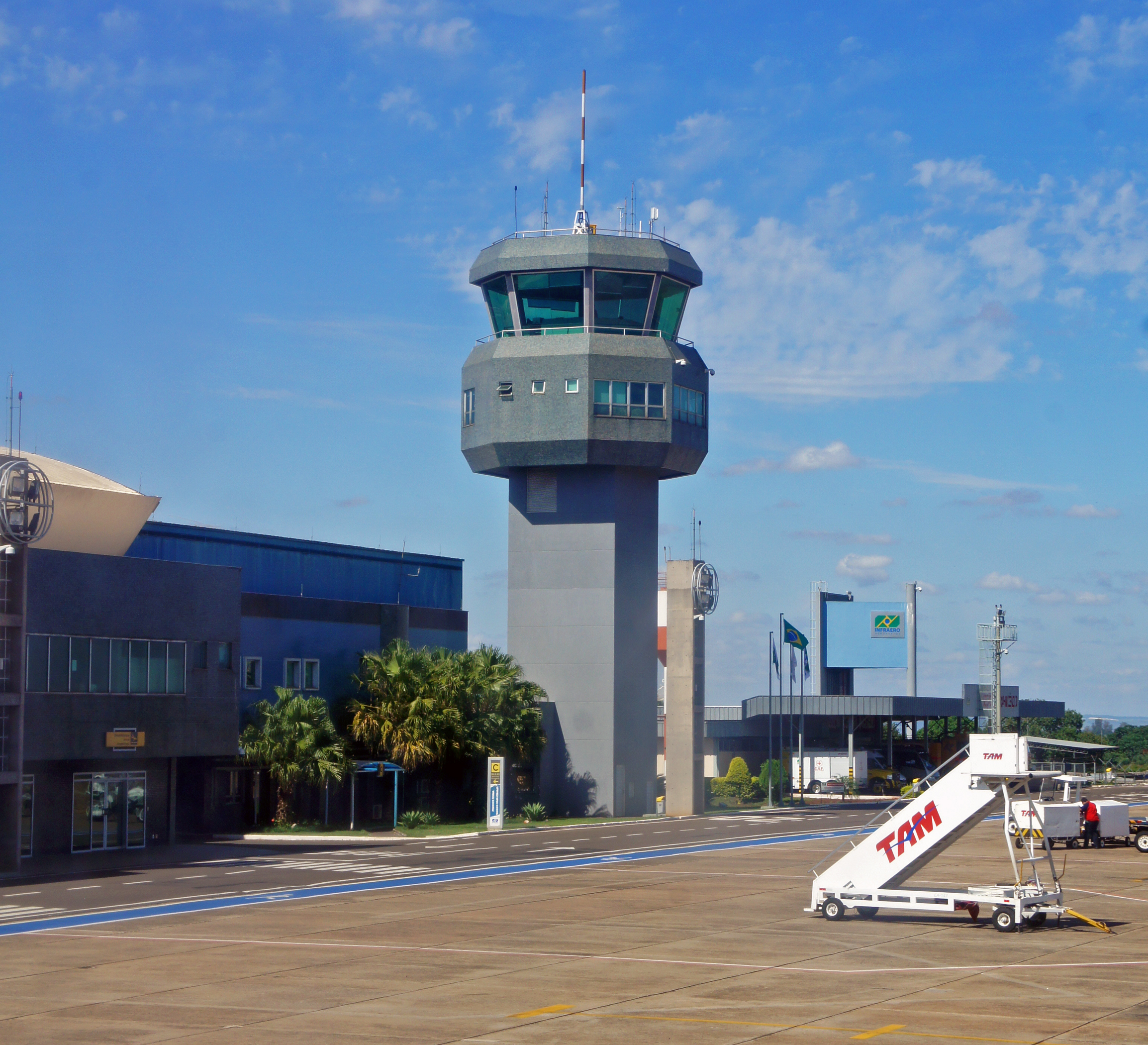
Londrina Airport

Portuguese is the official national language, and thus the primary language taught in schools. But English and Spanish are part of the official high school curriculum. As of 2010, the rate of formal schooling is 97.3% between the age of 6 and 14 years old. The basic education system has 65.065 enrolled and the middle/high school system has 18,140 students as of 2018.

=== Colleges and universities ===
- Universidade Estadual de Londrina (UEL) – "Londrina State University"
- Universidade Tecnológica Federal do Paraná (UTFPR) – "Federal University of Technology – Paraná"
- Pontifícia Universidade Católica do Paraná (PUC-PR) – "Pontifical Catholic University of Paraná"
- Universidade Norte do Paraná (UNOPAR) – "North Paraná University"
- Centro Universitário Filadéfia (UniFil) – "Filadélfia University Center"
- Faculdade Pitágoras – "Pitágoras College"
- Faculdade Arthur Thomas (FAAT) – "Arthur Thomas College"
- Faculdade Teologica Sul Americana (FTSA) – "South American Theological College"

== Metropolitan region of Londrina ==
Instituted by State Complementary Law 81 on 17 June 1998, the Metropolitan Region of Londrina includes the cities of Londrina, Cambé, Ibiporã, Sertanópolis, Bela Vista do Paraíso, Jataizinho, Rolândia, Tamarana, and Arapongas, totaling 750,000 inhabitants.

== Religion ==
The city is the seat of the Roman Catholic Archdiocese of Londrina. The city is also home to two stakes of the Church of Jesus Christ of Latter-day Saints as well as the headquarter of the Brazil Londrina Mission, which encompasses northern Paraná and parts of São Paulo.

== Sports ==
The city's football clubs include Londrina Esporte Clube, founded in 1956, and the Associação Portuguesa Londrinense founded in 1950. They play at Café stadium, a 45,000 spectator capacity stadium.

Inesul/Londrina, owned by INESUL – Instituto de Ensino Superior de Londrina, a higher education institution, is a city's major basketball club and competes in the Campeonato Brasileiro de Basquete.

== Notable people ==
- Michelle Alves, model
- Giovane Élber, footballer
- Fernandinho, footballer
- Giba, volleyball player, Olympic and World champion
- Bruno Henrique, footballer
- João Victor Horto, racing driver
- Jádson, footballer
- Victor Lazzarini, composer
- Everson Maciel, footballer
- Marcão, footballer
- Naldo, footballer
- Elisângela Oliveira, volleyball player, Olympic medallist
- Flávia de Oliveira, model
- Rafinha, footballer
- Rogério Romero, swimmer
- Pedro Rezende, YouTuber
- Rafael Santos, footballer
- Dionatan Teixeira, footballer
- Amanda Ungaro, model and Epstein affair figure
- Douglas Vieira, judoka, Olympic runner-up
- Diogo Yabe, swimmer

== Twin towns – sister cities ==
Londrina is twinned with:

- Guimarães, Portugal
- Modena, Italy
- León, Nicaragua
- Nago, Japan
- Toledo, United States
- Zhenjiang, China
