= Klabin =

Brazilian paper company

Klabin S.A.
- Type: Public company
- Traded as: B3: KLBN3, KLBN4, KLBN11; Ibovespa Component; OTCID Basic Limited: KLBAY
- Industry: Paper industry
- Founded: 1899
- Founder: Maurício Freeman Klabin; Salomão Klabin; Hessel Klabin; Miguel Lafer
- Headquarters: São Paulo, Brazil
- Key people: Daniel Miguel Klabin, (Chairman); Fabio Schvartsman (CEO)
- Products: Paper, Packaging, Industrial sacks and Paper recycling
- Revenue: ▲US$ 3.7 billion (2025)
- Net income: ▼US$ 303.1 million (2025)
- Number of employees: 9,071
- Website: www.klabin.com.br

Klabin is a Brazilian paper producing, exporting and recycling company headquartered in São Paulo. It is the largest paper producer and exporter in the country, focusing on the production of pulp, packaging paper and board, corrugated cardboard packaging, and industrial sacks, besides selling timber in logs. It is controlled by Klabin Irmãos & Cia and NIBLAK Participações S/A, which jointly own 52.23% of the voting capital. It is organized into four business units (Forestry, Pulp, Paper and Converting) certified by the Forest Stewardship Council (FSC).

Klabin has 24 industrial plants, 23 of them in Brazil, spread over ten states, and one in Argentina. It has 400.4 thousand hectares of forests in Parana 136.3 thousand hectares in Santa Catarina, and 8.7 thousand hectares in São Paulo, of which 253.4 thousand hectares are reforested and 236.7 hectares are native areas preserved or set aside for conservation. It also maintains 14 offices distributed in different parts of Brazil.

== History ==
=== Beginning and origins ===
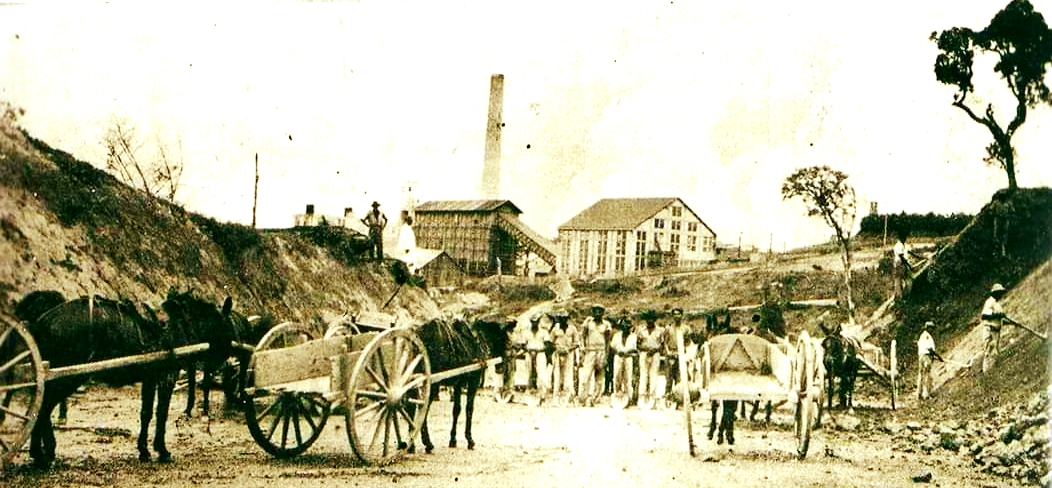
Monte Alegre Unit, in Parana, late 1930s.

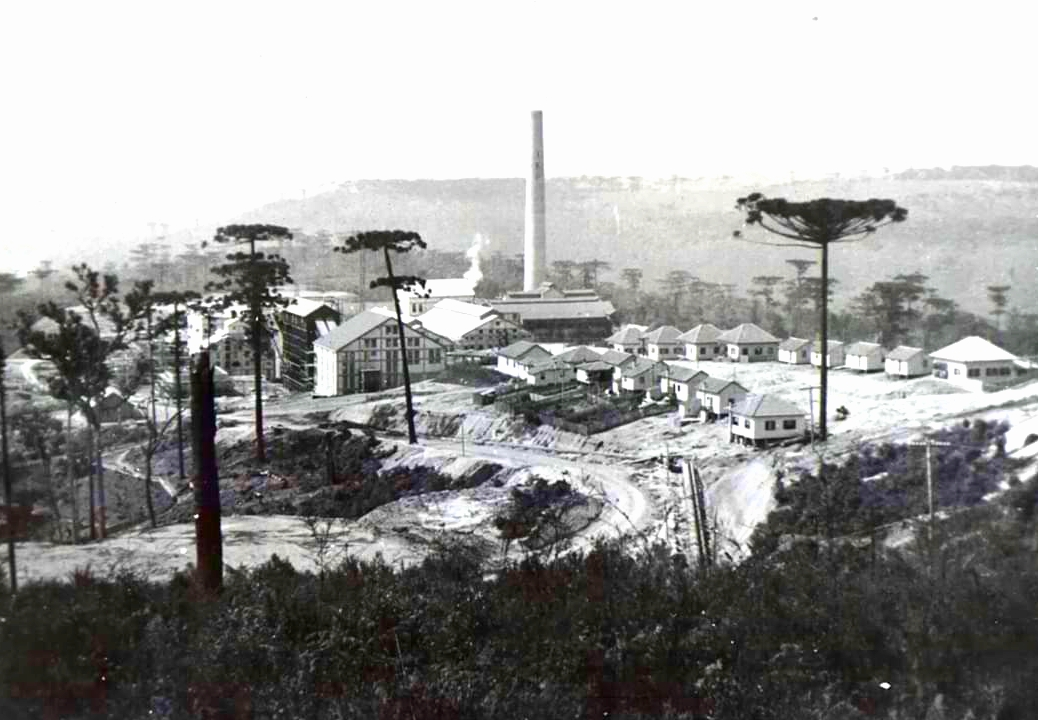
Monte Alegre Unit, in Parana, 1940s.

Klabin's history begins with the arrival of two families of Lithuanian immigrants to Brazil; the Klabins and the Lafer. In 1889, Maurício Freeman Klabin arrived in the country and, in 1890, founded the printing company M.F.Klabin & Irmão. In 1894, his uncle, Zelman Lafer, arrived with his son Miguel Lafer; his brothers Salomão, Hessel and Luiz Klabin came from the United States. Afterwards, his cousins Max Klabin, Wolff Kadischewitz, Lazar Kadischewitz and Henrique Kadischewitz also came to Brazil.

In 1899, united by their homeland and family, Lafer-Klabin brothers and cousins founded Kablin Irmãos & Cia. (KIC) in the city of São Paulo, a store, manufacturing workshop, and importer of office and typography supplies.

In 1902, KIC leases the Fábrica de Papel Paulista, in Itu, with the contract ending in 1907. In 1909, KIC established its first mill, the Companhia Fabricadora de Papel, which only began operating in 1914, and by the 1920s, had become one of the largest manufacturers in the sector in Brazil. In 1920 Klabin Irmãos e Cia. opened its office in Rio de Janeiro, then the capital of Brazil.

=== 1930s and 1940s ===
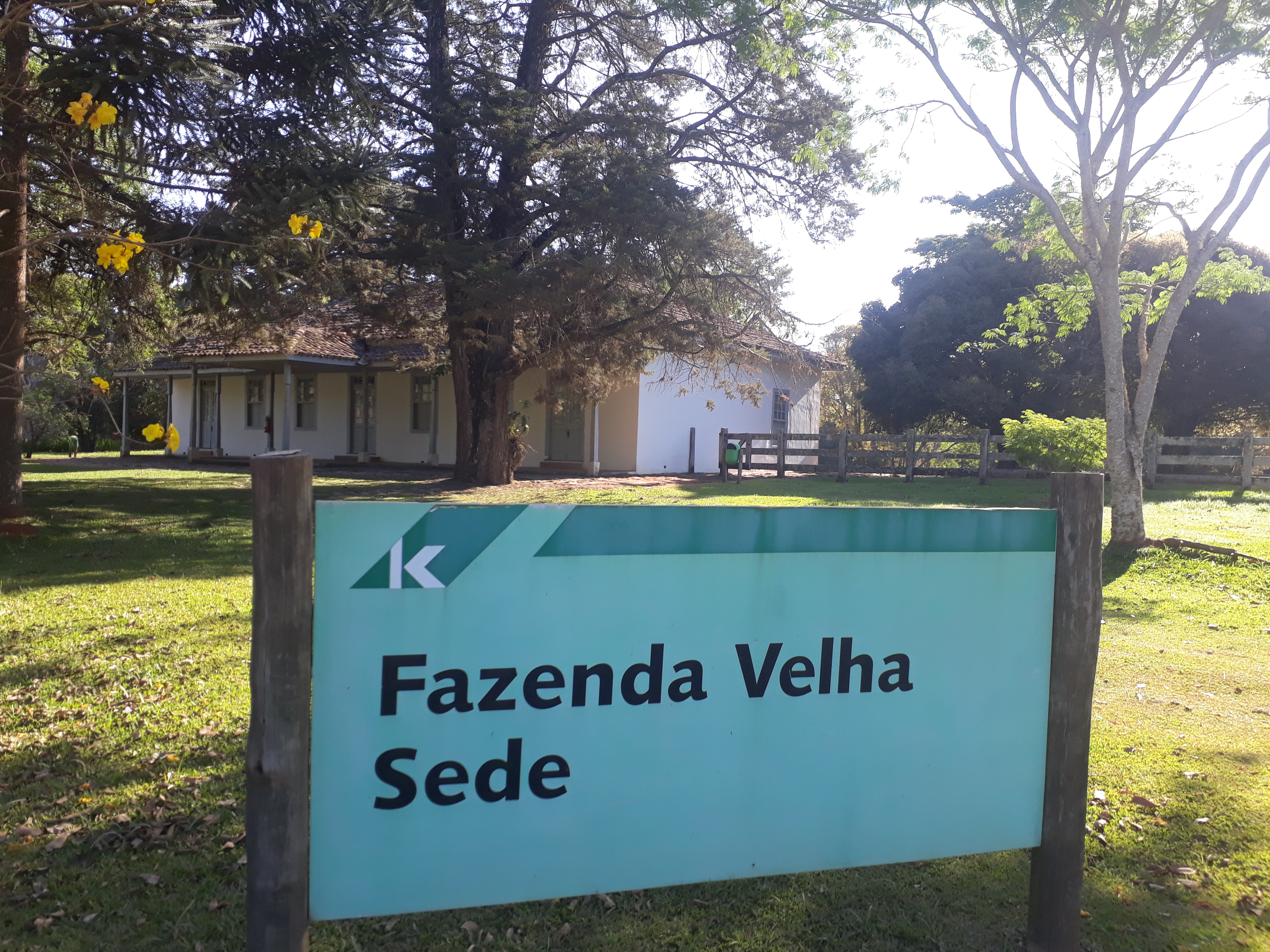
Plaque from the headquarters of Fazenda Velha, former headquarters of the Monte Alegre Farm, in Telemaco Borba.

In the 1930s, the company began to be managed by cousins Wolff Kadischewitz Klabin (1880–1957), Horácio Lafer, and Samuel Klabin (second generation of family managers). The rise of the Klabin Group began in this period, with expansion in the paper sector and diversification of business, such as the leasing of Manufatura Nacional de Porcelanas S/A in 1931.

In 1934, a Klabin head office was founded in Parana (Industrias Klabin do Parana de Celulose) and the installation of a mill on the Monte Alegre Farm was started. At the time, the farm, which was located in Tibagi, was owned by a bankrupt French company that passed its assets on to the Bank of the State of Parana, with the intention of paying off its debts. Thanks to the help of the state's intervenor, Manuel Ribas, who was a friend of Wolf Klabin, the Klabin Group received all the support necessary for the construction of the mill, which was intended to produce newsprint (also producing kraft paper years later). Getúlio Vargas visited the construction works in 1943 and the mill started its activities in 1946.

=== 1950s and 1960s ===
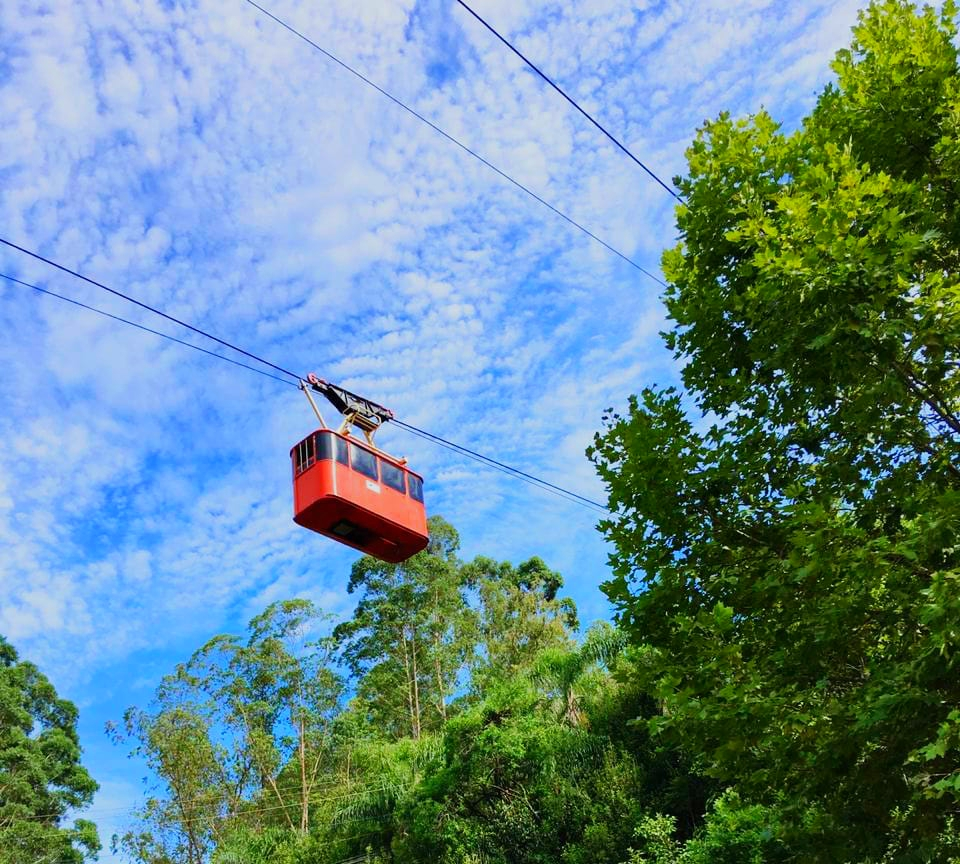
View of the Telemaco Borba Cable Car, inaugurated in the 1950s, in Parana.

Klabin started to invest in the production of rayon with the purchase of part of Rilsan Brasileira S/A in 1951, and in new industrial sectors, such as the acquisition of Companhia Universal de Fosforos, in 1955, in São Paulo. In 1953, in the presence of President Getúlio Vargas, the Presidente Vargas Hydroelectric Plant, built and run by Klabin, was inaugurated in Parana. In the transport sector, the company built the Telemaco Borba Cable Car in 1959.

In 1961, the Vila Anastácio Unit became the largest corrugated paper production capacity in Latin America. In 1963, paper machine number 6 (Expansion Project III) of the Monte Alegre Unit was inaugurated. On that occasion, President João Goulart, together with other authorities, visited the plant.

In 1969, the activities of the mill Papel e Celulose Catarinense (PCC) were started in Lages (Santa Catarina), focused on the production of kraft paper and softwood pulp. The unit was a pioneer in the country in chlorine dioxide pulp bleaching.

=== 1970s ===
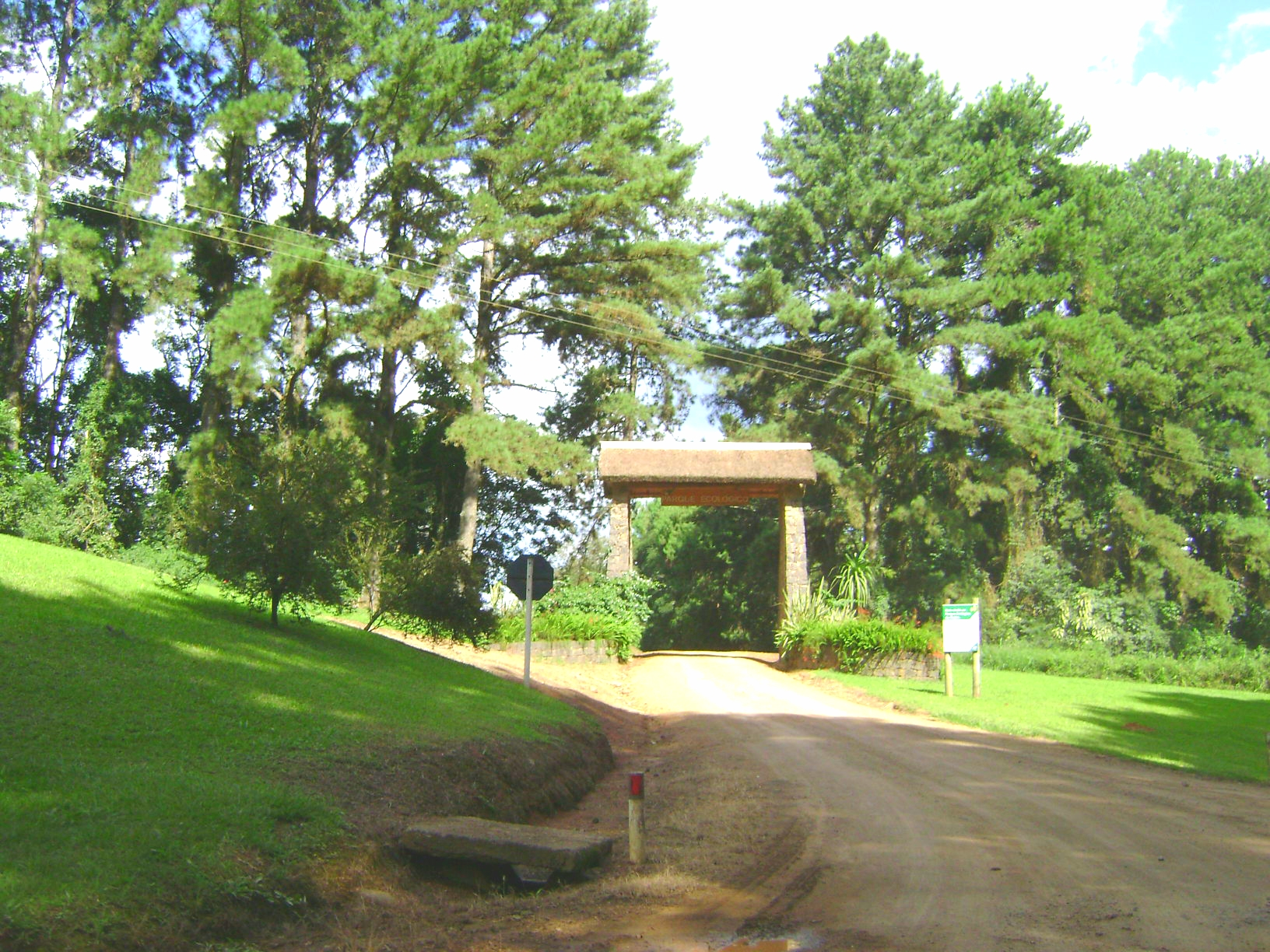
Samuel Klabin Ecological Park entrance, in Telemaco Borba.

In 1973, production began at Papelão Ondulado do Nordeste (Ponsa), in Goiana (PE), a pioneer in the manufacture of cellulose from sugarcane bagasse. In Lages, Celucat Artes Gráficas was inaugurated, producing bags and envelopes.

In 1979, the Samuel Klabin Ecological Park was created on the Monte Alegre Farm, with an area of approximately 11 thousand hectares, where 71% is formed by natural forests. Still in 1979, the company started to adopt the administrative professionalization in its companies and soon after, each family created a holding company, which individually determined a member to represent them in the general council. The board of directors was then established and the company went public on the São Paulo Stock Exchange. In the following years, Kaplin adapted and modernized its administrative management, enabling the expansion of its industrial power with the multiplication of companies on national soil and several international investments.

=== 1980s ===
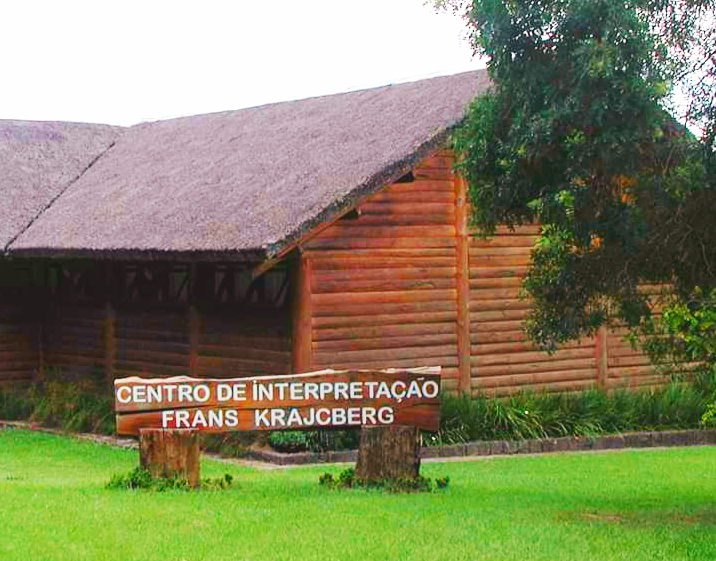
Frans Krajcberg Nature Interpretation Center, at the Samuel Klabin Ecological Park, in Telemaco Borba.

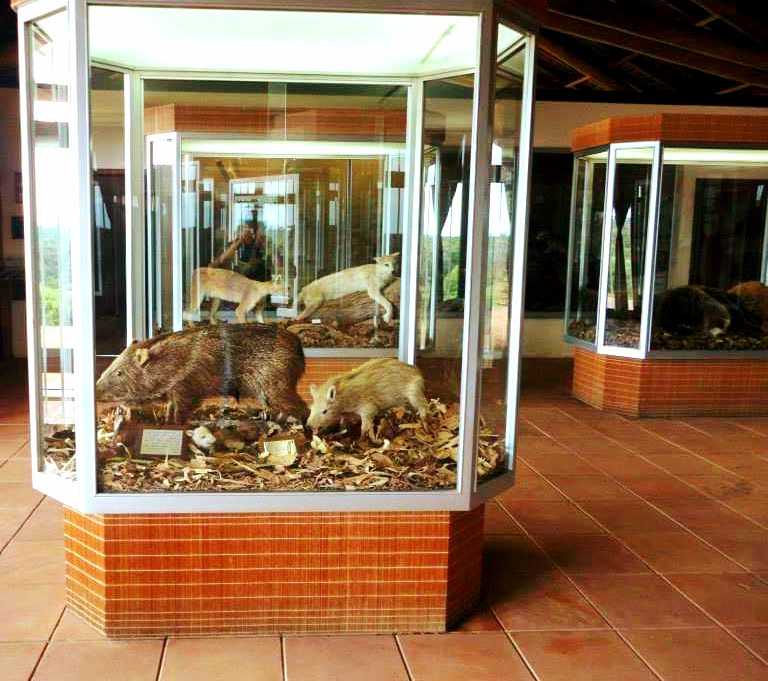
Frans Krajcberg Nature Interpretation Center, at the Samuel Klabin Ecological Park, in Telemaco Borba.

On February 14, 1980, Project IV, which aimed to modernize and expand paper production at Industrias Klabin do Parana, was officially concluded. President João Baptista de Oliveira Figueiredo and Parana governor Ney Braga participated in the occasion, in the company of other federal, state, and municipal authorities, in Telemaco Borba.

In 1984, Klabin's Phytotherapy Program was created, with the objective of producing phytotherapeutic products using native botanical species. The Program was the first in the world related to the management of non-timber forest products certified by the Forest Stewardship Council (FSC) in 1999. The company's collection of local flora has already accounted for 2,249 taxonomically confirmed species, of which 1,078 were collected on the Monte Alegre Farm alone, from 150 different botanical families.

In the collection, the species correspond to 628 trees, 939 shrubs, 682 herbs, and the rest are under review. The origin of the exsicatas comes from various regions of the Monte Alegre Farm in Telemaco Borba (76%), from other municipalities in Parana, and, to a lesser extent, from other states in Brazil. As for the specimens collected in Telemaco Borba, 93% are from the Monte Alegre Farm and 7% from other locations in the city.

In 1989, the Scientific Breeding Ground was created in the ecological park, dedicated to the conservation and behavioral studies of fauna species. The Frans Krajcberg Nature Interpretation Center was also created, offering a space for the development of environmental education project activities and a museum collection with zoological and botanical pieces to convey knowledge of the region's biodiversity.

=== 1990s ===
In October 1995, the then called IKPC - Indústrias Klabin de Papel e Celulose S.A. acquired Votorantim's share in KIV Participações S.A., a company formed by Klabin S.A., Parisa Participações S.A. (Iochpe Group) and S.A. Indústrias Votorantim. In 1997, in a joint venture with Kimberly Clark, KCK Tissue S.A. is created to produce tissue paper in Argentina. The same year also saw the separation of the Packaging and Disposables Business Units. In May 1998, Klabin and Kimberly Clark formed a joint venture called Klabin Tissue S.A., with equal stakes, operating in the sanitary paper market in Brazil. Klabin led the Brazilian market with traditional brands of toilet paper, as well as kitchen towels, napkins and tissues; the company later became Klabin Kimberly S.A.

In 1998 the State Private Natural Heritage Reserve (RPPN) Monte Alegre Farm was created by Decree 182 of the Environmental Institute of Parana (IAP), with an area of 3,852 hectares. Also in 1998, Klabin's forests are certified by the FSC becoming the first company in the Americas from the pulp and paper sector to receive this certification. At the Piracicaba Plant, the TetraPak recycling machine is inaugurated.

=== 2000s ===
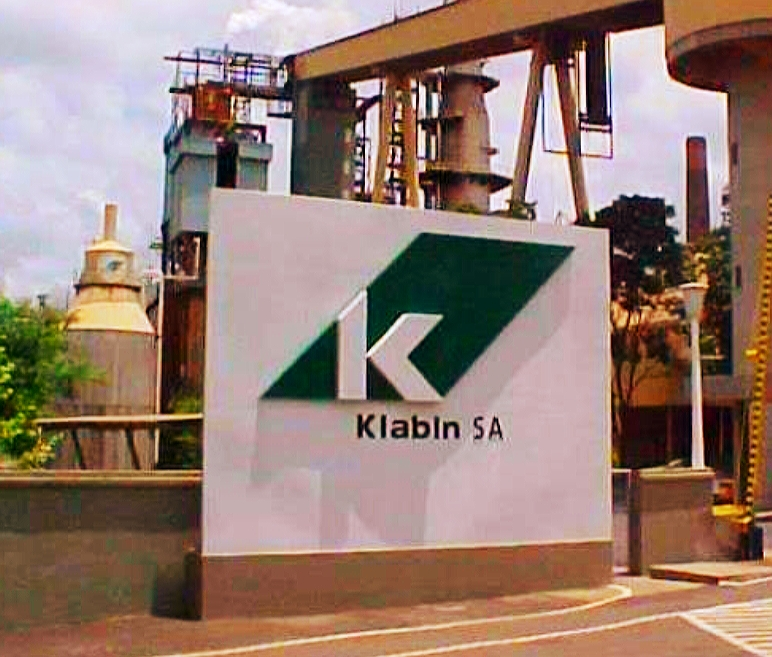
Entrance to Klabin Monte Alegre, in Telemaco Borba.

In 2000, the company became the owner of 99% of the shares of Klabin Riocell S.A. (currently Klabin S.A.). In July 2000, it acquired Igaras Papéis e Embalagens, a Brazilian manufacturer of paper and cardboard boxes, for 918 million reais, with three units: Otacilio Costa (Santa Catarina), Ponte Nova (Minas Gerais) and Angatuba (São Paulo). At the time of the acquisition, Klabin increased its share of the Brazilian carton market from 18% to 30%. In 2001, the company went through a restructuring and adopted the Klabin S.A. brand.

On October 17, 2002, the Klabin Herbarium was created, in order to research and analyze botanical species in the company's forest areas, as well as to identify, classify and study the morphoanatomical characteristics of the species. In 2003, the company decides to cease production of newsprint and in 2008, the Expansion Project MA-1100 is inaugurated at the Monte Alegre Unit (PR). The unit now ranks among the ten largest paper mills in the world and Klabin among the six largest global manufacturers of virgin-fiber cartonboard.

=== 2010s ===
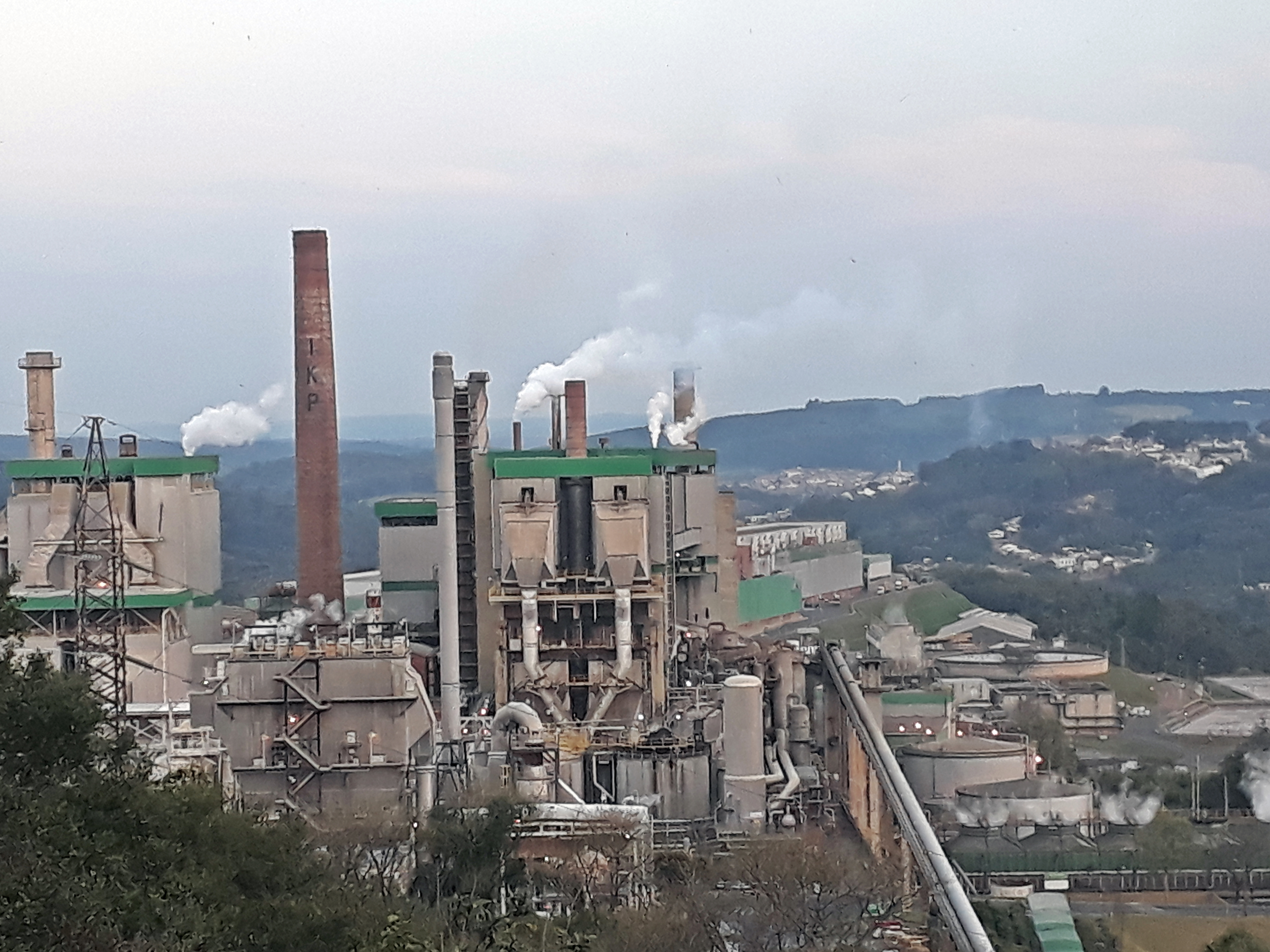
Monte Alegre Unit, in Telemaco Borba, in 2017.

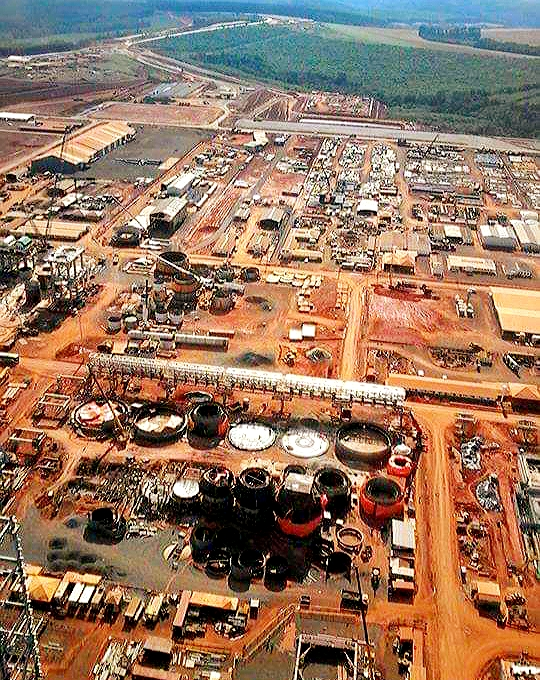
Construction of the industrial complex of the Puma Unit, in Ortigueira, Parana.

In 2011, Arauco Forest Brasil, a subsidiary of Celulosa Arauco y Constitución, announced, together with Klabin, the purchase of an area of 107,000 hectares of land in Parana, where 63,000 hectares are dedicated to commercial forests (reforestation). The purchase was estimated at $473.5 million, where they acquired 100% of the total capital of Florestal Vale do Corisco Ltda. based in Jaguariaíva. The intermediation was carried out by Centaurus Holdings S.A., comprising a 51% stake by Klabin and 49% by Arauco.

Also in 2011, the Klabin Group made a land acquisition for the construction of a new pulp mill in Parana. Klabin entered a new phase of expansion and investments by announcing the purchase of land in Campina dos Pupos, in the town of Ortigueira, near Telemaco Borba. In 2014 the construction of the new industrial unit began and, in the same year, the State Private Natural Heritage Reserve (RPPN) Serra da Farofa Complex was created in Santa Catarina, being Klabin's largest RPPN. Covering 4,987.16 hectares of remaining Atlantic Forest area, the reserve comprises the municipalities of Bocaina do Sul, Painel, Rio Rufino, Urubici, and Urupema. The place is home to at least 600 species of flora and 75 species of fauna, including the araucaria forest, altitude fields, and the sources of the Caveiras and Canoas rivers.

Also in 2014, Klabin integrates, for the first time, the BM&FBovespa's Corporate Sustainability Index (ISE). The company is also a signatory of the UN Global Compact and the National Pact for the Eradication of Slave Labor, seeking suppliers and business partners that follow the same values of ethics, transparency, and respect for the principles of sustainability.

In March 2016, with the start of operations of the Ortigueira Unit in Parana, the company began to simultaneously supply the market with hardwood pulp (eucalyptus), softwood pulp (pine) and fluff pulp (raw material used in the manufacture of diapers and absorbents that was only imported in the country) from a single industrial unit with an investment of 8.5 billion reais. The inauguration of the industrial complex was attended by several authorities and was the first official visit of President Michel Temer. The name officially given by the company to the factory in Ortigueira is Puma Unit. In October 2016, the company announced the purchase of Embalplan Indústria e Comércio de Embalagens, located in the municipality of Rio Negro, in Parana, as well as the purchase of Hevi Embalagens, located in Manaus, Amazonas. With these acquisitions, the company increased its corrugated cardboard box production capacity by 10%, or 70,000 tons per year.

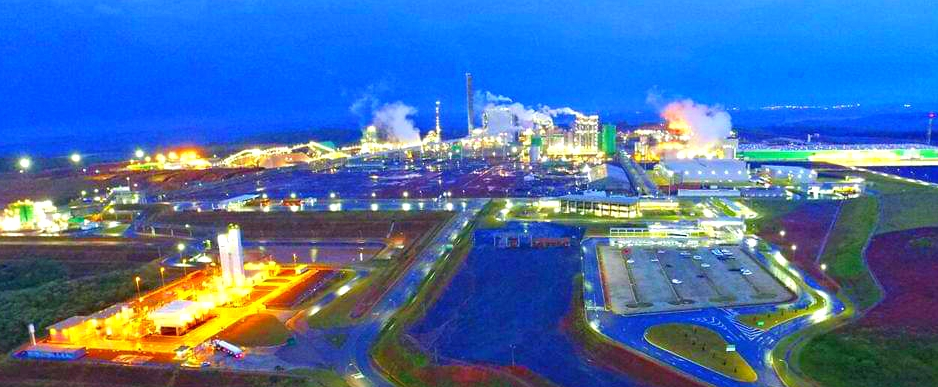
Night view of the industrial complex at the Puma Unit, in Ortigueira, Parana.

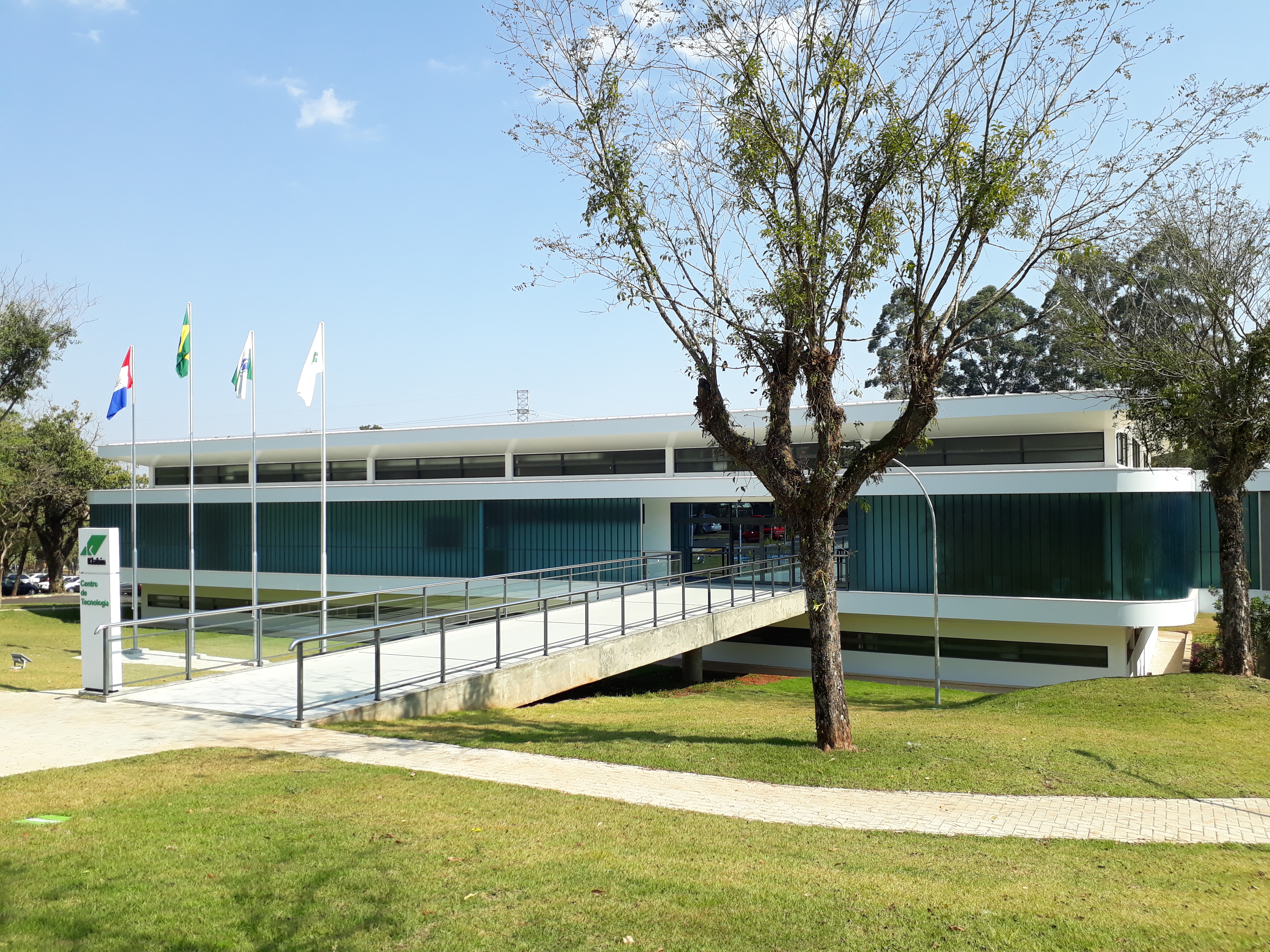
Klabin's Technology Center in Telemaco Borba.

In June 2017, Klabin's Technology Center was inaugurated in Telemaco Borba, with the objective of creating new technologies of high complexity and sustainable applications, enabling the integration of the research and development fronts of the company's business areas. The laboratories produce forest-based products and carry out simulations of the factories' production lines, complying with the company's investment plan in research, development, and innovation. In 2018, Klabin announced the acquisition of 12.5% of Israeli startup Melodea Bio Based Solutions, targeting nanocrystalline cellulose (CNC) extraction technology.

In May 2019, the company started the expansion of the Puma Unit in Ortigueira, with the Puma II project. In total, it is estimated that the investment will be 9.1 billion reais in the expansion of the plant with two new machines, creating between 11 and 12 thousand jobs during the construction period.

=== 2020s ===
In March 2020, Klabin expanded its packaging sector by buying the Brazilian packaging division of competitor International Paper, which represented an increase of 310 thousand tons/year. The units located in Suzano, Franco da Rocha and Paulínia (São Paulo); Manaus (Amazonas) and Rio Verde (Goiás) were acquired. The Nova Campina unit, which was included in the negotiation, was sold to the Klingele Paper & Packaging Group.

Also in 2020, Klabin incorporated Sogemar and ended the dispute involving the payment of royalties to the Lafer-Klabin family for the use of the "Klabin" brand. In the same year, the company's net revenue reached 11.9 billion reais and Ebitda increased 14%, to 4.9 billion reais.

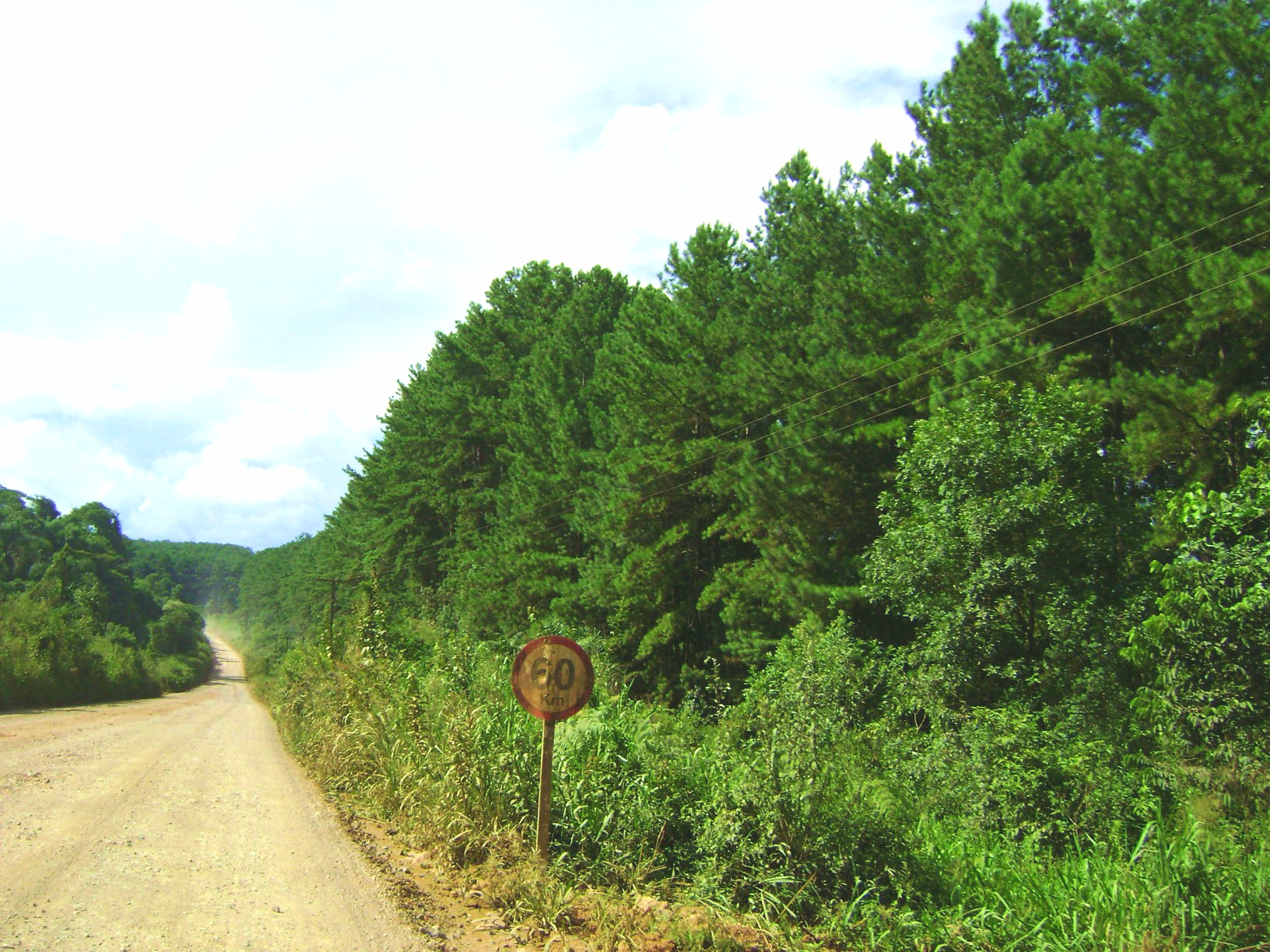
Klabin's reforestation on the margins of Miranda Road, in Telemaco Borba.

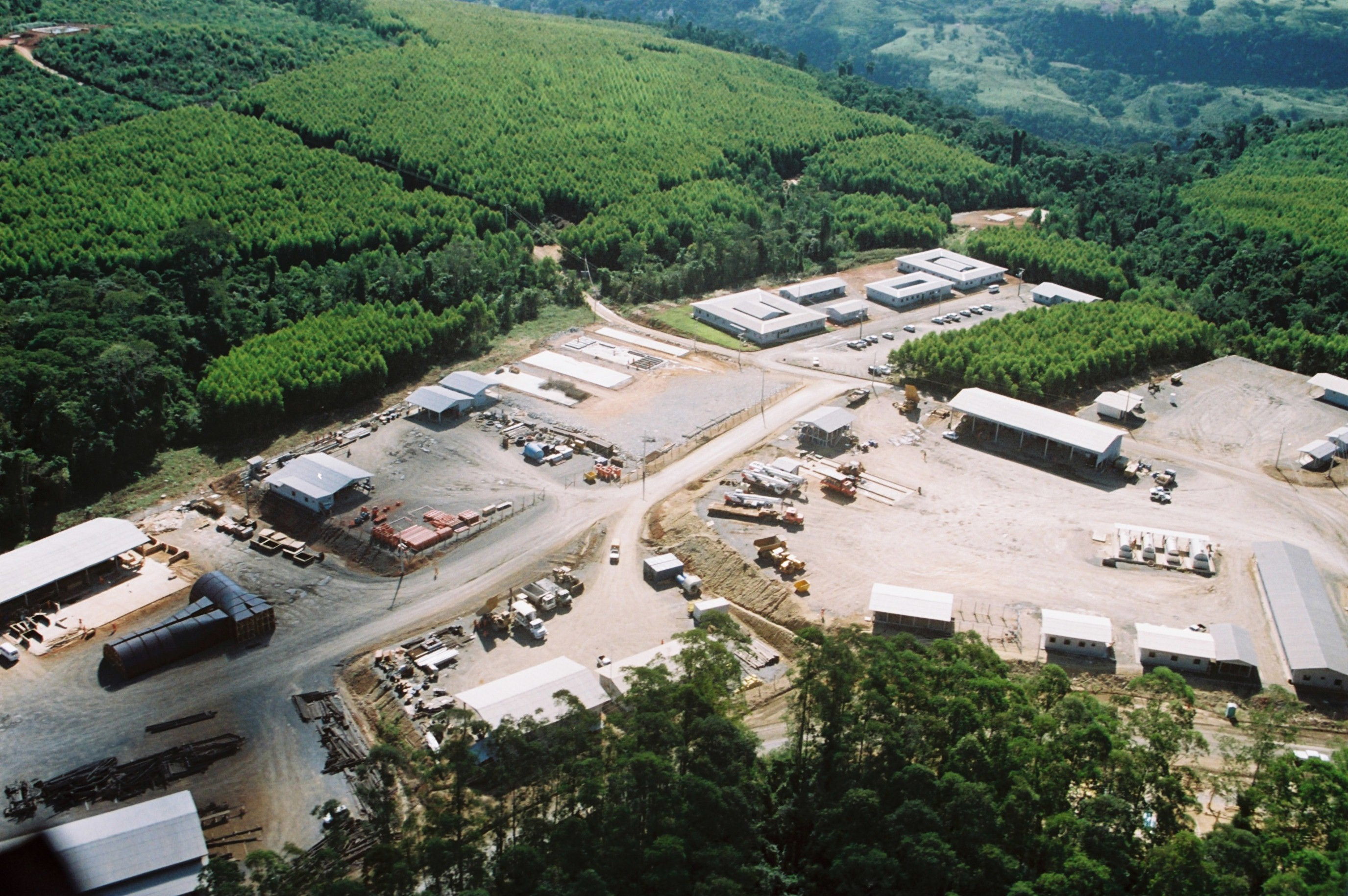
Klabin's reforestation in Telemaco Borba.

In February 2021 the National Bank for Economic and Social Development (BNDES) sold on the stock exchange 21 million units of Klabin, which represented about 25% of its stake in the company's capital. The BNDES raised 598.1 million reais and still holds a 5.4% stake in Klabin's capital. In May 2021, Klabin announced an additional investment of 2.6 billion reais in the Puma II project at the Puma Unit; the total investment in this project resulted in 12.9 billion reais.

In August 2021, Klabin started operating one of the machines (MP27) of the Puma Unit expansion project. The new line produces unbleached pulp integrated to the kraftliner and white kraftliner paper machine with a capacity of 450 thousand tons/year. The product was named Eukaliner, and is considered the world's first kraftliner paper produced from 100% eucalyptus fibers. The MP28 machine, on the other hand, should start operating in 2023, focused on the production of paperboard and with a production capacity of 460 thousand tons/year. The new operations consolidate Klabin as a major producer of packaging for liquid foods and processed foods, packaging for hygiene and cleaning products, and multipack packaging for cans and bottles, as well as packaging for the food service segment, such as cups and trays.

== Enterprises and acknowledgment ==
Klabin Irmãos & Cia (KIC) is a family-owned holding company founded in 1899 by the Klabin and Lafer families of Jewish-Lithuanian origin, which controls the Klabin Group and owns Klabin S.A. (forestry, pulp, paper and converting), among other investments. The holding company originated in 1890 with the founding of M. F. Klabin & Irmão by Maurício Freeman Klabin. In recent years, Klabin has become the 3rd largest company in Parana and one of the ten largest in the southern region of Brazil. The company also appears in the ranking as one of the largest business groups in the country. Regarding the year 2015, the company had a turnover of 5.6 billion reais. In 2019, its Weighted Value of Grandeur (VPG) index was calculated at 7.43 billion reais.

The activities developed by the company in Telemaco Borba placed the city as the largest wood producer in Parana and the third largest in Brazil, with 165,300 hectares dedicated to the activity. In 2018, Telemaco Borba was the largest generator of wealth from forestry in Brazil, presenting the highest value of production in the country, with 326.9 million reais. The city of Ortigueira, meanwhile, with most of the forest areas owned by Klabin, had, in 2018, an area of 93.8 thousand hectares dedicated to wood production, making it the seventh largest wood-producing municipality in Brazil.

The Group also sells, on a smaller scale, wood in logs and biomass. Among other projects, it maintains the Ikapê Hotel (Ikapê Empreendimentos Ltda.), in the district of Harmonia, in Telêmaco Borba, Paraná. The space is intended for hotel activity, catering and specialized gastronomy, tourism exploration and event promotion.

In Paranaguá, also in Paraná, Klabin maintains the Unidade de Logística de Papel e Celulose, integrated with rail and road moulds, with a handling capacity of 1.5 million tons of pulp per year. With 24,000 m^{2} of built area, the unit inaugurated in 2016 is entirely dedicated to the flow of short fiber pulp production for export.

Throughout its history, Klabin has been diversifying and changing its area of operation, including mining, energy production and distribution, transportation and logistics, research and innovation, technology production and development, environmental solutions and cultural activities.

=== Klabin Irmãos & Cia ===
Klabin Irmãos & Cia (KIC) is a family-owned holding company founded in 1899 by the Klabin and Lafer families of Jewish-Lithuanian origin, which controls the Klabin Group and owns Klabin S.A. (forestry, pulp, paper and converting), among other investments. The holding company originated in 1890 with the founding of M. F. Klabin & Irmão by Maurício Freeman Klabin.
