= Eros Araújo =

Brazilian politician

- Preceded by: Carlos Hugo Wolff von Graffen
- Succeeded by: Luiz Carlos Gibson

Personal details
- Born: November 6, 1956 (age 69) Rio Bom
- Party: Brazilian Democratic Movement Party (PMDB)
- Occupation: Politician

Eros Danilo Araújo (born November 6, 1956, in Rio Bom, Paraná) is a Brazilian politician, former mayor of Telêmaco Borba, municipality in the state of Paraná in the Southern Region of Brazil.

His term as mayor ended in 2012. He is a physician trained at the UFPR - Federal University of Paraná. He is from the Brazilian Democratic Movement Party (PMDB).
