= Presidente Vargas Hydroelectric Plant =

Presidente Vargas Dam
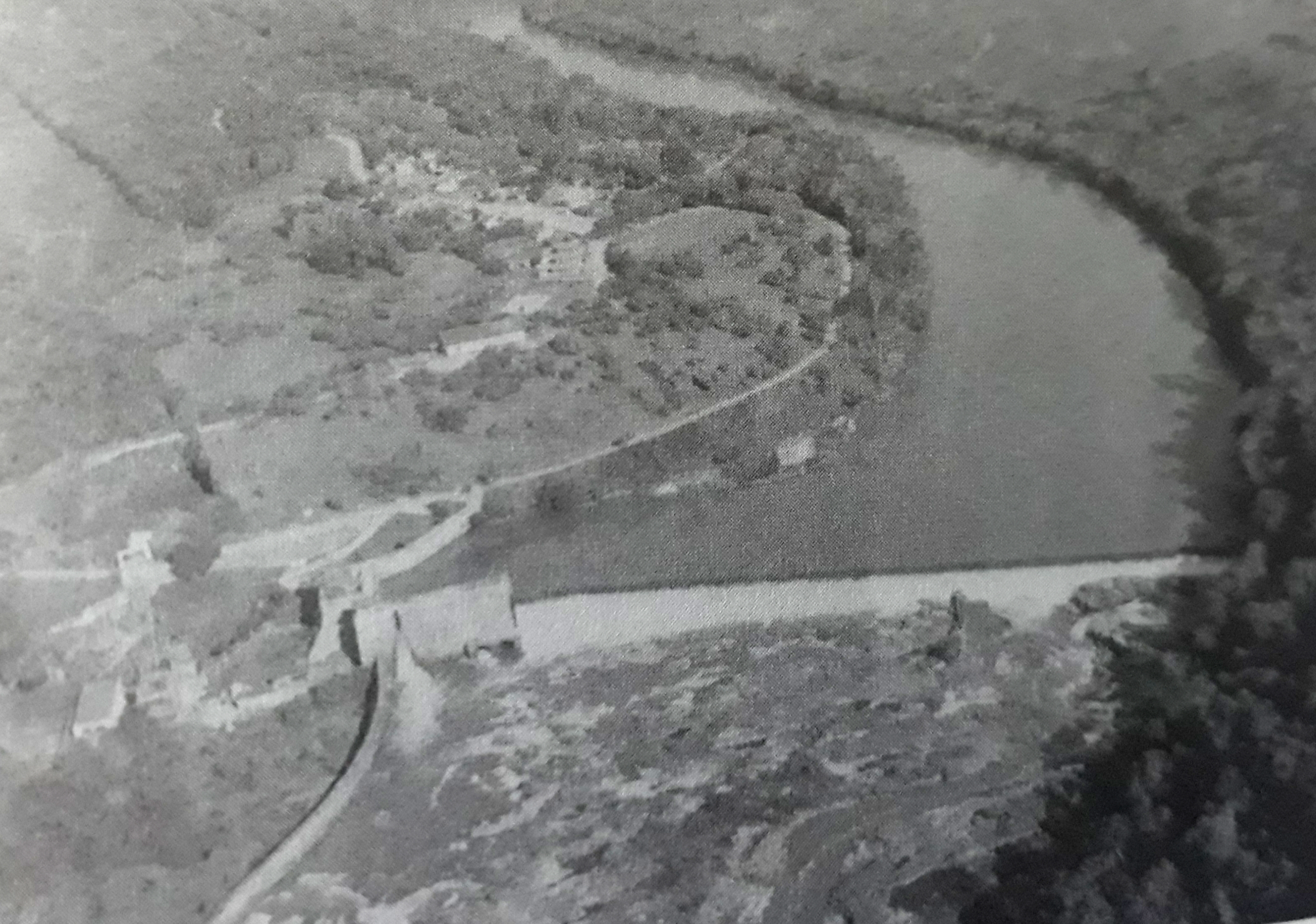
- Official name: Presidente Vargas Hydroelectric Plant
- Location: Telêmaco Borba, Paraná, Brazil
- Construction began: ?
- Opening date: 1953
- Construction cost: ?

Dam and spillways
- Type of dam: Gravity, roller-compacted concrete
- Impounds: Tibagi River
- Spillway type: Service, controlled

Reservoir
- Creates: Presidente Vargas Reservoir
- Surface area: ?

Power Station
- Installed capacity: 22,5 MW

The Presidente Vargas Hydroelectric Plant, is a dam and hydroelectric power plant on the Tibagi River in Telêmaco Borba in Paraná, Brazil.

== See also ==
- List of power stations in Brazil
