= Macopa =

Macopa may refer to:

- Macopa, Telêmaco Borba
- Macopa, see Syzygium samarangense
