= Márcio Matos =

Brazilian physician and politician

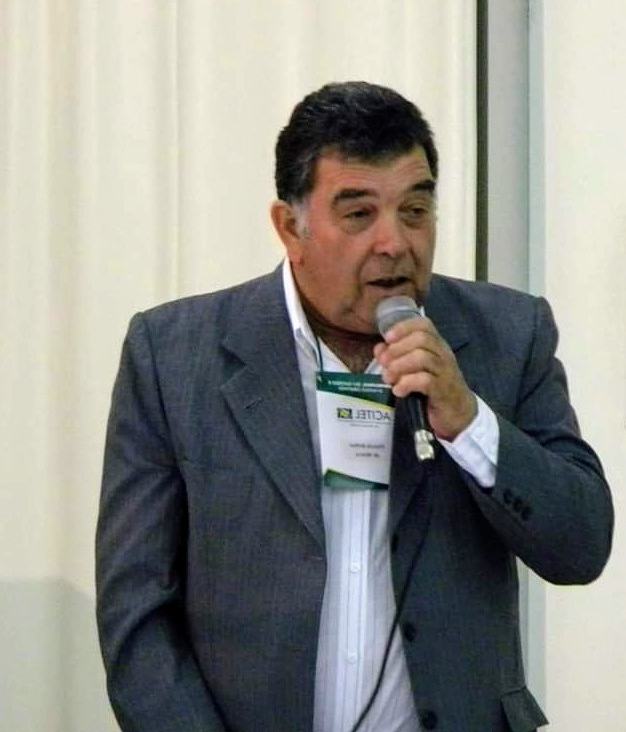
- Márcio Artur de Matos, physician and Brazilian politician.

Mayor of Telêmaco Borba
- Incumbent
- Assumed office 1 January 2017
- Vice-Mayor: Rita Mara de Paula Araújo
- Preceded by: Luiz Carlos Gibson

Federal Deputy for Paraná
- In office 5 January 1999 – 31 January 2003

Alderman of Telêmaco Borba
- In office 1 January 1993 – 31 December 1996

Personal details
- Born: March 29, 1946 (age 80) Mineiros do Tietê, São Paulo
- Party: PDT (2009-present)
- Other political affiliations: PTB (2001-2009); PT (1993-2000); MDB (1992-1993)
- Occupation: politician

Márcio Artur de Matos (born March 29, 1946, in Mineiros do Tietê, São Paulo) is a Brazilian politician, current mayor of Telêmaco Borba, municipality in the state of Paraná in the Southern Region of Brazil.

He is a physician trained at the Federal University of São Paulo. He is from the Democratic Labour Party (PDT). He was alderman and federal deputy.
