= Socomim =

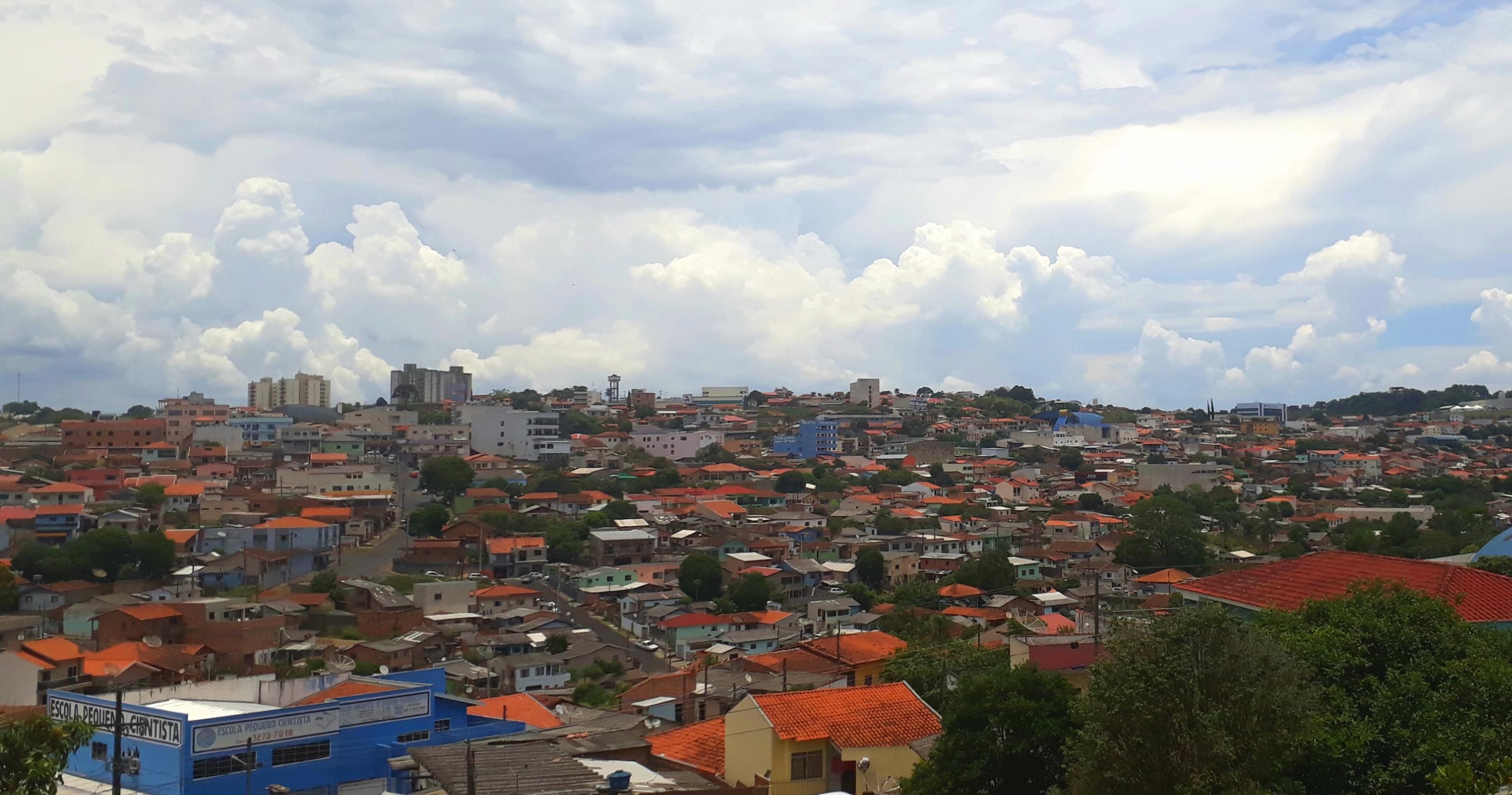
- Country: Brazil
- Region: South
- State: Paraná
- Municipality: Telêmaco Borba

Socomim is a neighbourhood at center of the city of Telêmaco Borba, Brazil.
