= Faculdade de Telêmaco Borba =

FATEB
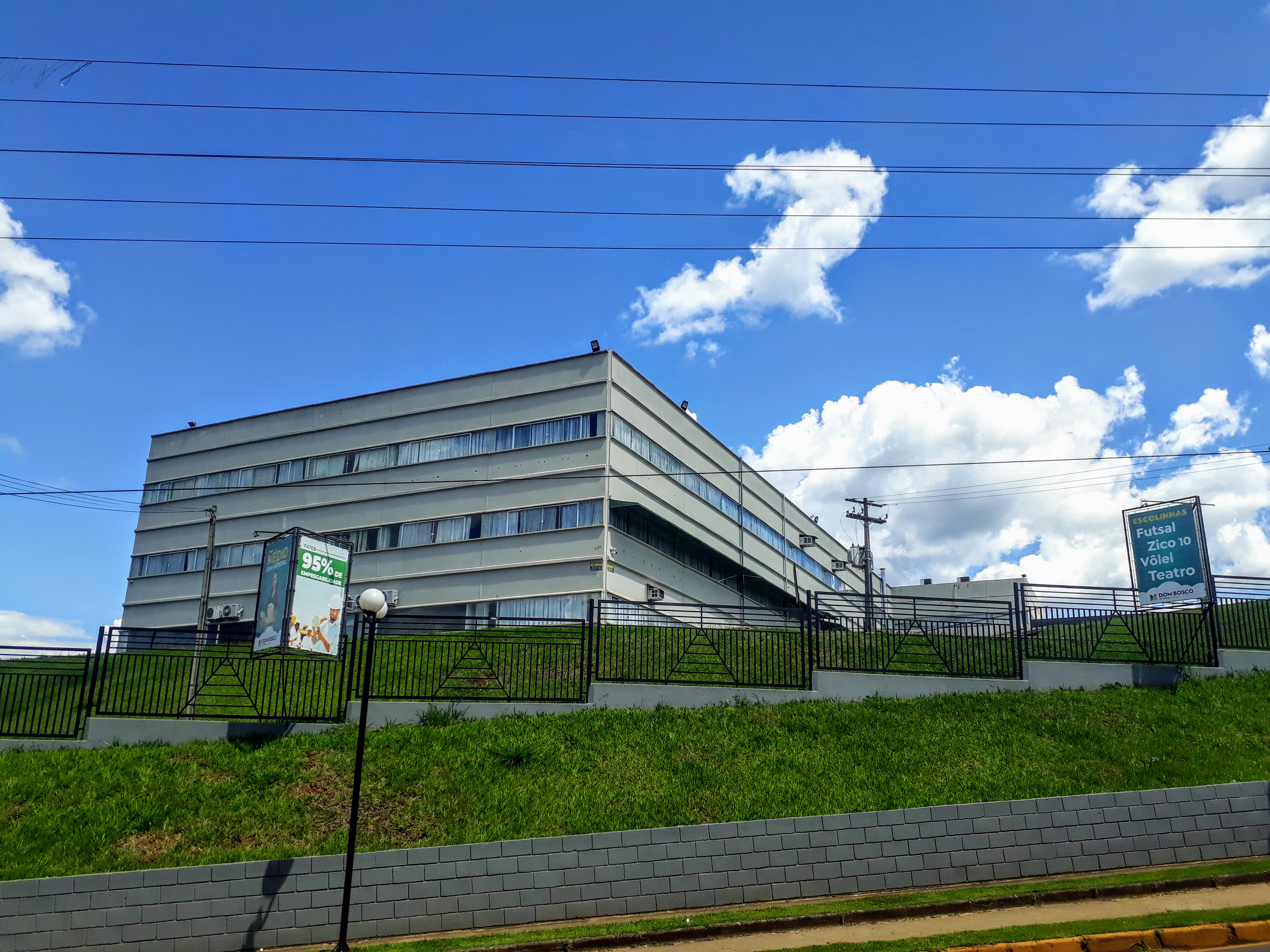
- Type: Private
- Established: December 20, 2000
- Location: Telêmaco Borba, Paraná, Brazil; 24°20′05.6″S 50°38′26″W
- Campus: Urban
- Website: afaculdade.fatebtb.edu.br

Faculdade de Telêmaco Borba (abbreviated FATEB) is a Brazilian Higher Education institution, based in Telêmaco Borba, Paraná (state). It was founded in 2000.
