= Telêmaco Borba Cable Car =

Gondola lift service operating in the entral region of Telêmaco Borba

- Bonde Aéreo de Telêmaco Borba
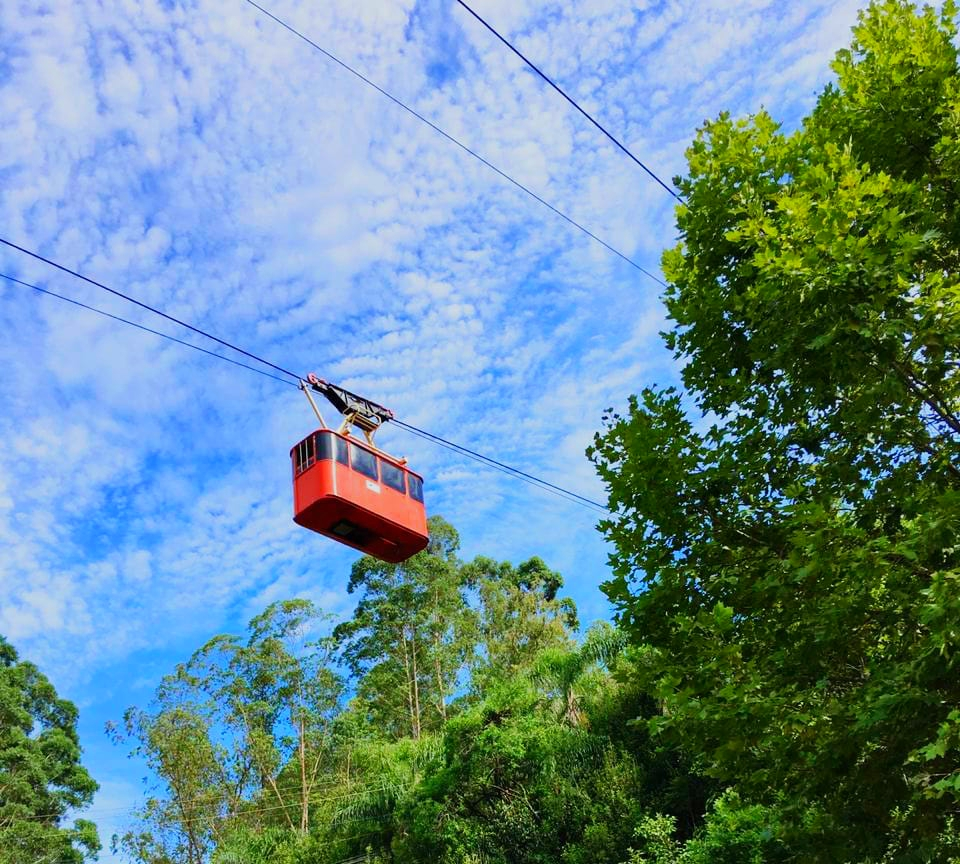
- Telêmaco Borba Cable Car
- Interactive map of Telêmaco Borba Cable Car

Overview
- Status: Operational
- Location: Telêmaco Borba, Paraná
- Country: Brazil
- Coordinates: 24.3188°S 50.6173°W
- Open: 11 November 1959; 66 years ago

Telêmaco Borba Cable Car is a gondola lift service operating in the entral region of Telêmaco Borba, Paraná, Brazil.

The cable car runs between Telêmaco Borba and Harmonia (neighborhood). Is managed by the company Klabin.

Opened in 1959, the cable car originally served to transport employees and local residents to a paper mill. The cabin offers a view of the city, the Tibagi River and the Klabin factories. During its existence, the cable car has transported more than 54 million passengers.

== See also ==
- Sugarloaf Cable Car
