= Federal Institute of Paraná =

Brazilian academic institution

Instituto Federal de Educação, Ciência e Tecnologia do Paraná
- Type: Public university
- Established: December 29, 2008
- Rector: Irineu Mário Colombo
- Location: Curitiba, and other 13 cities, Paraná, Brazil
- Campus: Urban
- Website: www.ifpr.edu.br

The Instituto Federal de Educação, Ciência e Tecnologia do Paraná (IFPR) (Paraná Federal Institute of Education, Science and Technology), also known as the late Escola Técnica da Universidade Federal do Paraná (ET-UFPR), is an institution that offers high and professional educations by having a pluricurricular form. It is an multicampi institution, specialized in offering professional and technological education in different areas of knowledge (biology, humanities, and STEM disciplines).

The IFPR is a public federal institution, directly bound to the Ministry of Education of Brazil.

== Campuses ==
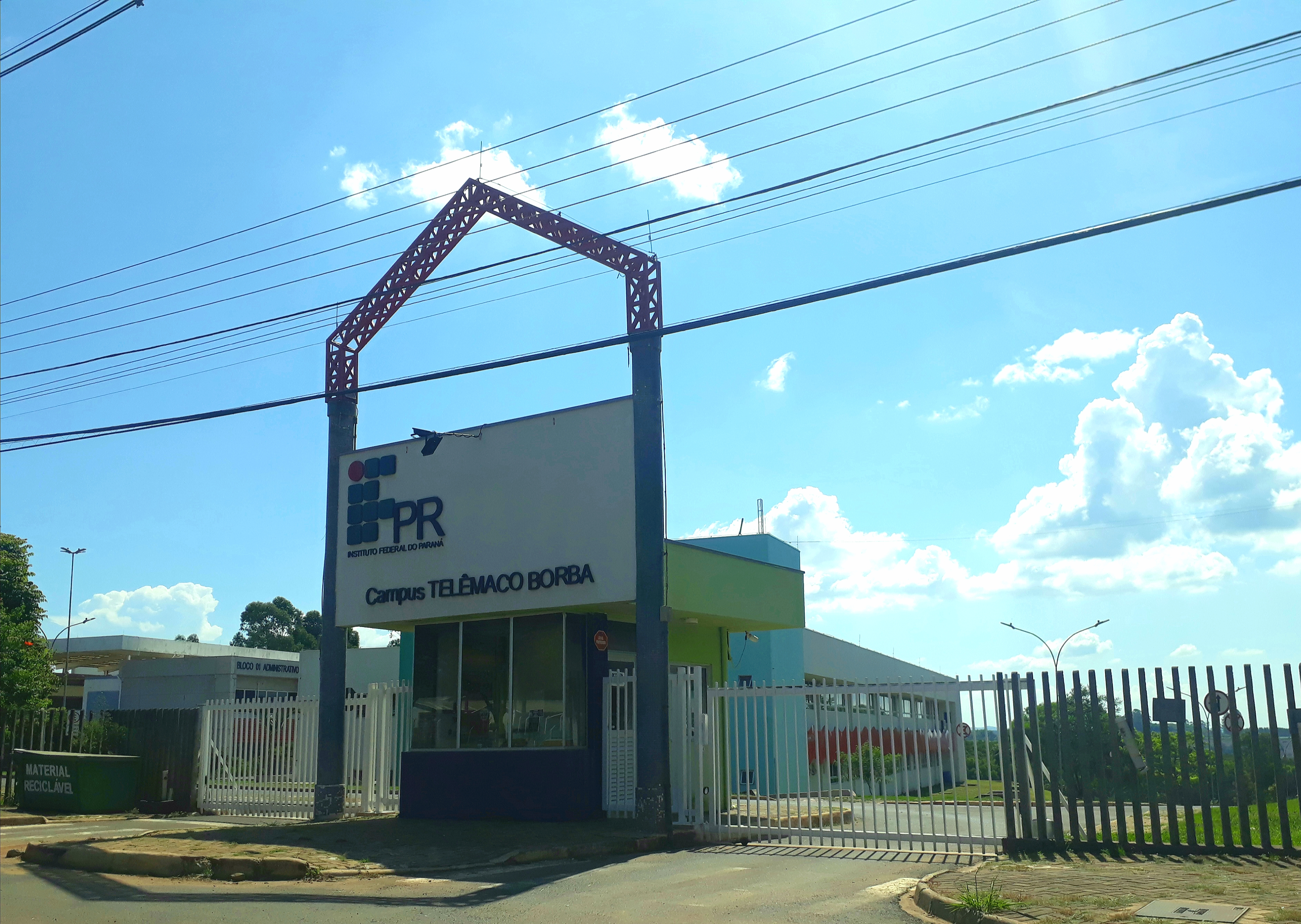
IFPR campus of Telêmaco Borba.

- Curitiba
- Assis Chateaubriand
- Cascavel
- Campo Largo
- Foz do Iguaçu
- Irati
- Ivaiporã
- Jacarezinho
- Londrina
- Palmas
- Paranaguá
- Paranavaí
- Pinhais
- Telêmaco Borba
- Umuarama

== See also ==
- Federal University of Paraná
- Federal University of Technology - Paraná
