= Harmonia River =

River in Brazil

Location
- Country: Brazil

Physical characteristics
- Source
  - location: Paraná state
- Mouth: Tibagi River
  - coordinates: 24°19′S 50°36′W

The Harmonia River is a river of Paraná state in southern Brazil.

It is a tributary of the Tibagi River.

== See also ==
- List of rivers of Paraná
