= Telêmaco Borba =

Coordinates: 24°21′S 50°37′W

- Municipality
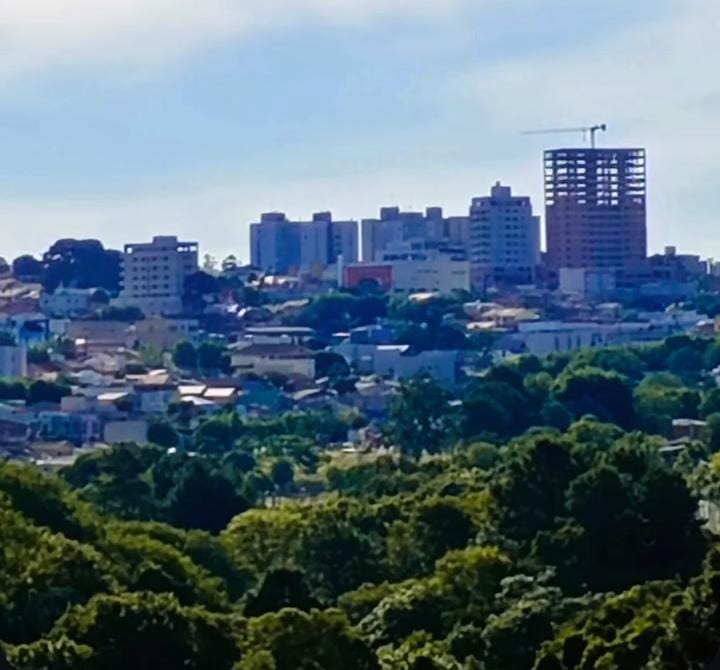
- Telêmaco Borba city.

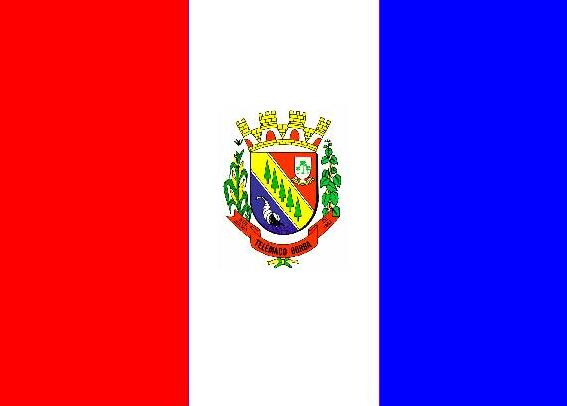
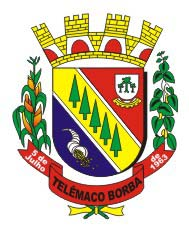
- Flag Coat of arms
- Nickname: Capital do Papel
- Interactive map of Telêmaco Borba
- Country: Brazil
- Region: Southern
- State: Paraná
- Mesoregion: Centro Oriental Paranaense

Government
  - Mayor: Márcio Matos

Population (2020)
  - Total: 79,792
- Time zone: UTC -3

Telêmaco Borba is a municipality in the state of Paraná in the Southern Region of Brazil.

Telêmaco Borba is known as the "capital of paper" (Capital do Papel) and "capital of wood" (Capital da Madeira) due to the importance of paper and wood production to the local economy, with reforestation for growing pine and eucalyptus that reaches 90% of the agricultural area of the municipality.

== City ==
Telêmaco Borba is the second largest city in Campos Gerais, it had a population of 79,792 in 2020, according to the estimate. Telêmaco Borba is highly urbanised, since only 2,400 residents live in the countryside.

The city was founded because of Klabin Papel e Celulose Industry in the early 1940s. Their factory is the largest producer, exporter and recycler of paper in Brazil.

Today, the city is the 6th largest Industrial Center in Paraná, due to its paper and lumber sector. Telêmaco Borba is a national reference in this sector, and has an industrial park that holds 80 companies with diversified activities. It is also an important regional center in many areas, like health and education.

== History ==
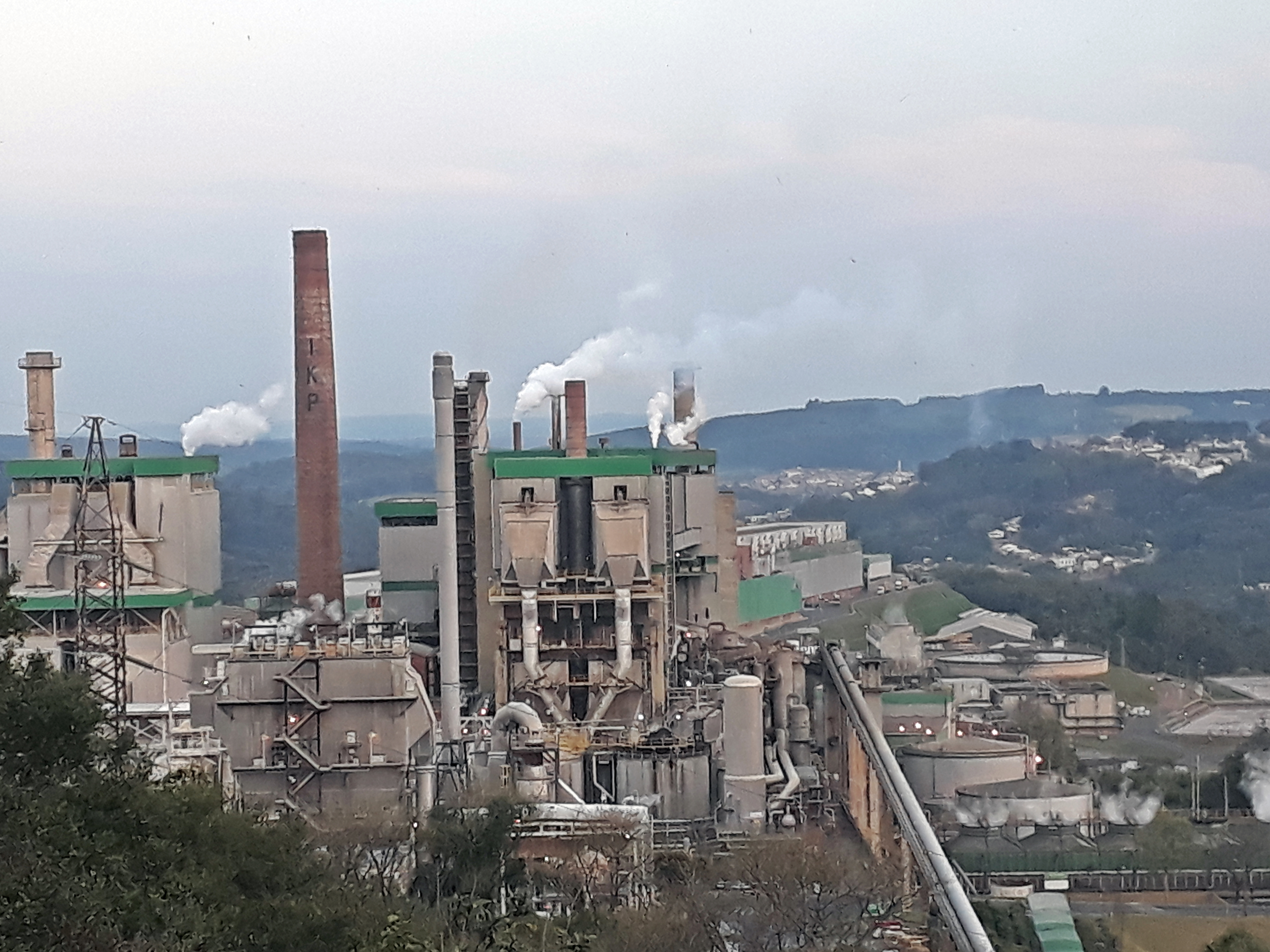
Klabin Monte Alegre plant, in Telêmaco Borba.

With the installation of Klabin Industries in Tibagi, encampments arose as Harmonia, Lagoa, Antas, Maua, Mandaçaia, Miranda, Mirandinha. Klabin later bought the land on the left bank of the Tibagi River, the facilities front of Paper Mill and Pulp. Klabin, created the Cia. Territorial Tibagi Valley, which was responsible for urban development and subdivision of land.

The new residents, the vast majority of employees Klabin, started calling the town of New Town. The New Town was an early development than on July 25, 1960 signed by the governor Moyses Lupion, was elevated to a municipality under the name of Telêmaco Borba, with territory taken from the municipality of Tibagi.

However, the city was never even installed, since the Legislative Assembly of the State of Paraná, revoked item IV of article 1 of Law No. 4245, of July 25, 1960 and therefore was extinguished municipality of Telêmaco Borba, returning to the status of mere district with territory belonging to the municipality of Tibagi again, and resuming its former name of New Town.

By State Law No. 4,445, of October 16, 1961, the Administrative District of New Town was created in the municipality of Tibagi. On July 5, 1963, by State Law No. 4738, signed by the governor Ney Aminthas de Barros Braga, the district was elevated to municipality emancipated, with territory taken from the municipality of Tibagy, but with the name changed again to definitely Telêmaco Borba. The county name is a tribute to Colonel Telêmaco Augusto Enéas Morosini Borba.

== Geography ==
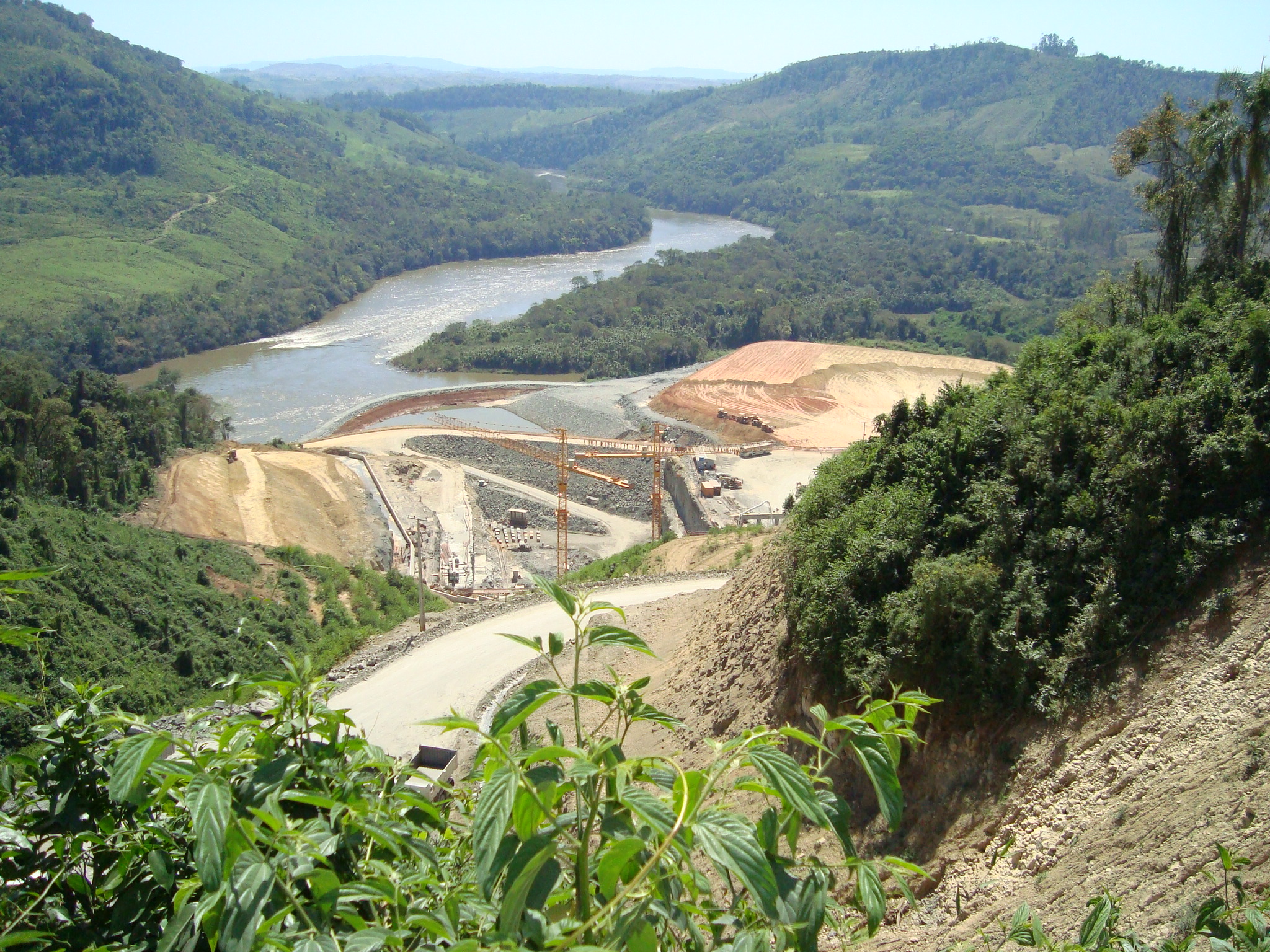
Tibagi River in Telêmaco Borba.

=== Hydrography ===
- Alegre River
- Das Antas River (Tibagi River)
- Faisqueira River
- Harmonia River
- Imbaú River
- Imbaúzinho River
- Quebra-perna River
- Tibagi River

=== Neighbourhoods ===
- Alto das Oliveiras
- Nossa Senhora de Fátima
- Nossa Senhora do Perpétuo Socorro
- Macopa
- Socomim
- Triângulo

=== Climate ===
Telêmaco Borba is classified as oceanic climate (Köppen climate classification: Cfb). In summer the temperature rises to 27 °C (81 °F). In winter, the temperature reaches to 18 °C (64 °F). The rainy season is from September to April. Frosts are common in winter.

Climate data for Telêmaco Borba, elevation 768 m (2,520 ft), (1977–2015)
Month	Jan	Feb	Mar	Apr	May	Jun	Jul	Aug	Sep	Oct	Nov	Dec	Year
Record high °C (°F)	36.4 (97.5)	36.0 (96.8)	35.5 (95.9)	32.8 (91.0)	30.4 (86.7)	27.8 (82.0)	29.6 (85.3)	33.0 (91.4)	34.5 (94.1)	35.4 (95.7)	38.2 (100.8)	34.5 (94.1)	38.2 (100.8)
Mean daily maximum °C (°F)	28.9 (84.0)	29.1 (84.4)	28.5 (83.3)	26.3 (79.3)	22.9 (73.2)	21.7 (71.1)	21.9 (71.4)	24.1 (75.4)	24.8 (76.6)	26.8 (80.2)	27.9 (82.2)	28.6 (83.5)	26.0 (78.7)
Daily mean °C (°F)	22.5 (72.5)	22.4 (72.3)	21.4 (70.5)	19.1 (66.4)	15.5 (59.9)	14.0 (57.2)	13.8 (56.8)	15.3 (59.5)	17.1 (62.8)	19.6 (67.3)	20.9 (69.6)	22.1 (71.8)	18.6 (65.6)
Mean daily minimum °C (°F)	18.0 (64.4)	18.0 (64.4)	16.7 (62.1)	14.2 (57.6)	10.6 (51.1)	9.0 (48.2)	8.3 (46.9)	9.1 (48.4)	11.5 (52.7)	14.2 (57.6)	15.6 (60.1)	17.2 (63.0)	13.5 (56.4)
Record low °C (°F)	9.4 (48.9)	9.9 (49.8)	4.2 (39.6)	2.0 (35.6)	−1.6 (29.1)	−5.0 (23.0)	−4.3 (24.3)	−2.3 (27.9)	−2.2 (28.0)	2.5 (36.5)	6.4 (43.5)	9.0 (48.2)	−5.0 (23.0)
Average precipitation mm (inches)	204.5 (8.05)	169.9 (6.69)	130.4 (5.13)	102.8 (4.05)	130.2 (5.13)	114.2 (4.50)	103.1 (4.06)	67.4 (2.65)	147.6 (5.81)	157.7 (6.21)	149.8 (5.90)	167.9 (6.61)	1,645.5 (64.79)
Average precipitation days (≥ 1.0 mm)	16	15	13	10	13	14	12	8	11	12	11	14	149
Average relative humidity (%)	79	80	79	81	83	84	81	76	75	75	74	76	79
Mean monthly sunshine hours	189.0	174.7	200.0	197.0	185.6	169.0	193.8	213.4	177.3	191.1	202.3	198.0	2,291.2
Source: IDR-Paraná

== Tourism ==
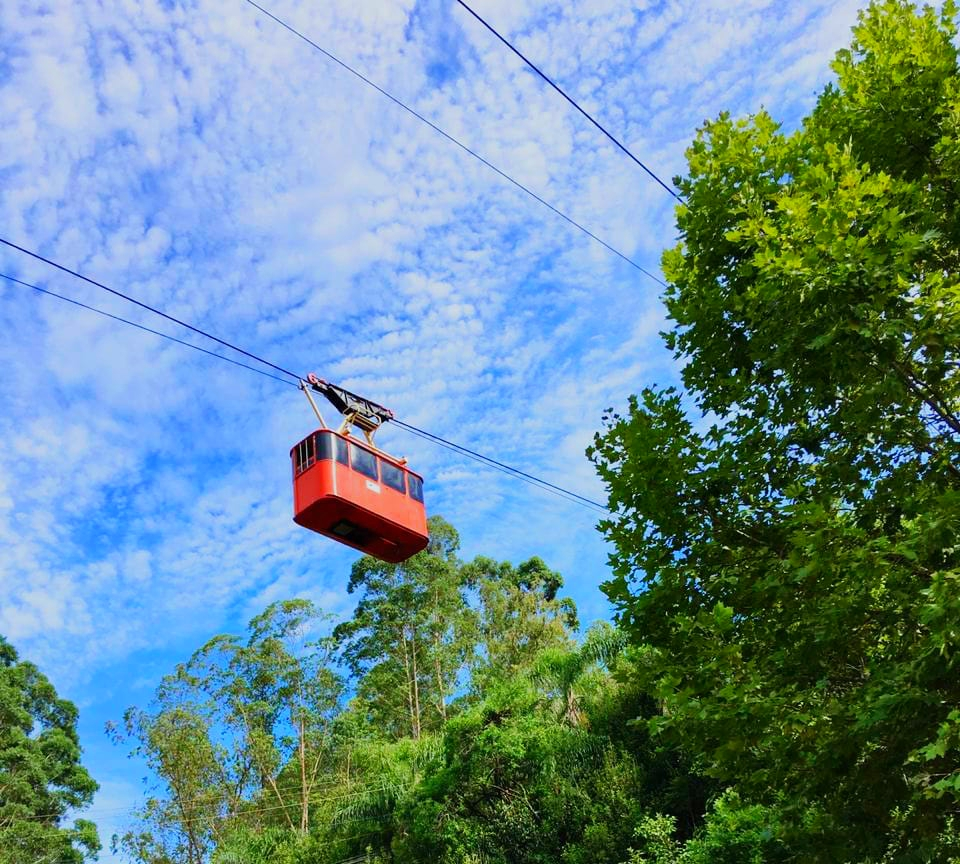
Telêmaco Borba Cable Car, air tram.

- Air tram Telemaco Borba (Cable Car)
- Harmonia Grove
- Municipal Environmental Park Pedro Cortez
- Municipal Tibagi River Park
- Samuel Klabin Ecological Park
- Luba Klabin Square (Praça dos Pinheiros)
- Square Dr. Horacio Klabin
- Interpretation Centre of Nature Frans Krajcbeg
- Craftsman House
- Quail White Sulfurosa Water Supply
- Catholic Church Nossa Senhora do Perpétuo Socorro
- Municipal Museum of Telemaco Borba
- Museum of Fauna and Flora
- Lake of the House of Culture Square
- Mandaçaia pond
- Mandaçaia cave
- Conceição of the jump
- Mauá Plant Dam

== Transportation ==
The city is served by Telêmaco Borba Airport.

=== Highways ===
- PR-160: Imbaú–Telêmaco Borba and Telêmaco Borba–Curiúva
- PR-340: Tibagi–Telêmaco Borba and Telêmaco Borba–Ortigueira
- PR-239: Ventania–Telêmaco Borba (Lagoa)
- BR-153: Tibagi–Ventania

== Education ==
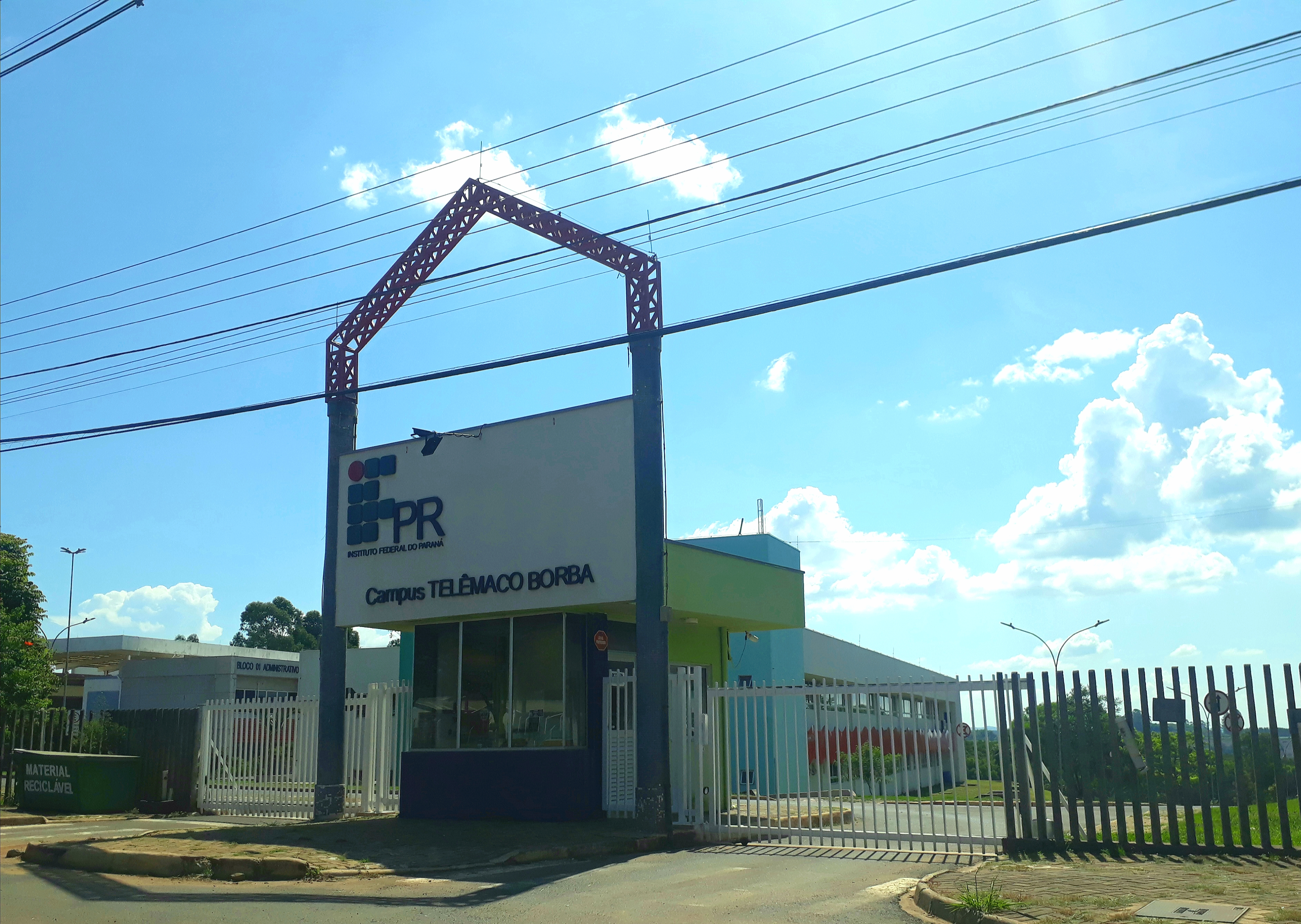
IFPR campus of Telêmaco Borba.

- Paraná Federal Institute of Education, Science and Technology (IFPR): Instituto Federal de Educação, Ciência e Tecnologia do Paraná: campus of Telêmaco Borba
- Ponta Grossa State University (UEPG) (Pt: Universidade Estadual de Ponta Grossa): campus of Telêmaco Borba
- Universidade Anhanguera (Uniderp): campus universitário of Telêmaco Borba
- Faculdade de Telêmaco Borba (Fateb): campus Carlos Hugo Wolff Von Graffen

== Notable people ==
- Thiago Kosloski, footballer
- Eliseu dos Santos, paralympic boccia player, Paralympic champion
- Mario Romancini, racing driver

== See also ==
- Klabin
- List of municipalities in Paraná
