= Triângulo, Telêmaco Borba =

Triângulo
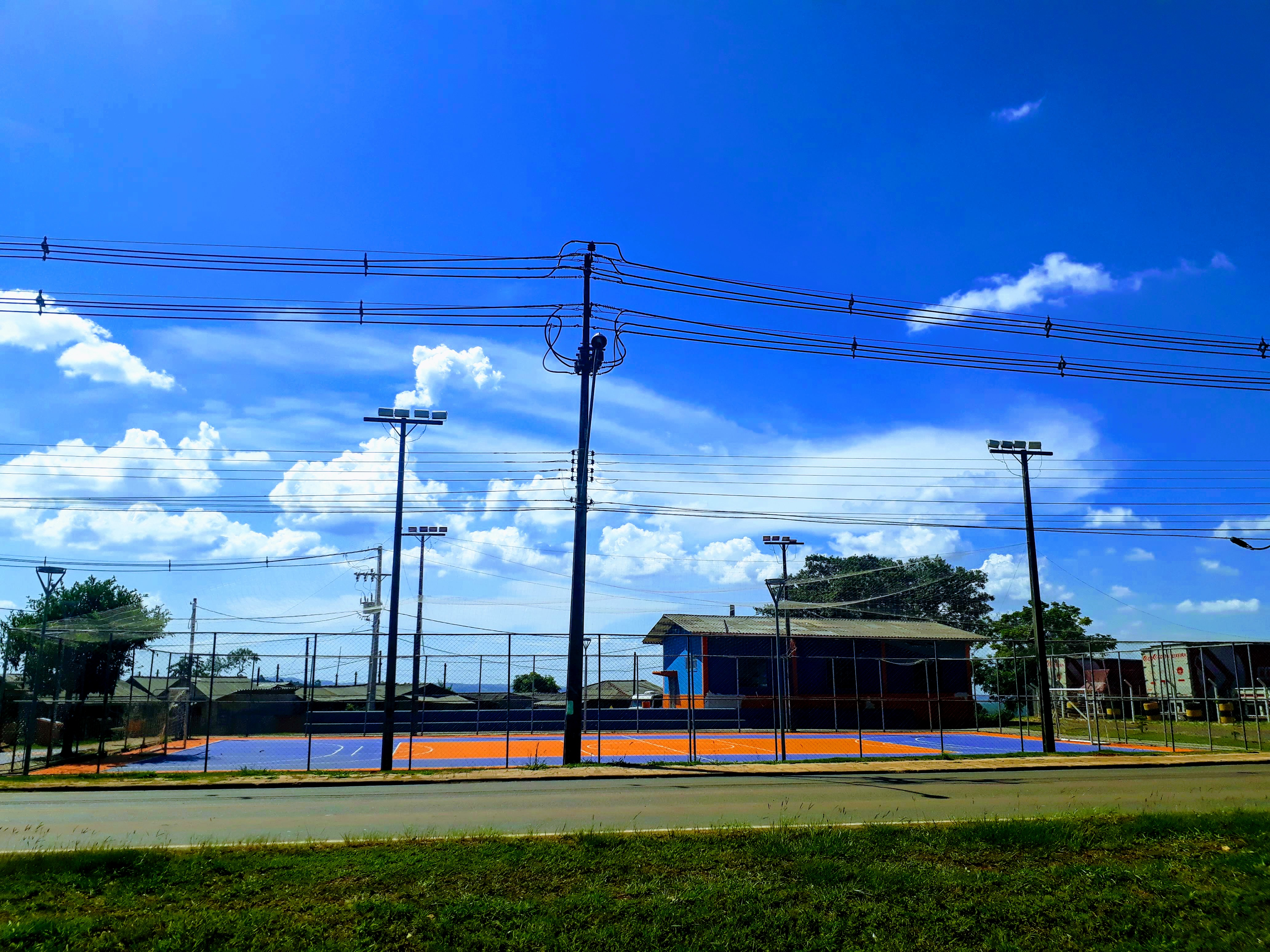
- A sports venue and community center in Triângulo.
- Interactive map of Triângulo
- Coordinates: 24°22′41.7″S 50°40′04.9″W
- Country: Brazil
- Region: South
- State: Paraná
- Municipality: Telêmaco Borba

Triângulo is a neighbourhood in the rural area of Telêmaco Borba, Brazil.
