= Macopa, Telêmaco Borba =

Macopa
- Country: Brazil
- Region: South
- State: Paraná
- Municipality: Telêmaco Borba

Macopa is a neighbourhood at center of the city of Telêmaco Borba, Brazil.
