= Bocaina do Sul =

- Municipality
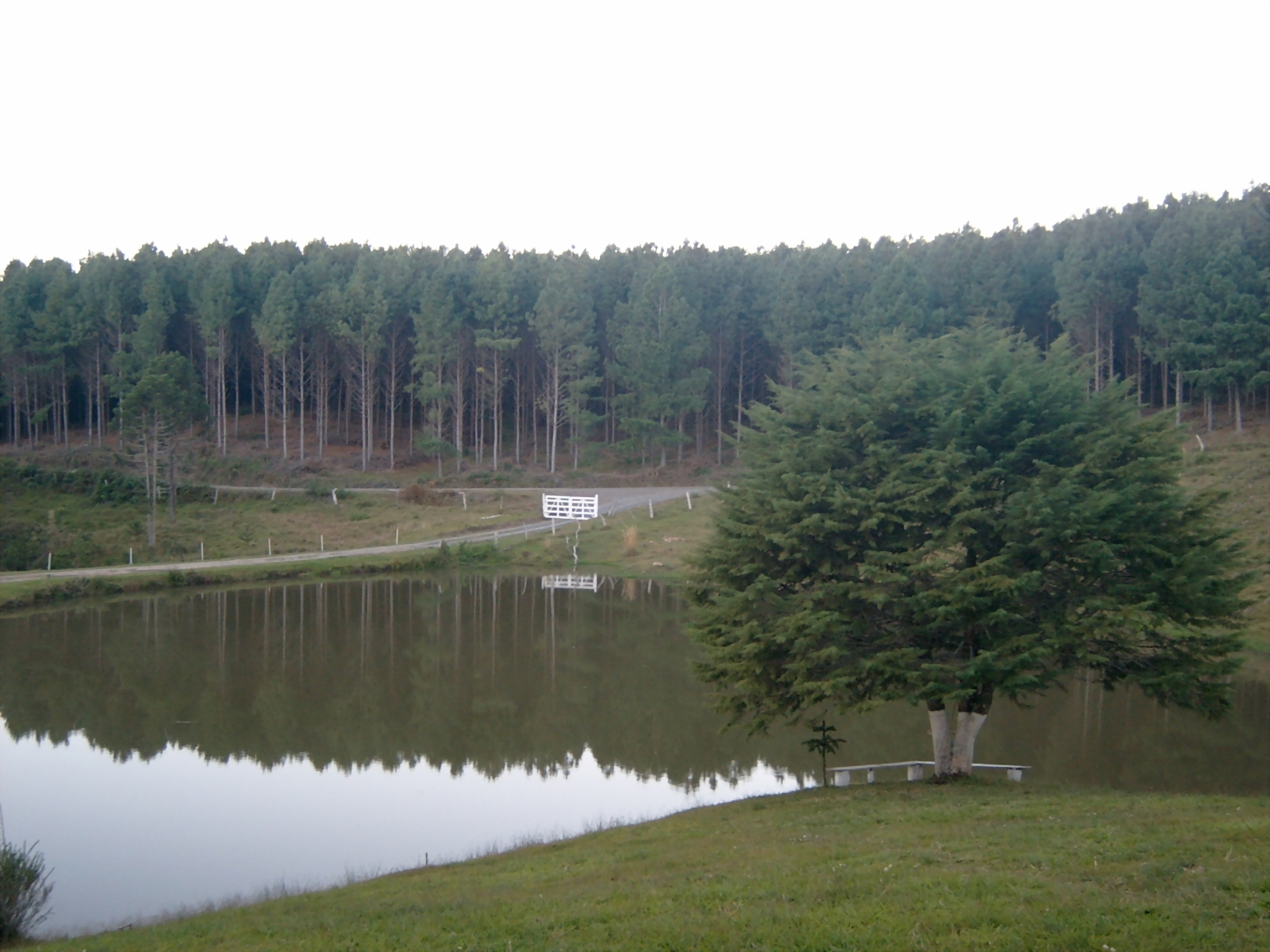

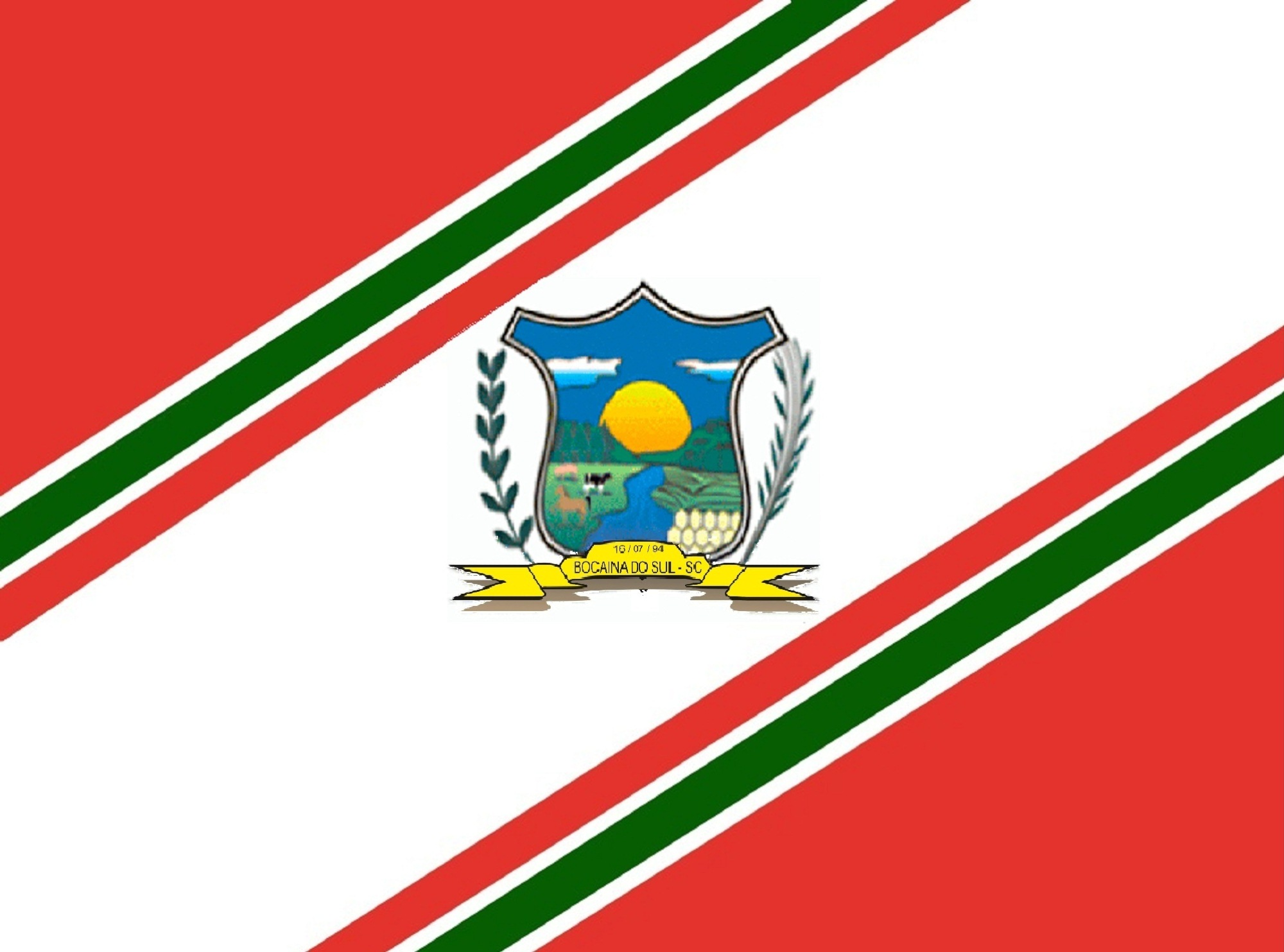
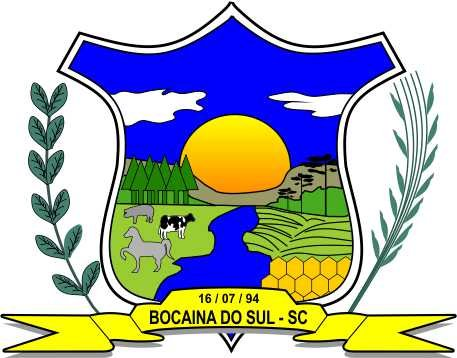
- Flag Coat of arms

- Location in Brazil
- Coordinates: 27°45′S 49°57′W
- Country: Brazil
- Region: South
- State: Santa Catarina
- Mesoregion: Serrana

Population (2020)
  - Total: 3,488
- Time zone: UTC -3

Bocaina do Sul is a municipality in the state of Santa Catarina in southern Brazil.

== See also ==
- List of municipalities in Santa Catarina
