= Rio Bom =

Coordinates: 23°46′S 51°25′W

- Municipality
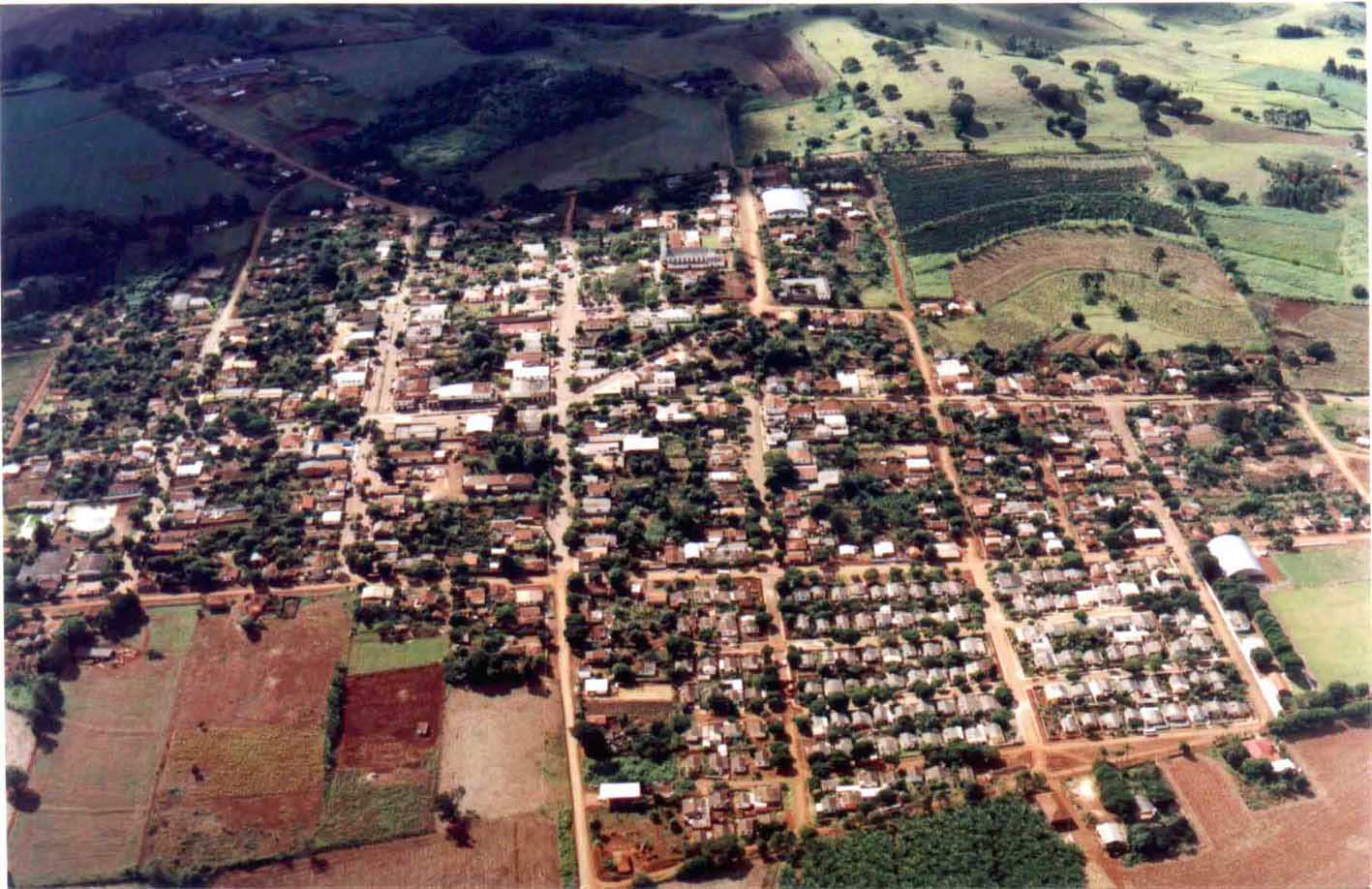
- Interactive map of Rio Bom
- Country: Brazil
- Region: Southern
- State: Paraná
- Mesoregion: Norte Central Paranaense

Population (2020)
  - Total: 3,182
- Time zone: UTC−3 (BRT)

Rio Bom is a municipality in the state of Paraná in the Southern Region of Brazil.

== See also ==
- List of municipalities in Paraná
