= Painel =

Coordinates: 27°55′S 50°06′W

- Municipality
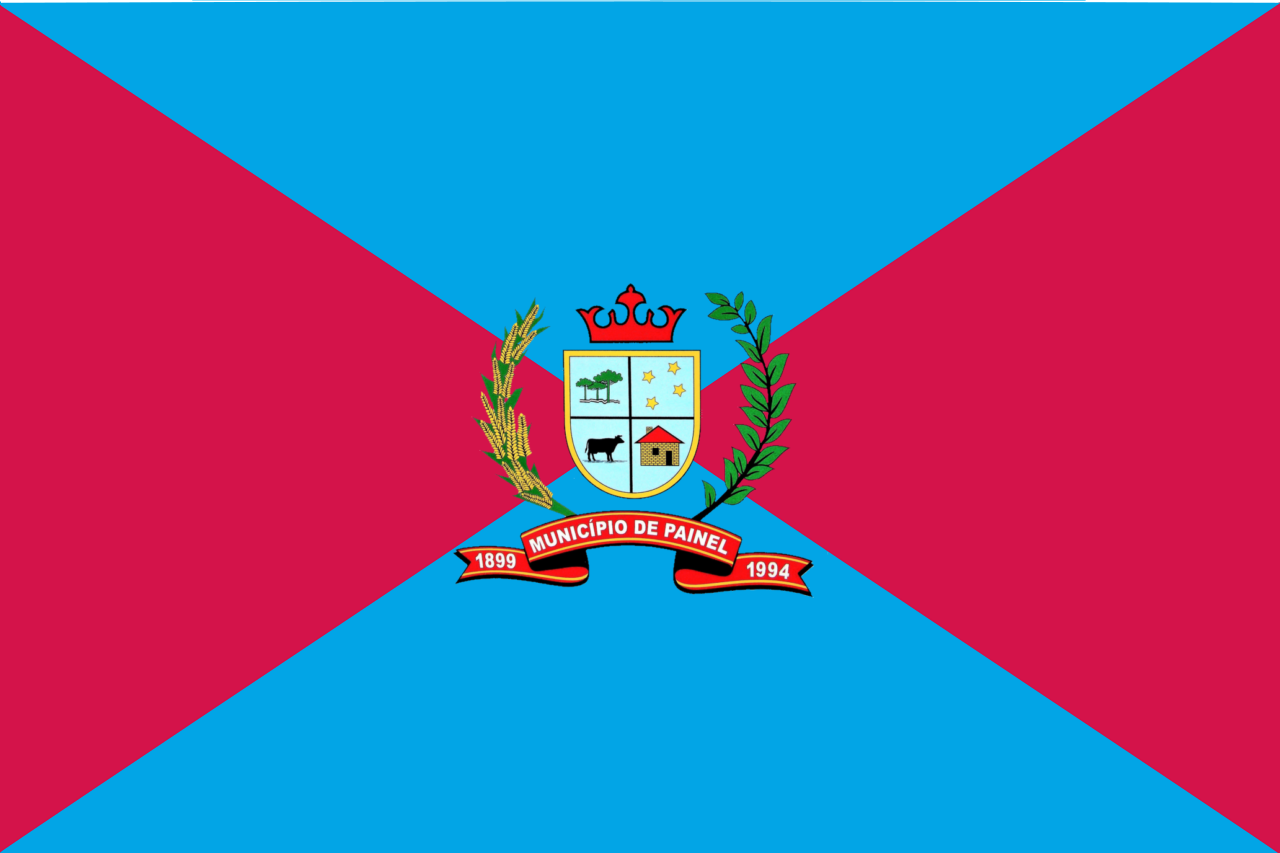
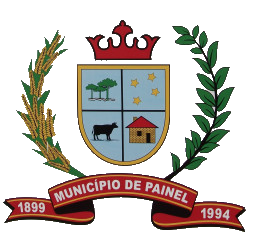
- Flag Coat of arms
- Interactive map of Painel
- Country: Brazil
- Region: South
- State: Santa Catarina
- Mesoregion: Serrana

Population (2020)
  - Total: 2,356
- Time zone: UTC -3

Painel is a municipality in the state of Santa Catarina in the South region of Brazil.

== See also ==
- List of municipalities in Santa Catarina
