= Rio Rufino =

Coordinates: 27°52′S 49°47′W

- Municipality
- Flag Coat of arms
- Interactive map of Rio Rufino
- Country: Brazil
- Region: South
- State: Santa Catarina
- Mesoregion: Serrana

Population (2020)
  - Total: 2,483
- Time zone: UTC -3

Rio Rufino is a municipality in the state of Santa Catarina in the South region of Brazil.

== See also ==
- List of municipalities in Santa Catarina
