= Tibagi River =

River in Brazil

Coordinates: 22°47′55″S 51°0′18″W

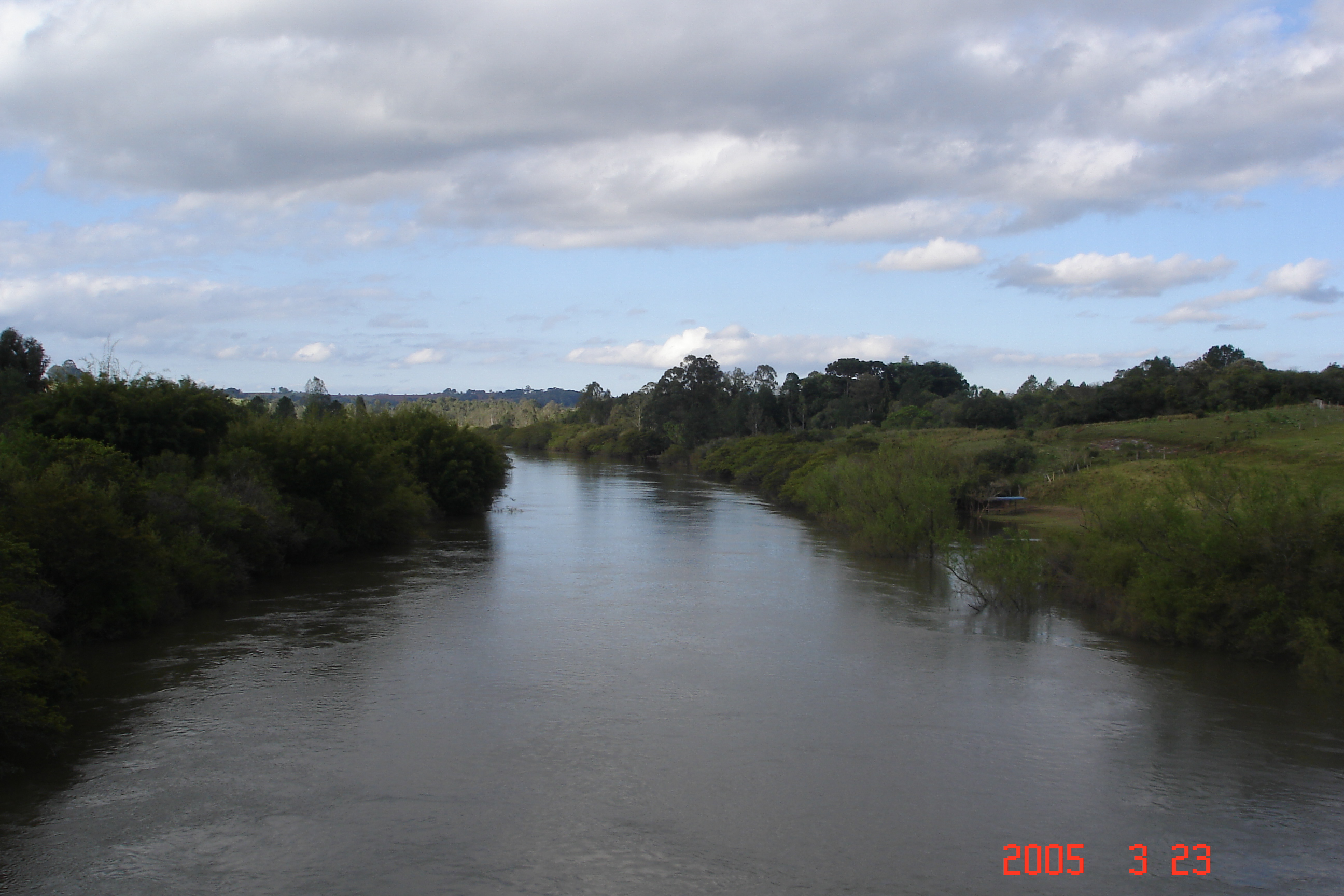
- Tibagi River

Location
- Country: Brazil

Physical characteristics
- Source
  - location: Paraná state
- Mouth
  - location: Paranapanema River

The Tibagi River (Portuguese, Rio Tibagi, also spelled Tibagy and Tibají) is a river of Paraná state in southern Brazil. It is a tributary of the Paranapanema River.

== See also ==
- List of rivers of Paraná
- List of tributaries of the Río de la Plata
