= São João do Triunfo =

- Municipality
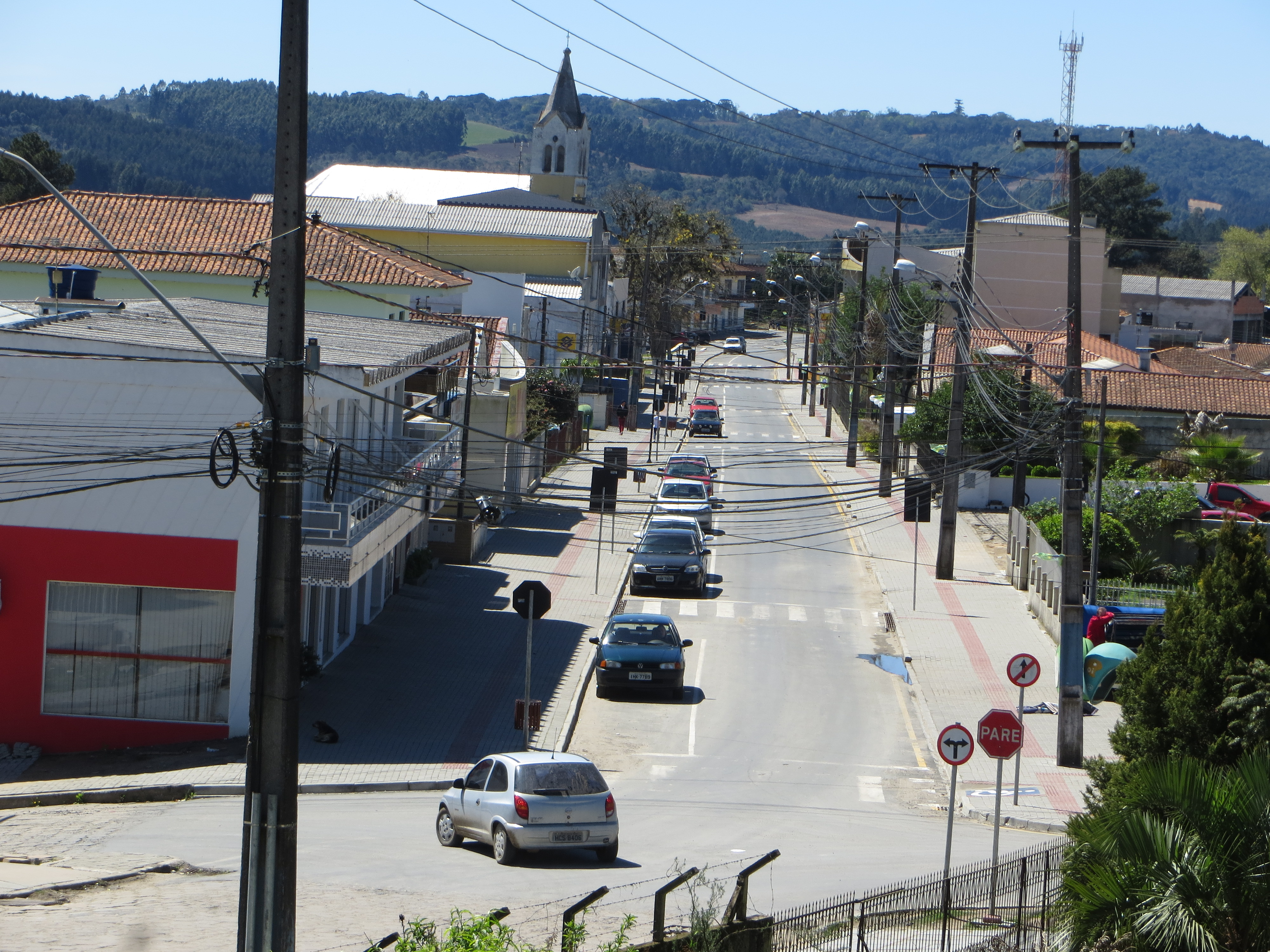
- Partial view of the city.

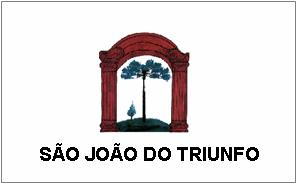
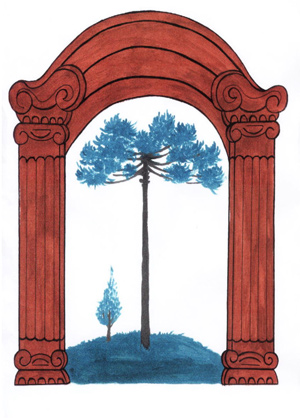
- Flag Coat of arms

- Location of São João do Triunfo in Paraná

- Location of São João do Triunfo in Brazil
- Coordinates: 25°40′58″S 50°17′49″W
- Country: Brazil
- Region: South
- State: Paraná
- Adjacent municipalities: Palmeira, Lapa, Antônio Olinto, São Mateus do Sul, Rebouças, and Fernandes Pinheiro
- Distance to capital: 106 km
- Districts: Palmira and São João do Triunfo (seat)
- Founded: January 8, 1890

Government
  - Mayor: Mário Cezar da Silva (PT)
  - Term ends: 2028

Area
  - Total: 720.407 km^{2} (278.151 sq mi)
- Elevation: 840 m (2,760 ft)

Population
  - Total: 14,996
  - Density: 20.816/km^{2} (53.913/sq mi)
- Demonym: Triunfense
- Time zone: UTC−3 (BRT)
- Climate: Humid subtropical (Cfa)
- HDI (UNDP/2010): 0.629
- HDI rank: PR: 383rd
- GDP (IBGE/2016): R$456,012.56
- GDP per capita (IBGE/2016): R$30,780.46

São João do Triunfo is a Brazilian municipality located in the interior of the state of Paraná. Situated in southeastern Paraná, it is 106 km southwest of the state capital, Curitiba. The municipality covers an area of 720.407 km², of which 0.3682 km² is within the urban area. According to the 2010 census conducted by the IBGE, its population was 13,704 inhabitants.

The municipality has an average annual temperature of 17.4 °C. Its predominant vegetation is the mixed ombrophilous forest. In 2009, 29.54% of its inhabitants lived in the urban area, and the municipality had eleven healthcare facilities. Its Human Development Index (HDI) is 0.679, which is considered to be medium for the state.

The first expedition to the region where São João do Triunfo is located occurred in 1845, when pioneers and their families sought land to settle. In 1864, the allocation of areas for the delimitation of the Rio da Vargem Parish began. Predominantly an agricultural municipality, its most significant products are tobacco, yerba mate, maize, and beans, with additional cultivation of soybeans, wheat, and potatoes. The municipality has one administrative district, Palmira. Established by State Law No. 13 on January 8, 1890, and implemented on February 15 of the same year, it was emancipated from Palmeira.

== Etymology ==
The name honors the patron saint Saint John the Baptist and João Nunes de Souza, the founder of the locality. The adjective do Triunfo was added due to the success achieved by the brave explorers of the Rio da Vargem region. The name João comes from the Hebrew name Yohanan, which means "God's grace." Saint John the Baptist announced the arrival of the Messiah.

== History ==
=== Origins and settlement ===
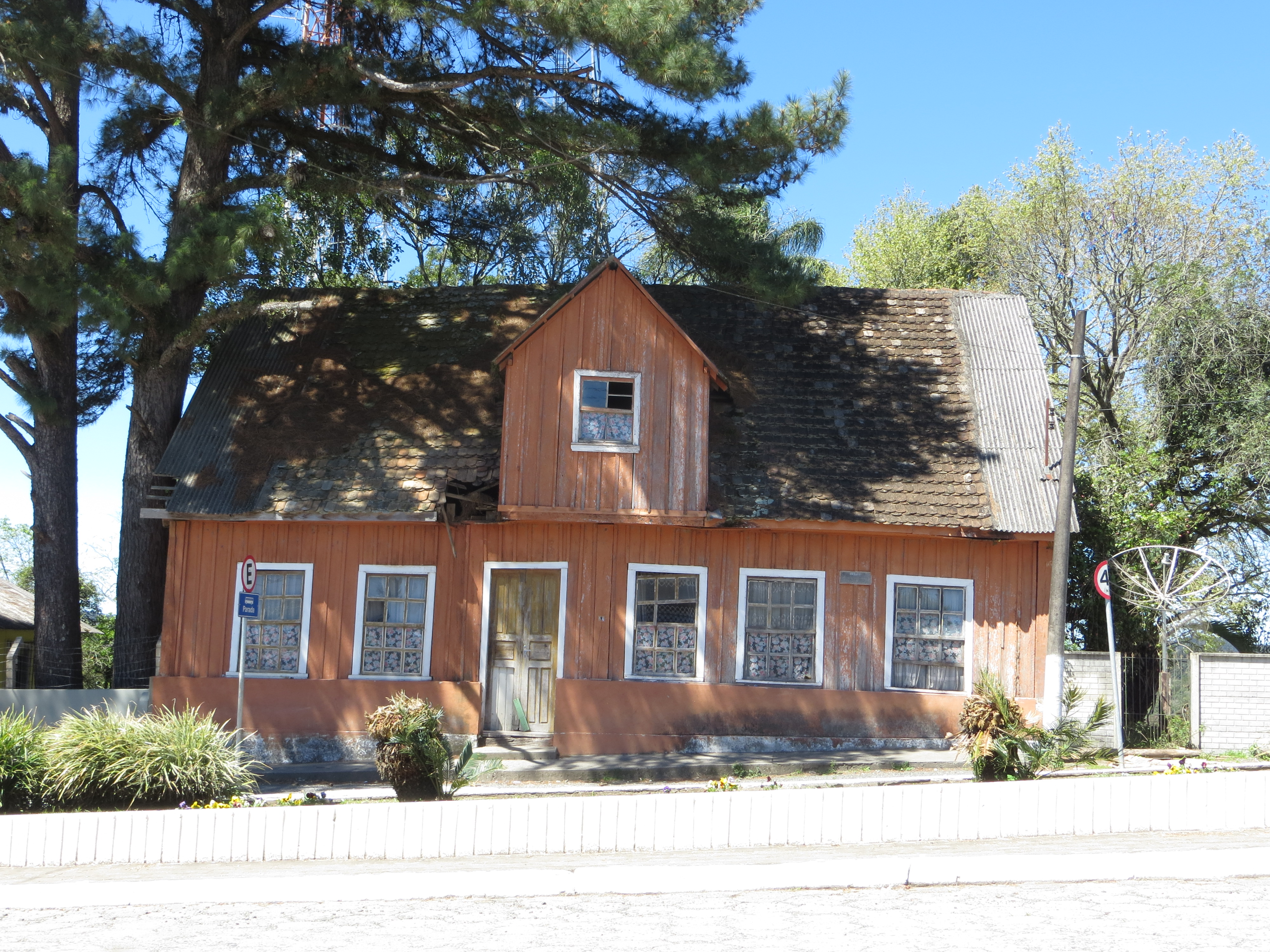
Historical mansion from the late 19th century.

The region of São João do Triunfo began to be settled in 1864. It all began when João Nunes de Souza, who lived in São José dos Pinhais, planned to go hunting in the hinterlands. An avid hunter, João de Souza set out from his homeland, traveled along the Iguazu River, and climbed along the banks of the Rio da Vargem to a certain point.

There was an abundance of wild game, lush forests, abundant waters, and fertile soil, which captivated the explorer, who decided to settle there. His entire family accompanied him, facing all the dangers inherent in such an endeavor, but they survived. They explored the region, began farming, built trails in the forest, and promoted the area as much as possible.

In 1867, Antonio Dotes arrived at Rio da Vargem (the former name of the area) with other people, and together they built a small village.

Deeply religious, the local population erected a chapel, where the image of Saint John the Baptist was enshrined. Several residences were built around the small church, primarily on land donated by the community’s founder. It was not long before the village’s name changed from Rio da Vargem to São João do Triunfo.

=== Administrative formation ===
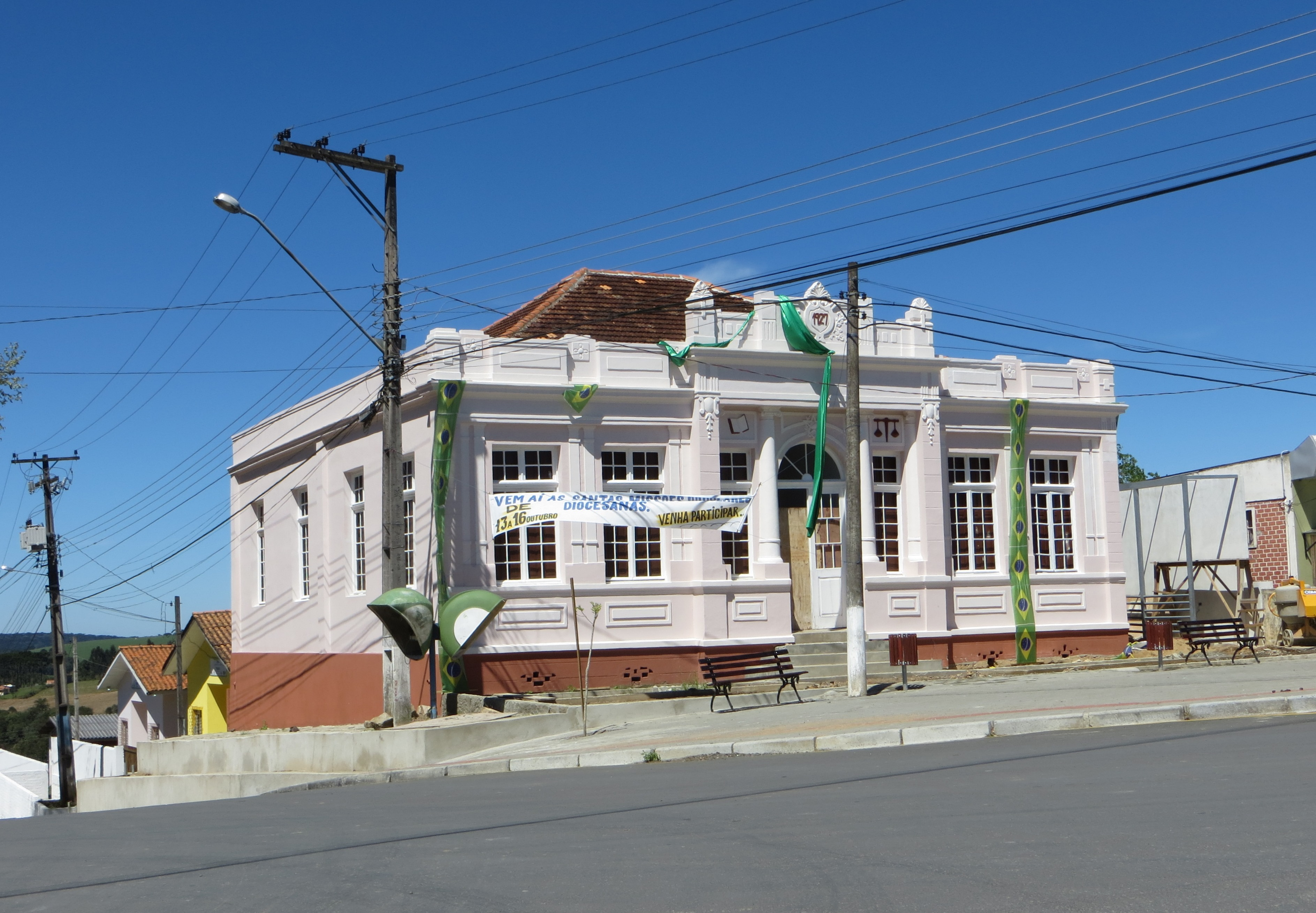
Former City Hall, built in 1927.

With the new name, on March 16, 1871, through Paraná Provincial Law No. 254, São João do Triunfo was elevated to the status of freguesia. Through Paraná State Law No. 13, dated January 8, 1890, during the Old Republic, the municipality of São João do Triunfo was established, with territory emancipated from Palmeira. It was officially implemented on February 15, 1890, with the inauguration of the mayor and councilors.

The territory of São João do Triunfo includes the district of Palmira, which welcomed Polish immigrants in the early 20th century through the Rio dos Patos and Brumado colonies. Palmira became a municipality on April 10, 1909, through State Law No. 874, and in 1920, it had a population of 2,423 inhabitants. Later, the municipality of Palmira was dissolved and incorporated into São João do Triunfo.

Through Paraná State Law No. 93, dated September 14, 1948, the municipality was elevated to the status of seat of the judicial district, with its implementation on January 25, 1949.

== Geography ==
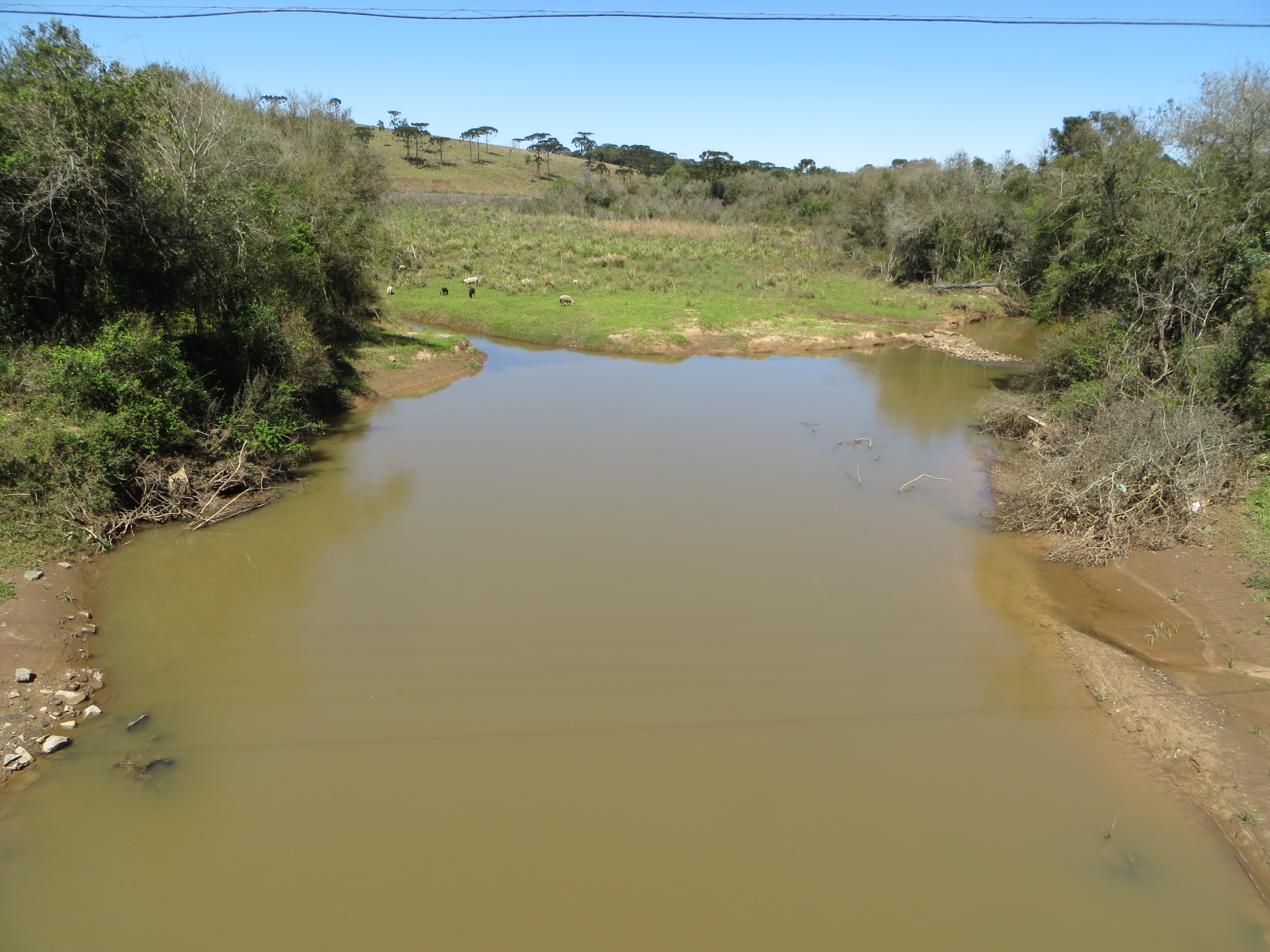
The Rio da Vargem, a tributary of the Iguazu River, runs through the municipality from north to south.

According to the Brazilian Institute of Geography and Statistics, the municipality’s area is 720.407 km², of which 0.3682 km² constitutes the urban area. It is located at 25°40′58″ south latitude and 50°17′49″ west longitude, and it is 106 kilometers southwest of the state capital. Its neighboring municipalities are: Palmeira (N); São Mateus do Sul and Antônio Olinto (S); Lapa (E); and Rebouças and Fernandes Pinheiro (W).

According to the regional division in effect since 2017, established by the IBGE, the municipality belongs to the Intermediate and Immediate Geographical Regions of Ponta Grossa. Previously, under the division into microregions and mesoregions, it was part of the São Mateus do Sul microregion, which was included in the Southeastern Paraná mesoregion.

The municipality of São João do Triunfo is part of the Second Paraná Plateau, also known as the Ponta Grossa Plateau, where the terrain is undulating, and the average altitude ranges from 1,200 to 300 meters above sea level. The average altitude of the municipal seat is 840 meters, one of the highest in the state, and the predominant geological age of the soil belongs to the Permian period.

The predominant vegetation is the Atlantic Forest, with remaining Atlantic forest reserves covering 13,288 hectares in 2011, or 18.4% of the total municipal area. The main waterway that runs through the municipal territory is the Rio da Vargem.

The climate of São João do Triunfo is classified, according to the IBGE, as oceanic (type Cfb according to the Köppen classification). January, the warmest month, has an average temperature of 21.5 °C, with a maximum of 27.3 °C and a minimum of 15.8 °C. July, the coldest month, has an average temperature of 12.8 °C, with a maximum of 19.2 °C and a minimum of 6.5 °C. Autumn and spring are transitional seasons.

The average annual precipitation is 1,451.0 mm, with July being the driest month, receiving 72.0 mm. February, the wettest month, averages 185.0 mm. In recent years, however, hot and dry days have become increasingly frequent during winter, often exceeding 30 °C, especially between July and September. Frosts are common in winter, and between July 22 and 23, 2013, freezing rain was recorded in the city.

Climate data for São João do Triunfo
Month	Jan	Feb	Mar	Apr	May	Jun	Jul	Aug	Sep	Oct	Nov	Dec	Year
Mean daily maximum °C (°F)	27.3 (81.1)	27.0 (80.6)	25.8 (78.4)	23.2 (73.8)	20.3 (68.5)	18.9 (66.0)	19.2 (66.6)	21.1 (70.0)	21.9 (71.4)	23.5 (74.3)	25.5 (77.9)	26.8 (80.2)	21.5 (70.7)
Mean daily minimum °C (°F)	15.8 (60.4)	16.0 (60.8)	14.6 (58.3)	11.8 (53.2)	8.5 (47.3)	7.1 (44.8)	6.5 (43.7)	7.7 (45.9)	10.0 (50.0)	11.8 (53.2)	13.1 (55.6)	14.6 (58.3)	12.8 (55.0)
Average precipitation mm (inches)	164.0 (6.46)	185.0 (7.28)	120.0 (4.72)	96.0 (3.78)	85.0 (3.35)	123.0 (4.84)	72.0 (2.83)	84.0 (3.31)	125.0 (4.92)	146.0 (5.75)	105.0 (4.13)	146.0 (5.75)	1,451 (57.13)
Source: Climate-Data.org

== Demographics ==
Historical population
Year	Pop.	±%
1970	10,296	—
1980	10,803	+4.9%
1991	12,320	+14.0%
2000	12,479	+1.3%
2010	13,704	+9.8%
Source: IBGE

In 2010, the municipality’s population was counted by the Brazilian Institute of Geography and Statistics (IBGE) at 13,704 inhabitants. According to the census of that year, 7,208 inhabitants were men and 6,496 were women. According to the same census, 4,048 residents lived in the urban area and 6,496 in the rural area. Of the total population that year, 1,215 inhabitants (8.86%) were under 15 years old, 2,894 residents (20.11%) were between 15 and 64 years old, and 344 people (2.5%) were over 65, with a life expectancy at birth of 73.1 years and a fertility rate of 2.1 children per woman.

In 2010, the population consisted of 10,790 whites (78.74%), 244 blacks (1.78%), 69 Asians (0.50%), 2,597 pardos (18.95%), and 4 indigenous people (0.03%). Regarding the region of birth, 16 were born in the Southeast (0.12%), 6 in the North (0.04%), 5 in the Northeast (0.04%), and 13,620 in the South (99.39%). 13,438 inhabitants were natives of Paraná (98.06%), and of these, 11,877 were born in São João do Triunfo (86.67%). Among the 266 natives of other states, Santa Catarina had the highest representation with 112 people (0.82%), followed by Rio Grande do Sul with 70 residents (0.51%), and Minas Gerais with 11 residents (0.08%).

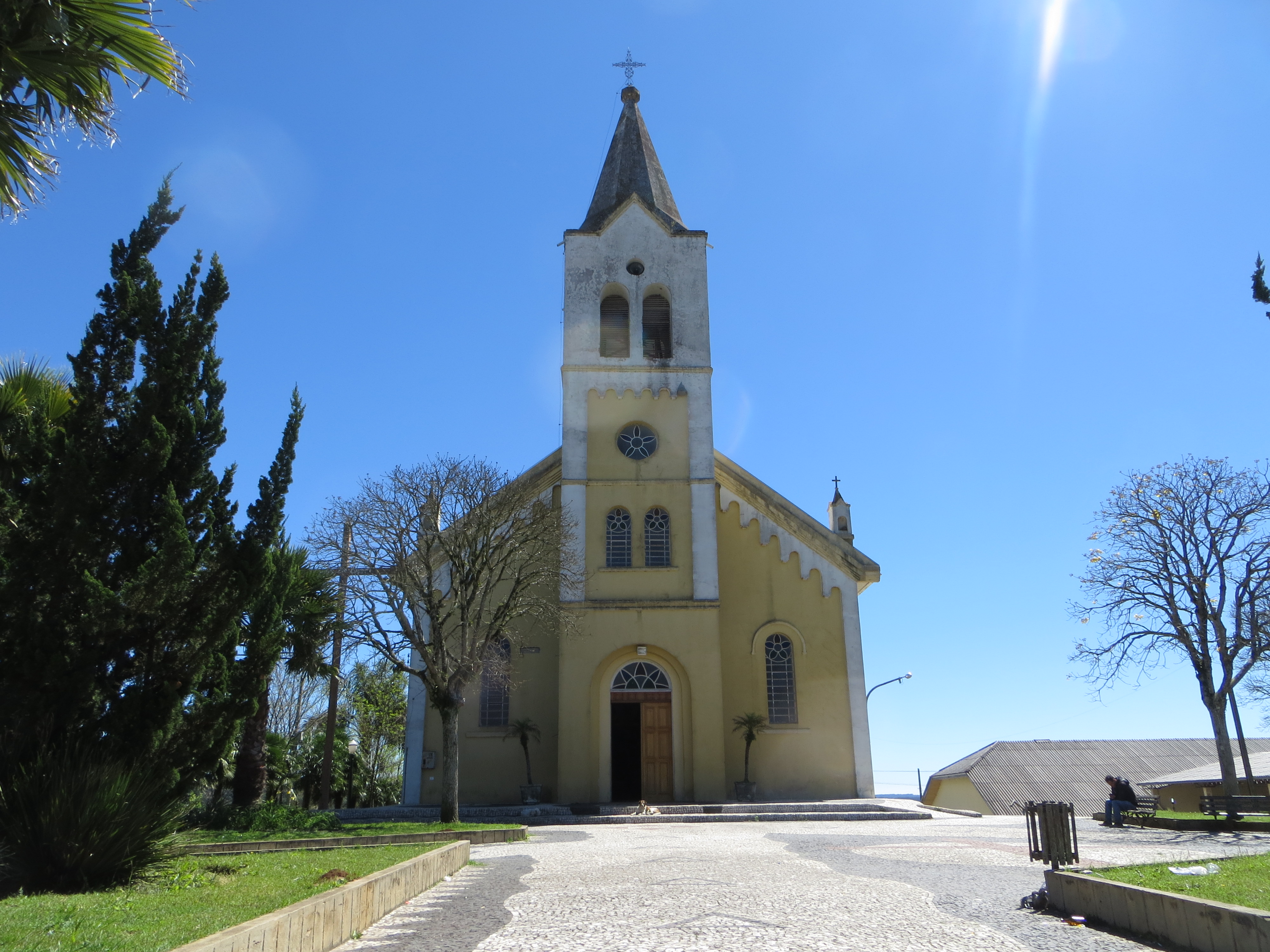
Saint John the Baptist Parish, located in the main church square

The Human Development Index (HDI) of São João do Triunfo is considered medium by the UNDP, with a value of 0.629 (the 3501st highest in Brazil and the 15th lowest in Paraná). Considering only the education index, the value is 0.475, the longevity index is 0.801, and the income index is 0.655. From 2000 to 2010, the proportion of people with a per capita household income of up to half a minimum wage decreased by 20.5%, and in 2010, 79.5% of the population lived above the poverty line, 11.7% were at the poverty line, and 8.8% were below it. The Gini coefficient was 0.500, with 0.41 being the worst and 0.36 the best. The share of the richest 20% of the population in the total municipal income was 52.6%, which is 15.3 times higher than that of the poorest 20%, which was 3.4%.

According to data from the 2010 census conducted by the IBGE, the municipal population consisted of: 11,917 Catholics (86.96%), 1,473 evangelicals (10.75%), and 198 people with no religion (1.44%). According to the Catholic Church division, the city is home to the Saint John the Baptist Parish, under the Diocese of União da Vitória.

== Politics and administration ==
The municipal administration is carried out by the executive and legislative powers. The representative of the executive power of São João do Triunfo, elected in the 2024 municipal elections, was Mário Cezar da Silva of the Workers' Party, who won a total of 5,621 votes (60.63% of the voters), with Cristian Borges as vice-mayor.

The legislative power, in turn, is constituted by the municipal chamber, composed of 9 councilors elected for four-year terms (in accordance with Article 29 of the Constitution) and consists of two seats for the Republicans, two for the Progressistas, two for the Green Party, one seat for the Workers' Party, one for the Social Democratic Party, one for Solidarity, and one for the Liberal Party. It is responsible for drafting and voting on fundamental laws for the administration and the executive, especially the participatory budget (Budget Guidelines Law).

There were 11,082 voters in April 2016, representing 0.142% of the state’s total. The municipality of São João do Triunfo is governed by an organic law and is the only municipality under the jurisdiction of the homonymous judicial district, of which it is the seat. It is subdivided into two districts, namely the seat and Palmira.

Politics of São João do Triunfo

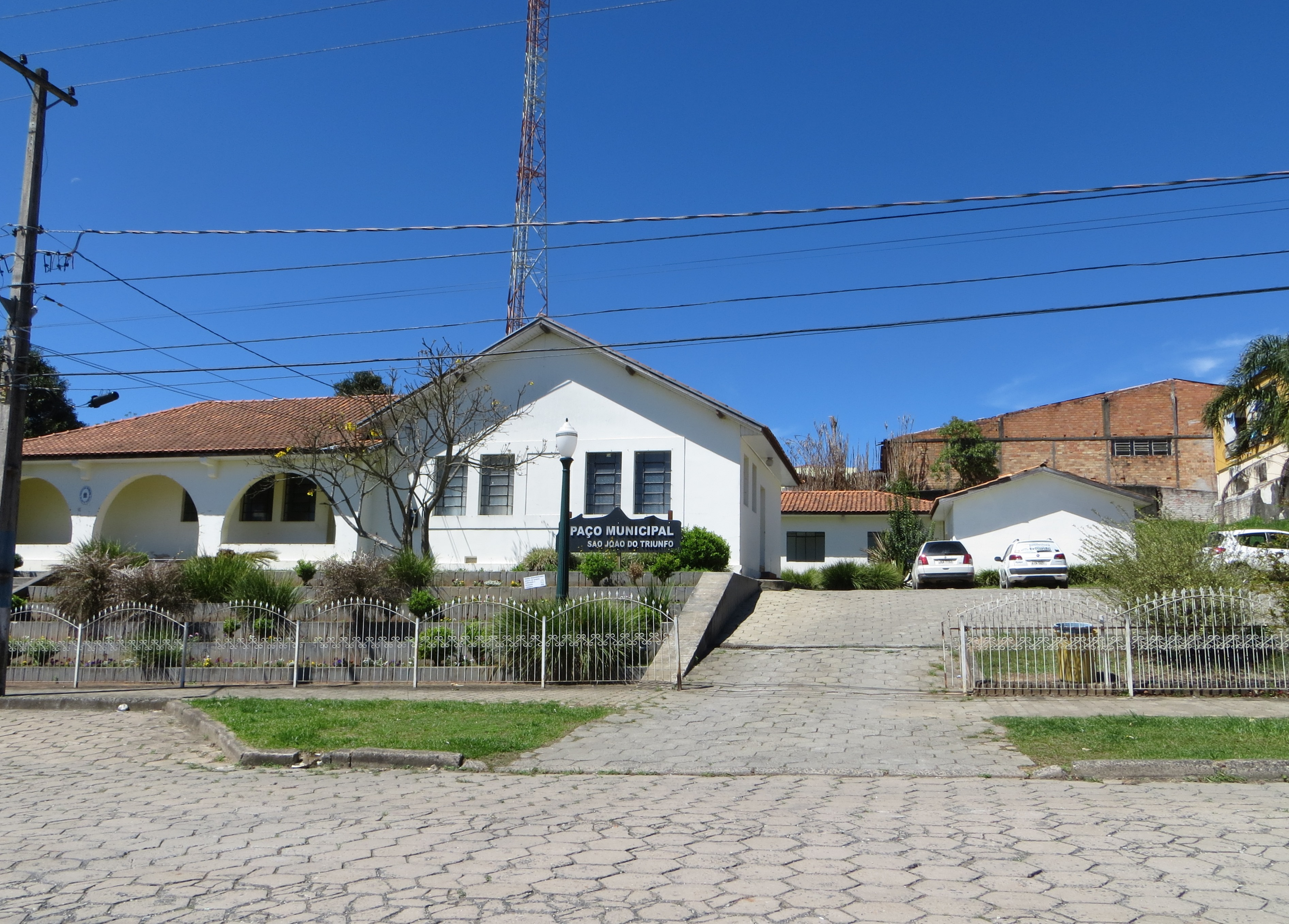
City Hall, seat of the municipal executive power.

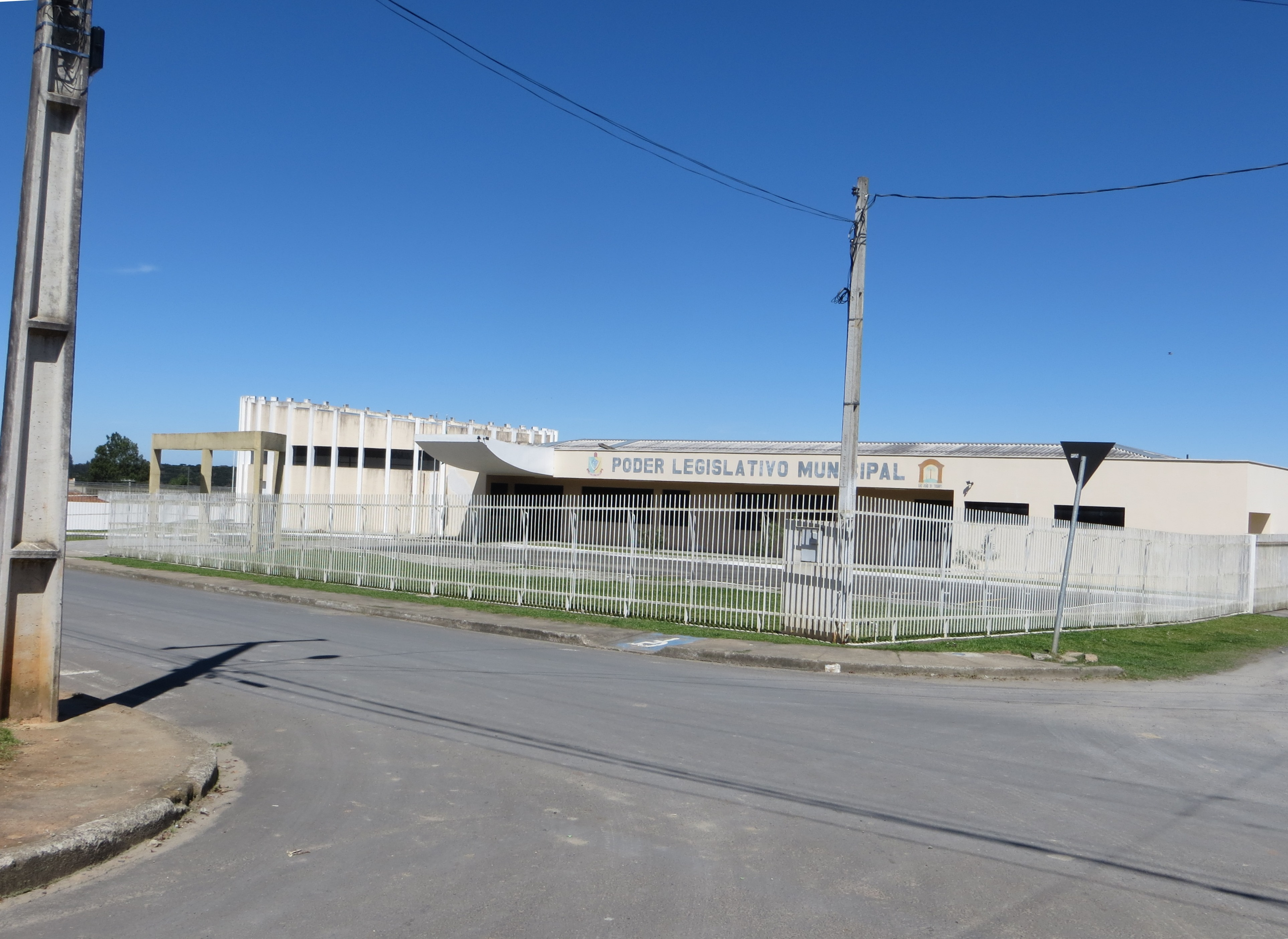
City Council, seat of the municipal legislative power.

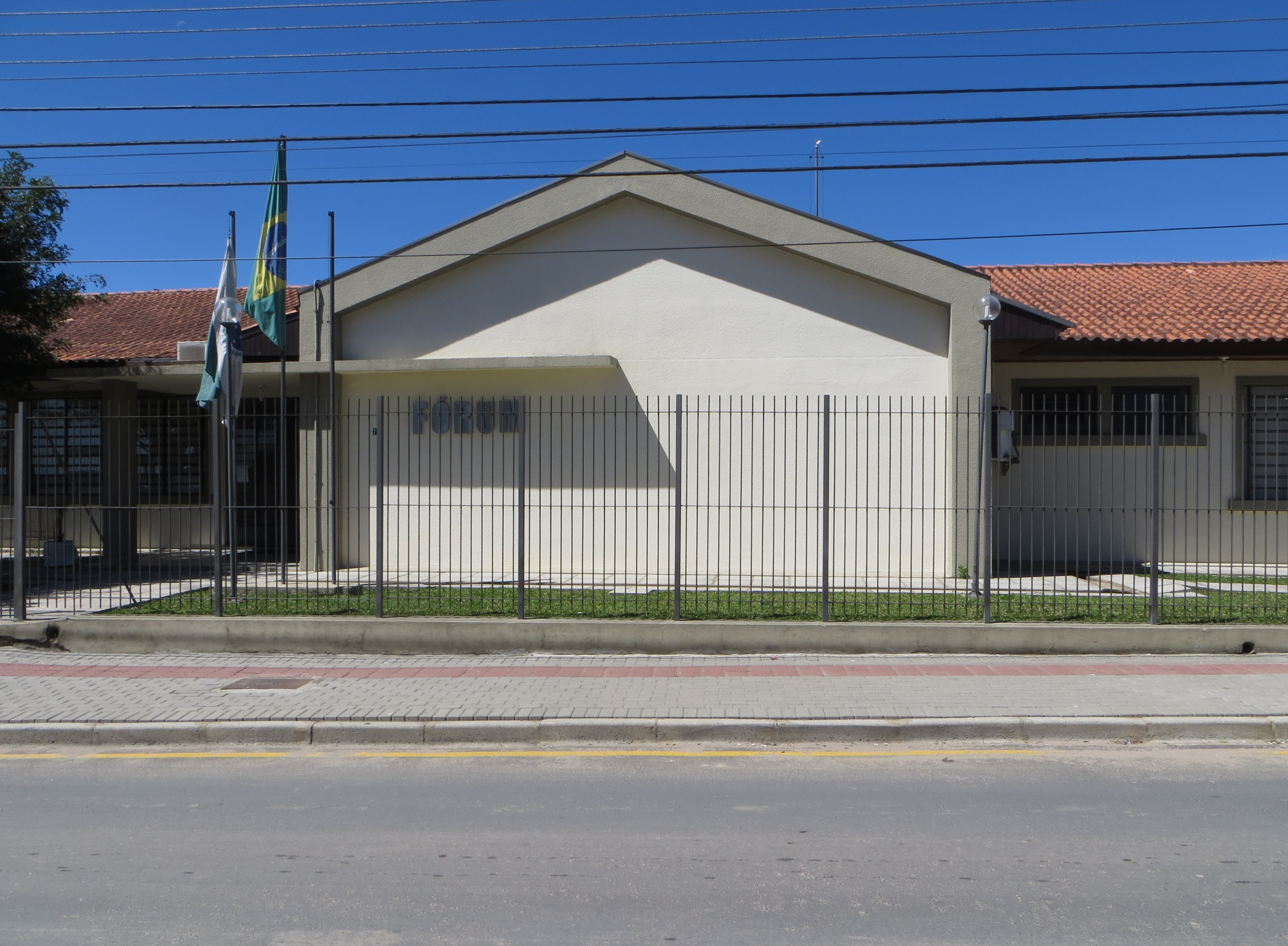
Forum of the Judicial District, seat of the municipal judicial power.

== Subdivisions ==
When it was emancipated in 1890, São João do Triunfo was made up of several villages. The first to separate and later become a municipality was São Mateus do Sul. Other cities, such as Porto Amazonas, were also part of the territory. After São João do Triunfo became a municipality, Rio Azul and Rebouças also separated. On April 10, 1909, the district of Palmira was created, and in the territorial division of July 1, 1960, which is still in effect, São João do Triunfo consists of two districts: the seat and Palmira.

The urban area of the municipality consists only of the Centro, with no other neighborhoods. The rural area is divided into several farms, villages, and communities, listed as follows: Avencal, Santana, Faxinal dos Fabrícios, Faxinal Cachoeira, Mangueirinha, Bituva dos Machados, Cachoeira, Vitorinópolis, Rio Baio Terceiro, Pinhalzinho, Papuã, Faxinal do Louro, Serrinha, Morro Grande, Boa Vista, Bolo Grande, Taquaruçu, Solidão, Lajinha, Guaiaca, Colônia Bromado, Coxilhão de Santa Rosa, Coxilhão do Meio, Coxilhão das Ameixeiras, Faxinal dos Pereiras, Faxinal dos Rodrigues, Ponte Nova, Mato Queimado, Floresta São Paulo, Porto Feliz, Meia Lua, Barra Bonita, Água Branca, Poços, Salto, Monte Alegre, Fundão, Rodeio, Ladeira, Jacu, and Colônia Lagoa.

== Economy ==
In the Gross Domestic Product (GDP) of São João do Triunfo, the agriculture and service sectors stand out. According to 2016 IBGE data, the municipality’s GDP was R$456,012.56. R$13,107.66 were from taxes on products net of subsidies at current prices, and the per capita GDP was R$30,780.46. In 2010, 70.72% of the population over 18 years old was economically active, while the unemployment rate was 2.61%.

Wages, including other remunerations, totaled R$13,095, and the average monthly salary in the municipality was 2.0 minimum wages. There were 209 local units and 206 active companies. According to the IBGE, 16.31% of households survived on less than one minimum wage per month per resident (667 households), 18.9% lived on between one and three minimum wages per person (767), 1.71% received between three and five (70), 0.83% had income above five per month (34), and 2.74% had no income (112).

Primary sector

Production of tobacco, soybeans, and maize (2014)
Product	Harvested area (hectares)	Production (tonnes)
Tobacco	7,200	18,000
Soybeans	5,500	15,950
Maize	1,200	9,000

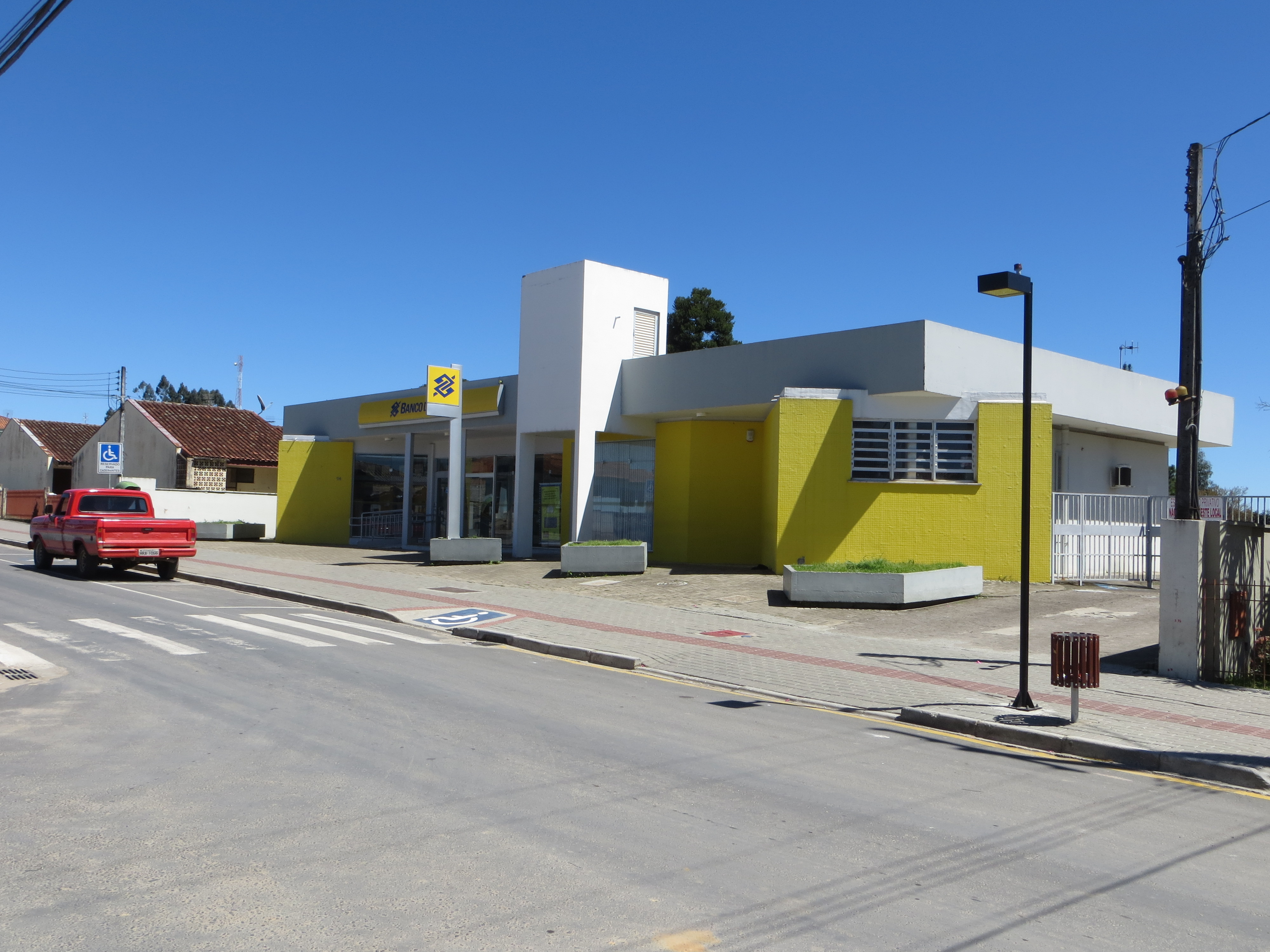
Bank of Brazil Agency.

In 2016, of the total GDP of the city, R$287,390.52 was the gross added value of agriculture, while in 2010, 70.72% of the municipality’s economically active population was employed in the sector. According to the IBGE, in 2013, the municipality had 4,286 cattle, 398 buffalo, 180 goats, 2,800 horses, 650 sheep, 11,000 chickens, and 21,000 poultry. Six hundred and ten cows were milked, producing 310 thousand liters of milk. Additionally, 21,000 kilograms of honey were produced.

In terms of temporary crops, the main products are tobacco (18,000 tonnes produced and 7,200 hectares cultivated), soybeans (15,950 tonnes produced and 5,500 hectares planted), and maize (9,000 tonnes produced and 2,600 hectares cultivated), in addition to garlic, rice, oats, potatoes, onions, rye, beans, cassava, wheat, and triticale. In terms of permanent crops, yerba mate (900 tonnes produced and 330 hectares harvested) and grapes (126 tonnes produced and 14 hectares harvested) stand out.

Secondary and tertiary sectors

Industrial production contributed R$19,851.32 to the municipality’s GDP in 2016, mainly from the manufacturing industry, with a small-scale presence of non-metallic mineral products, wood, furniture, chemical, and food industries. According to the IBGE, in 2014, 7,500 m³ of timber was extracted for firewood and, according to 2010 statistics, 2.89% of São João do Triunfo’s workers were employed in the manufacturing industry.

In 2010, 3.18% of the employed population worked in construction, 0.29% in public utilities, 7.63% in commerce, and 16.52% in services. In 2016, R$75,748.97 of the municipal GDP came from the gross added value of the service sector, and R$59,914.09 from public administration.

== Infrastructure ==
=== Housing, public safety, services, and communications ===
In 2010, São João do Triunfo had 4,090 households, of which 4,067 were houses and 23 were apartments. Of the total households, 3,585 were owned, with 3,546 fully paid and 39 under acquisition, 200 were rented; 295 properties were provided, with 152 by employers and 143 in other ways; and 10 were occupied in other forms. The electricity supply service is provided by COPEL, and in 2010, according to the IBGE, 4,001 households had access to the network.

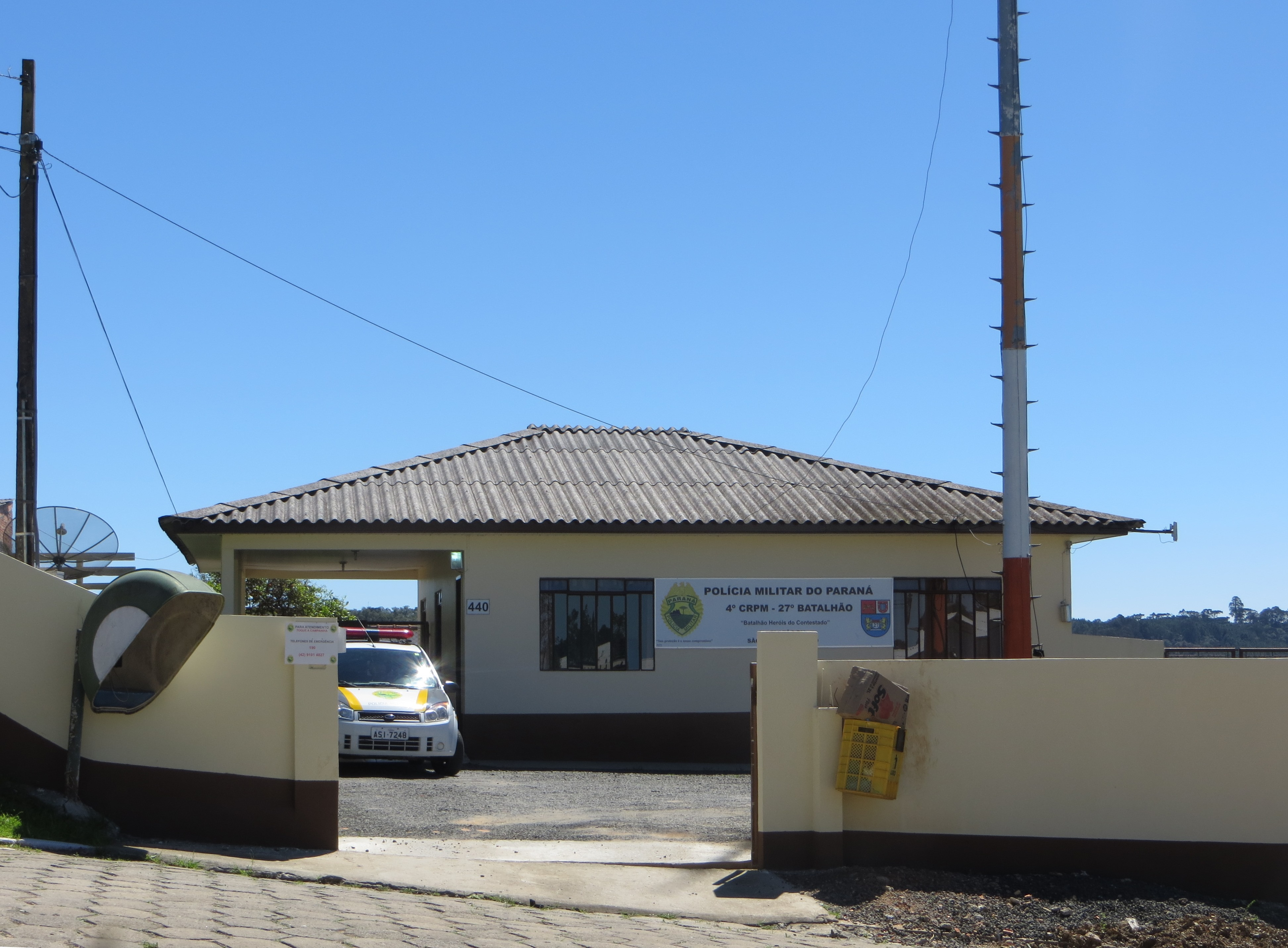
Military Police of Paraná State Detachment.

In 2011, a rate of 3 homicides per 100,000 inhabitants was recorded, the 195th highest in the state and the 2620th in Brazil. The rate of traffic accidents in the same year was two incidents per 100,000 residents. Regarding suicides, the rate was 2.3 incidents per 100,000 inhabitants, the 162nd highest in the state and the 2074th in Brazil. By force of the Brazilian Federal Constitution, São João do Triunfo also has a Municipal Guard, responsible for protecting municipal assets, services, and facilities. The 2nd Platoon of the PMPR in São João do Triunfo is the headquarters of the municipality’s military police, under the jurisdiction of the 27th BPM, based in União da Vitória, of the 4th CRPM in Ponta Grossa.

The water supply and sewage collection services are provided by Sanepar, and in 2008, there were 2,149 consumer units, with an average of 746 m³ of treated water distributed per day. According to the IBGE, in 2010, 2,214 households were served by the general water supply network, and 3,313 had bathrooms for exclusive household use. The area code (DDD) of São João do Triunfo is 042, and the postal code CEP ranges from 84150–000 to 84150–000.

=== Healthcare, education, and transportation ===
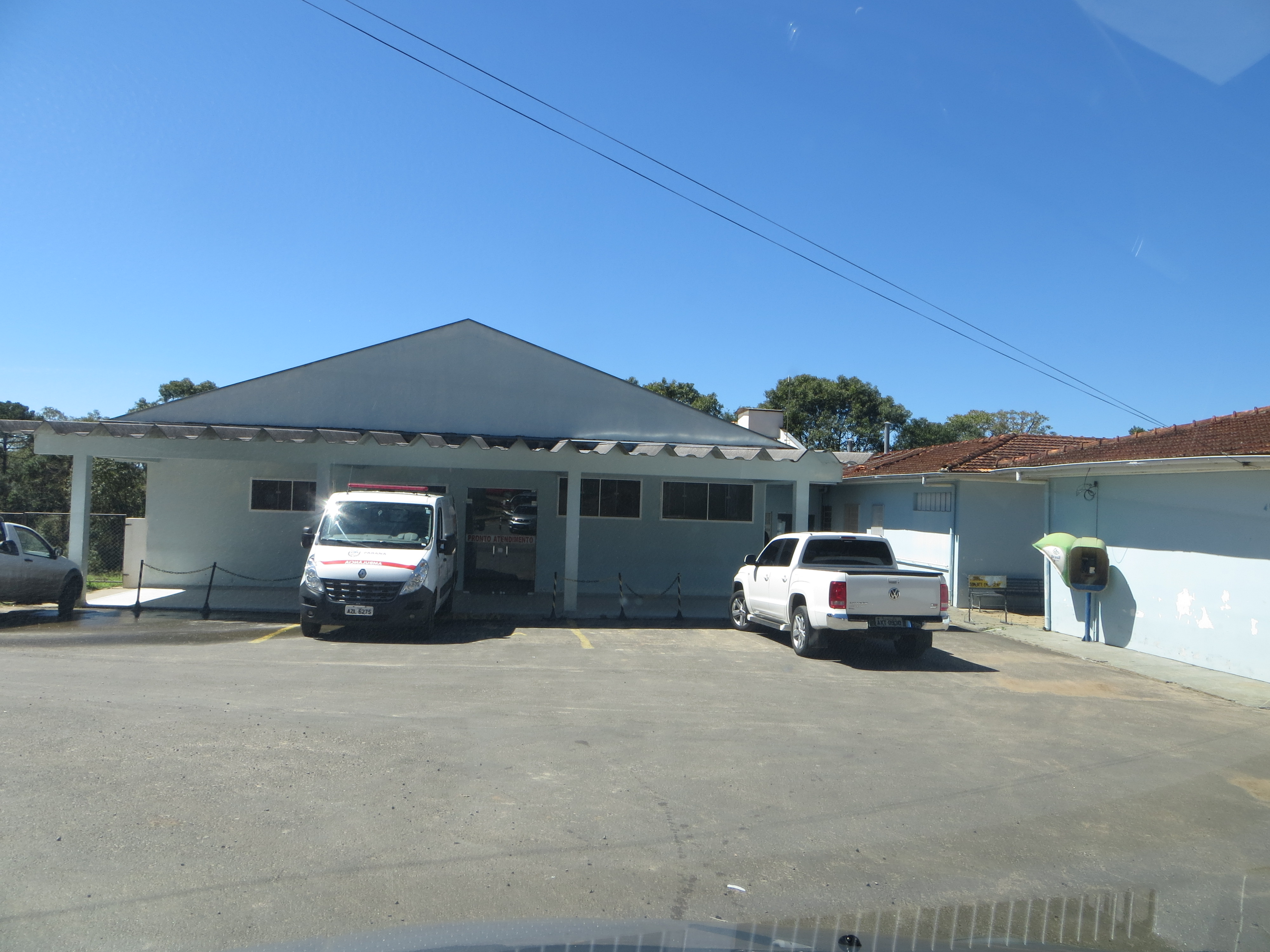
Immaculate Conception Hospital and Maternity.

In 2009, the municipality had eleven healthcare facilities, one private and ten public municipal facilities, including hospitals, emergency rooms, health centers, and dental services. There were 26 hospital beds available. In 2014, 99% of children under 1 year old were up to date with their vaccinations. In 2013, there were 159 live births, with no infant mortality of children under five years old per thousand. In 2010, 4.31% of women aged 10 to 17 had children, with 12.22% of them aged 10 to 14, and the activity rate in this age group was 12.22%. 83.0% of children under 2 years old were weighed by the Family Health Program in 2013, with 1.2% of them malnourished.

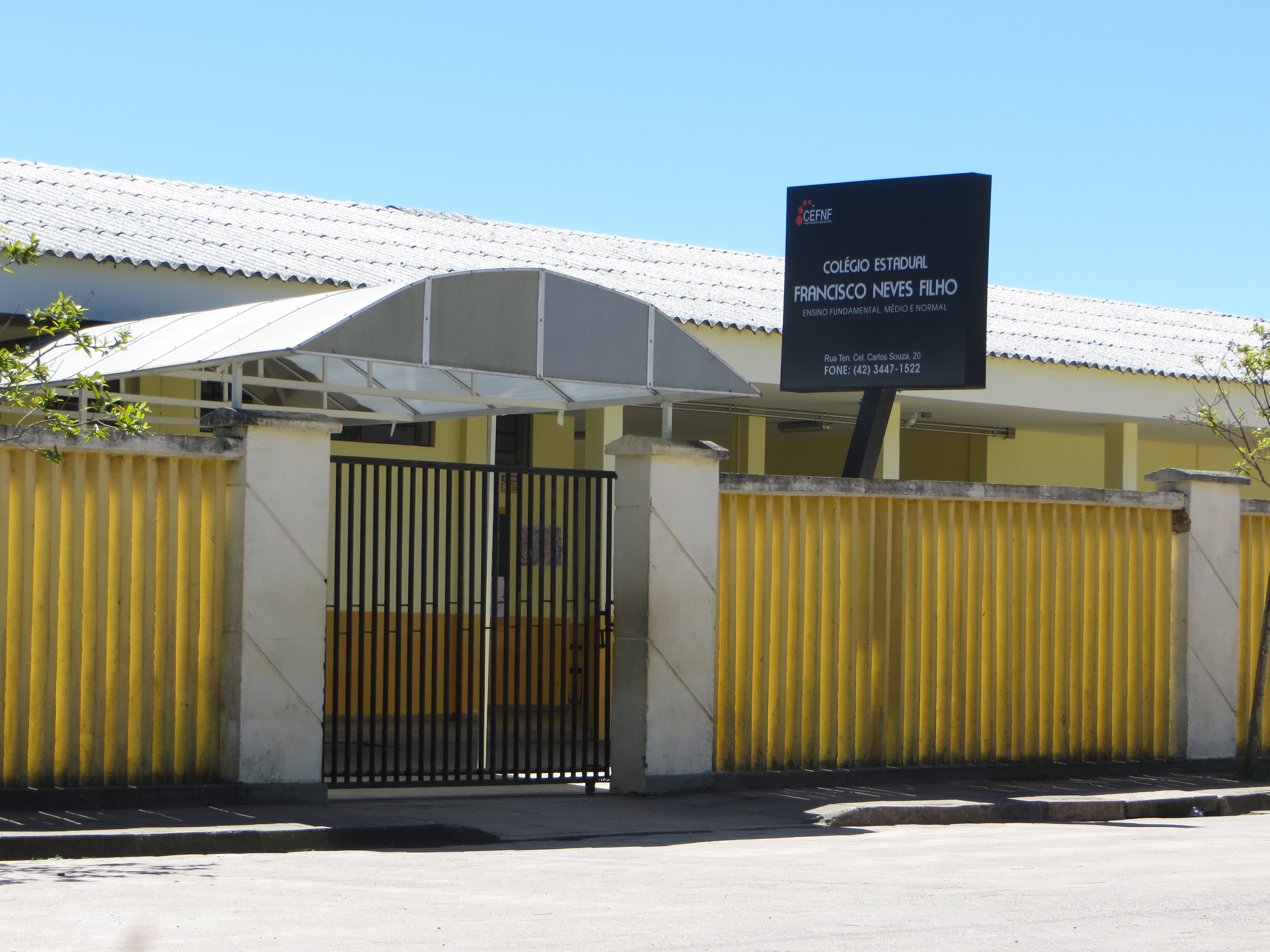
Francisco Neves Filho State School.

In the field of education, the average IDEB score among public schools in 2013 was 4.4 (on a scale from 1 to 10), with 5th-grade students scoring 5.3 and 9th-grade students scoring 4.4; the national average was 4.0. In 2010, 85.08% of children aged seven to fourteen were not attending elementary school. The completion rate for young people aged 15 to 17 was 43.82%, and the literacy rate for youths and adolescents aged 18 to 24 was 26.40%. The age-grade distortion among elementary school students, i.e., those older than the recommended age, was 10.1% for the initial years and 33.2% for the final years, and in high school, the distortion reached 32.1%. Among residents aged 18 or older, 29.14% had completed elementary education, 26.40% had completed high school, and the population had an average of 9.88 expected years of study.

In 2010, according to census sample data, 3,704 inhabitants attended daycares and/or schools. Of this total, 44 attended daycares, 283 were in preschool, 106 in literacy classes, 27 in youth and adult education, 2,395 in elementary school, 488 in high school, 93 in elementary adult education, 75 in high school adult education, 25 in higher education specialization, and 169 in undergraduate courses. 8,934 people did not attend educational institutions, with 1,446 never having attended and 8,554 having attended at some point.

The municipality is served by the PR-151 highway, as well as the BR-277, which starts in Curitiba and passes through Campo Largo, Balsa Nova, São Luiz do Purunã, Colônia Witmarsum, Porto Amazonas, and Palmeira (along BR-277), before turning left onto PR-151.

== Culture ==
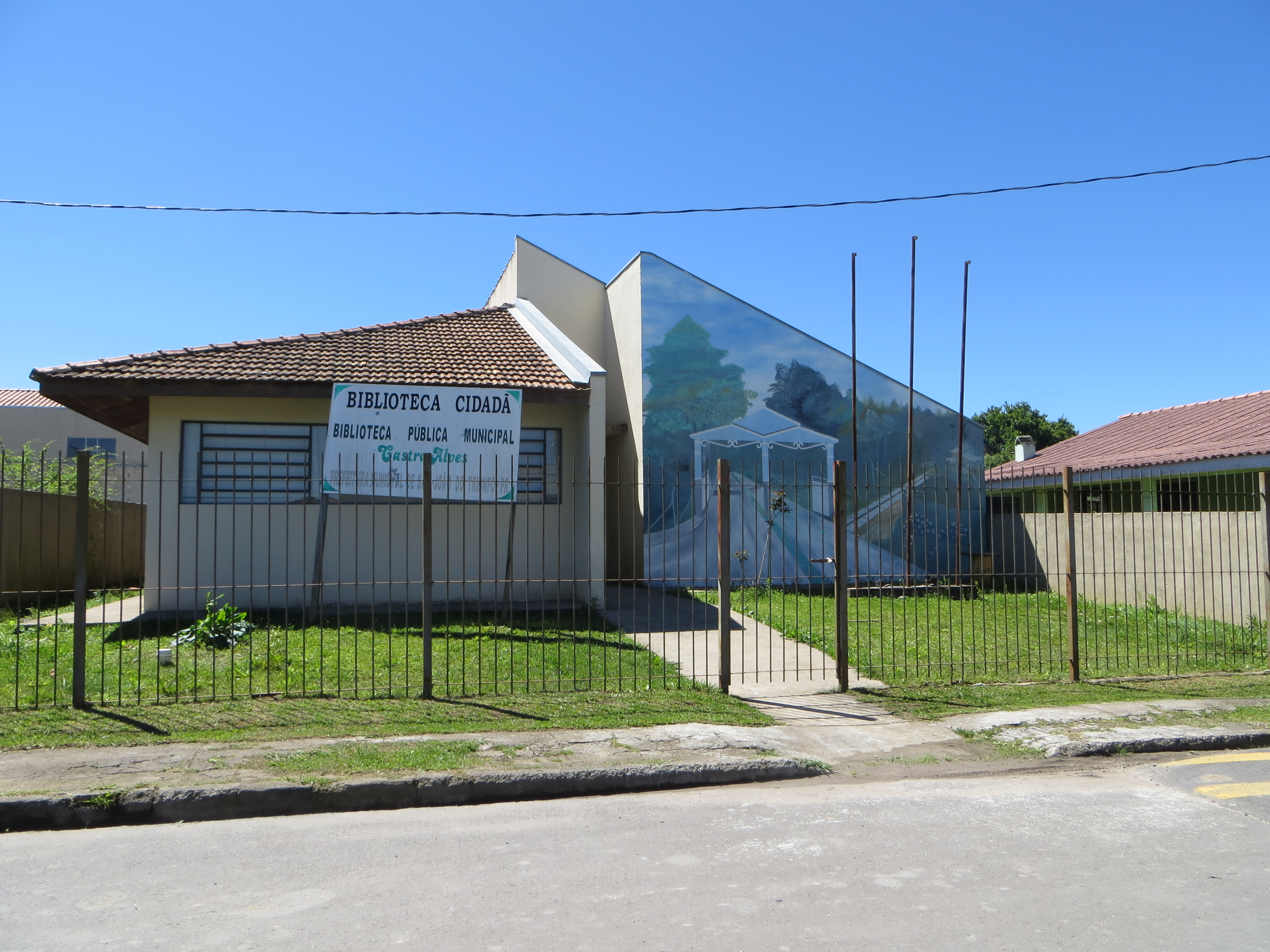
Professora Lina dos Santos Oliveira Public Library

To promote local socioeconomic development, the municipal government of São João do Triunfo, in collaboration with local and external institutions, has increased investments in festivals and events. The Department of Education, Culture, and Tourism is the municipal government body responsible for overseeing the cultural sector, with mandatory representation from various fields.

The only cultural venue in the municipality is the Professora Lina dos Santos Oliveira Public Library. The sole tourist attraction, the Arco Íris Waterfall, is located in the Coxilhão Santa Rosa community, near the Telepar tower, past the city of Palmeira. It is owned by Paulo Domingos Bedim and is open to visitors.

=== Holidays ===
São João do Triunfo observes two municipal holidays, eight national holidays, and several optional holidays. The municipal holidays are the feast day of John the Baptist, celebrated on June 24, and the city’s political emancipation day, celebrated on February 15. According to Brazil’s Federal Law No. 9,093, enacted on September 12, 1995, municipalities may designate up to four religious municipal holidays, including Good Friday.

=== Festivals ===
In São João do Triunfo, families from the communities of Pinhalzinho, Canudos, Cachoeira, Fabrícios, and Rio Baio organize the São Gonçalo Dance. During the festival, participants perform the dance in front of an altar adorned with various images, including that of São Gonçalo.

=== Cuisine ===
The traditional dish of São João do Triunfo is polenta with free-range chicken.

== See also ==
- List of municipalities in Paraná

== Bibliography ==
- Ferreira, João Carlos Vicente (1996). O Paraná e seus municípios. Maringá: Editora Memória Brasileira. p. 728.
