= Cecília Colony =

Anarchist commune in Brazil (1890-1893)

Cecília Colony Colônia Cecília
- Commune
- Country: Brazil
- State: Paraná
- Municipality: Palmeira
- Established: 1890
- Disbanded: 1892
- Founder: Giovanni Rossi

Government
  - Type: Anarchist commune

Population
  - Total: 250

Cecília Colony (Portuguese: Colônia Cecília) was an experimental commune based on anarchist principles. The colony was founded in 1890, in the municipality of Palmeira, in the state of Paraná, by a group of libertarians mobilized by the Italian writer and agronomist Giovanni Rossi.

The foundation of Cecília Colony was the first effective attempt to implement anarchism in Brazil. Rossi, an anarchist writer, was instigated by the Brazilian musician Carlos Gomes to seek audience with Pedro II for the purpose of establishing a libertarian community capable of propelling a "new time".

Interested in the colonization of Brazil, Pedro II met the request and wrote Rossi offering lands in the Southern Region to be occupied by Italian immigrants. But this donation, in fact, did not happen: shortly after their supply by the emperor, the Brazilian Republic was established, which did not recognize land concessions granted to foreigners by the deposed Empire. Instead, Rossi had to buy the land through the "inspector of land and colonization."

Brazil received many immigrants, mainly Italians, at the end of the nineteenth century. The living conditions in the countryside which caused emigration from Italy was not very different in Brazil, both in coffee farms and colonial nuclei, being distant from an innovative process: the immigrant was inserted into Brazil as a potential proletarian. It was in this social environment that Cecilia Colony started.

== Life in the colony ==
The first settlers arrived in 1890 and built a collective shed that families were provisionally installed into, before each one dealt with building their own home. At that time, the population contingent in Cecília Colony was almost three hundred people, including Rossi himself. At the end of 1891, the population explosion surpassed the available structure: 20 wooden houses and a community shed. The crops and livestock did not produce enough for the subsistence of settlers, a large part of whom were industrial workers without agricultural knowledge to implement a larger scale production.

The first obstacle faced by the anarchist nucleus was the way to organize the work. Tasks were designated to the artisans that were similar to those which they already practiced. But as to the farmers, Giovanni Rossi had already had sensed that they would find difficulties because of the difference between the Brazilian soil and the Italian.

In concluding the construction of collective and individual dwellings and rationally divided work among the 150 colonists, they encountered a real fact: maize, which was ideal for that region, is not born from day to night. With the money they brought, they managed to subsist, to buy groceries, instruments and seeds for the farming. However, they were forced to look for other activities for them to sustain their livelihood until they could live only from their crop. Some occupied the plantation while others worked in government works.

The settlers planted more than eighty alqueires of land - in the area provided to them by Emperor Pedro II, shortly before the proclamation of the Republic - and built more than ten kilometers of road, at a time in which there were no machines, tractors or transport cranes.

In addition to the large corn plantation, they built a collective shed, twenty individual sheds, barns, a cornflour mill, a fish tank, the collective pavilion - which also housed the doctor's office - a nursery of seedlings, wells, ditches, a pear orchard and stables.

In the four years of existence of the colony (1890-1894), its population reached about 250 people. Two polyamorous relations were held. Rossi himself proposed as a concrete example of the new lifestyle, sharing with another man his love for a woman in the colony.

In 1892, the first setback occurred in the colony: seven families decided on returning to Italy - the first breakdown that, followed by others, reduced the colony to only twenty people until the end of that same year. Many settlers, which included doctors, engineers, teachers, intellectuals and workers, as well as peasants, then started to migrate to Curitiba, where they founded the Giuseppe Garibaldi Society.

The following year, the colony received the arrival of new settlers. In this period, the manufacture of shoes and wine barrels began. At the end of this year, the colony counted sixty-four people, two artesian wells and an access road. It was also during this period that the cobblers from the colony promoted a prominent role in the workers movement of Paraná.

== The end of the colony ==
The experiment of Cecília Colony ended for several reasons. The main was the material poverty, even the conditions of misery. Secondly, the hostility of the neighboring Polish community, who were strongly Catholic. The clergy itself and local authorities promoted the ostracism of anarchists. In addition, there were diseases, related to malnutrition, lack of adequate sanitation conditions, in addition to the internal problems linked to the difficulties of adaptation to the style of anarchist coexistence, particularly for free love, the practice which, although theoretically approved by all, aroused insecurity.

Cecília Colony, from the end of 1893, gave signs of exhaustion: there was great demand for labor in neighboring cities, especially Palmeira, Porto Amazonas, Ponta Grossa, beyond the capital. Even so, other families continued to settle in the colony, attracted to the propaganda widespread by the European socialist press, but these new arrivals were not enough for its maintenance. Cecilia Colony extinguished in 1893.

== Representation in popular culture ==
The stories experienced in Cecília Colony were represented in several artistic interpretations, such as in literature and the dramaturgy of Brazilian television. In literature, there was the work of Zélia Gattai, Anarquistas, Graças a Deus (1979), where it deals with stories involving a family that came to integrate the colony.

The work of Gattai inspired the Brazilian miniseries produced by Rede Globo that took the same name, Anarquistas, Graças a Deus (1984), written by Walter George Durst and directed by Walter Avancini. The Rede Bandeirantes first exhibited in 1989 the miniseries Colônia Cecilia, written by Patrícia Melo and Carlos Nascimbeni, in which the drama was carried out by Giovanni Rossi, played by Paulo Betti. In 2012, the RPC exhibited the miniseries Colônia Cecília – Uma História de Amor e Utopia, produced by GP7 Cinema.

== In cinema ==
In 1975, Jean-Louis Comolli, Editor of Chief of the French magazine Cahiers du Cinéma between 1966 and 1971, directed the film La Cecilia, a French and Italian co-production, portraying the history of the colony's founding community. The film was inserted into the 1970 political cinema files, the result of the student movements of 1968, along with other contemporary European productions, especially from Italian filmmakers such as Francesco Rosi, Elio Petri and the Taviani Brothers.

Filmed in unidentified place, probably in Italy, in Italian and Portuguese, has the actors Massimo Foschi (Giovanni Rossi), Maria Carta (Olympia), Vittorio Mezzogiorno (Luigi) and Mario Bussolino (Ernesto Lorenzini). The script is credited to Jean-Louis Comolli, Eduardo de Gregorio and Marianne di Vettimo. The original music is from the musician Michel Portal, but also includes, in the opening, the anarchist song Amore Ribelle by Pietro Gori, sung by Maria Caria.

It was released in July 1975 at Taormina Film Festival and commercially in France the following year.

== Memorial Cologne Cecilia ==
On 31 March 2016 the Cecília Colony Anarchist Memorial was inaugurated in the Memorial Square of Cecília in Brazil, in the locality of Santa Bárbara, a rural area of the municipality of Palmeira. The memorial was built with federal resources and has nine totems, a replica of immigrant homes and a bust of Giovanni Rossi. The space where the memorial was built was a donation from one of the descendants of Italian immigrants who resided in the locality, Evaldo Agottani.

The memorial was constructed by the architect Murilo Malucelli Klas and the eight mosaic totems were created by the plastic artist Marcos Coga.

Memorial da Colônia Cecília

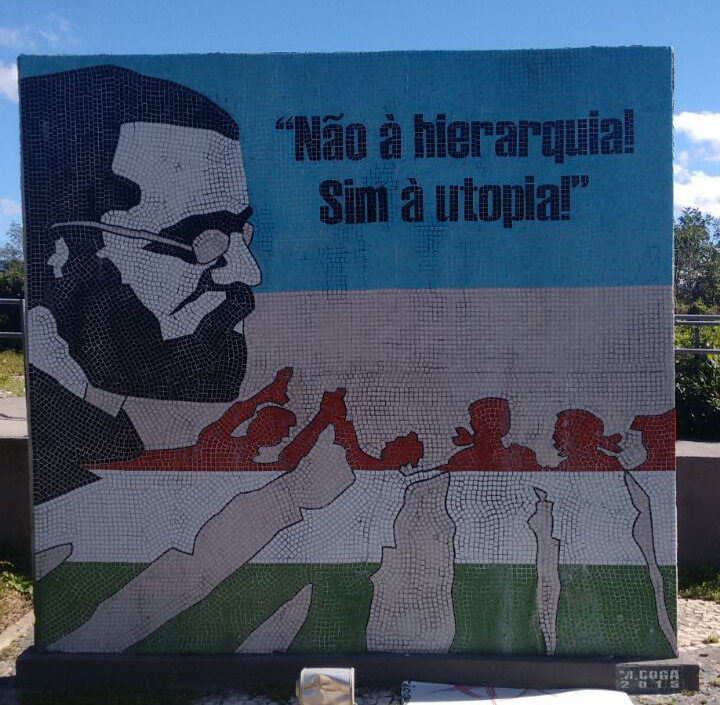
Artistic panel made of mosaics, in the Cecilia Colony Memorial.

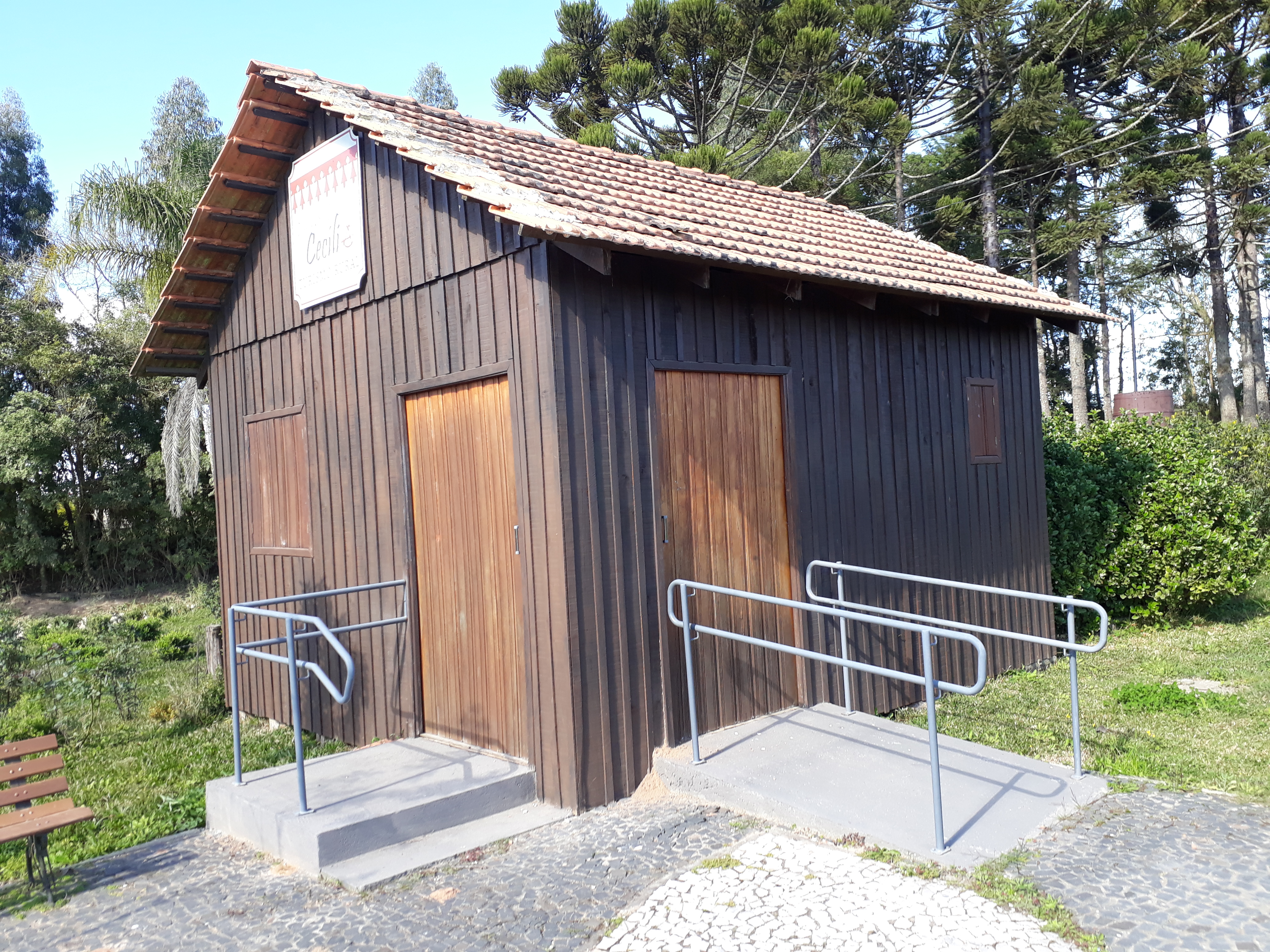
House of the Cecilia Colony Memorial.

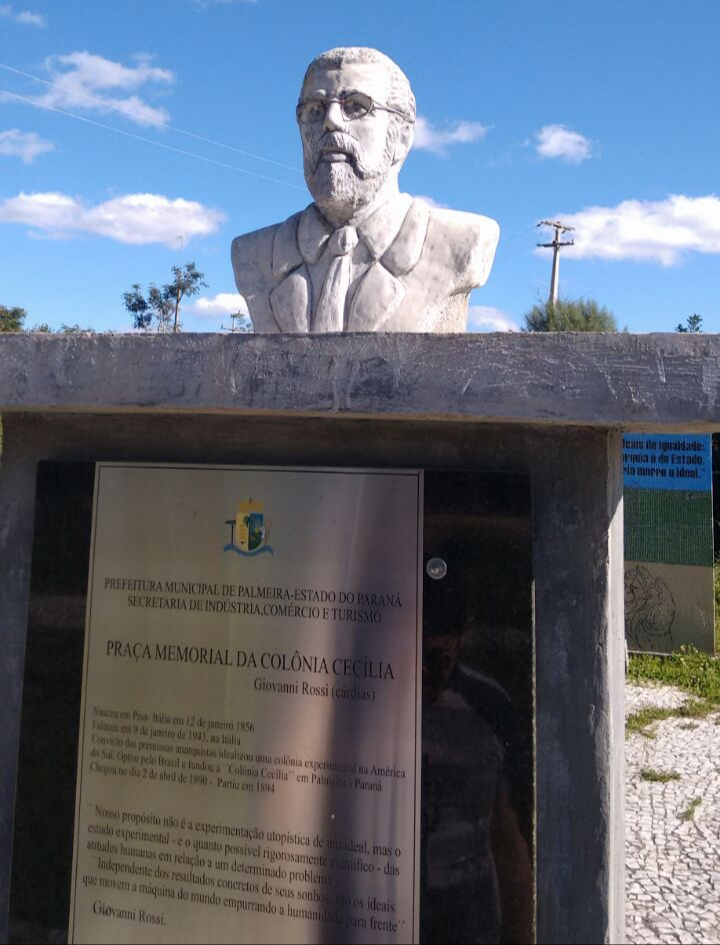
Bust of Giovanni Rossi at the Cecilia Colony Memorial.

== Bibliography ==
- de Mello Neto, Candido (2017). O anarquismo experimental de Giovanni Rossi: De Poggio al Mare à Colônia Cecília (in Portuguese). Ponta Grossa: Editora UEPG. ISBN 9788577982219. OCLC 1055562579.
- Gosi, Rosselina (1977). Il socialismo utopistico: Giovanni Rossi e la colonia anarchica Cecilia (in Italian). Milan: Moizzi Editore. OCLC 797909064.
- Betri, Maria Luisa (1971). Cittadella e Cecilia. Due esperimenti di colonia agricola socialista (in Italian). Milan: Edizioni del Gallo. OCLC 933991369.
- Zecca, R. (2008). Il positivismo anarchico di Giovanni Rossi. L'esperimento di una comune libertaria nel Brasile della fine del XIX secolo (Thesis) (in Italian). University of Milan.
- Felici, Isabelle (2001). La Cecilia, Histoire d'une communauté anarchiste et de son fondateur Giovanni Rossi. Collection commune mémoire (in French). Lyon: Atelier de création libertaire. ISBN 2905691697. OCLC 420255462.
- Felici, Isabelle (1994). Mario Fusco; Jean-Charles Vegliante (eds.). Les Italiens dans le mouvement anarchiste au Brésil, 1890-1920 (PhD thesis) (in French). Sorbonne Nouvelle University Paris 3. OCLC 492266242. Archived from the original on 16 October 2011.
