= Rebouças =

Coordinates: 25°36′22″S 50°41′34″W

- Municipality
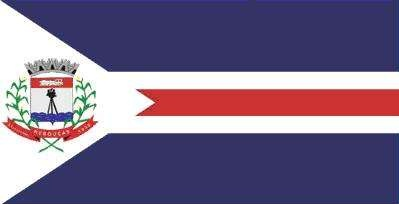
- Flag
- Interactive map of Rebouças
- Country: Brazil
- Region: Southern
- State: Paraná
- Mesoregion: Sudeste Paranaense
- Established: 1930
- Elevation: 2,674 ft (815 m)

Population (2021)
  - Total: 14,991
- Time zone: UTC−3 (BRT)
- HDI (2010): 0.711 – high

Rebouças is a municipality in the state of Paraná in the Southern Region of Brazil. Being filled with some hills in the surroundings and some parts of the city, the high structures are a tower in the hill of Mourão and the church in the city center. (being a part of the Catholic church), One dominant group of ethnicities in the city are Polish and Ukrainians.

== History ==
The village began in the place known as Butiazal and, around 1902, it was transferred to the place called Rio Azul where it is located. When the railroad reached the town of Rio Azul, the district was renamed Antônio Rebouças, who was the engineer who guided the construction of the railroad. Later, the name was simplified to Rebouças.

Created through State Law nº 2738, of March 31, 1930, and installed on September 21 of the same year, it was dismembered from São João do Triunfo.

== Geography ==
It has an area of 481.843 km² representing 0.2417% of the state, 0.0855% of the region and 0.0057% of the entire Brazilian territory. Located at latitude 25°37'15" south and longitude 50°41'34" west, the municipality is 815 m from altitude, and has 14,991 inhabitants (IBGE 2021 estimate).

=== Demographics ===
Census Data - 2000

Total population: 13,663

- Urban: 6,570
- Rural: 7,093
- Men: 7,002
- Women: 6,661

Human Development Index (HDI-M): 0.711

- IDH-M Income: 0.595
- HDI-M Longevity: 0.685
- HDI-M Education: 0.854

=== Economic growth ===
Rebouças has an GDP per capita of R$25,723 (Brazilian real) as of 2019, compared to R$20,498 (Brazilian real) in 2015 or R$11,639 (Brazilian real) in 2010. Although it is growing, the Brazilian Real has devaluated over time.

== Administration ==
- Mayor: Luiz Everaldo Zak (2021–2024)
- President of the city councilmen: Carlos Hirt Junior

== Transport ==
The municipality of Rebouças is served by the following highways:

- BR-153, the "Transbrasiliana", on its stretch União da Vitória to Jacarezinho (connecting Santa Catarina to São Paulo.
- PR-364, which connects the city to the municipalities of Irati and São Mateus do Sul.

== The Judiciary ==
- Court Judge: James Byron W. Bordignon

== State Public Prosecutor's Office ==
- State Public Prosecutor / Public Attorney: Murilo Cezar Soares e Silva
- Brazil: Art.129, II, of the Federal Constitution, which, combined with art.197, assigns to Public Attorneys the institutional function of ensuring the proper application of health laws by the Public Powers and services of public relevance.

== See also ==
- List of municipalities in Paraná
