= Giovanni Rossi (anarchist) =

Italian writer and founder of utopian communities (1856–1943)

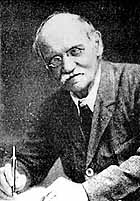
- Giovanni Rossi, Italian anarchist and founder of utopian communities
- Born: 11 January 1856; Pisa
- Died: 9 January 1943 (aged 86); Pisa
- Other names: Cardias
- Occupations: agronomist, veteranarian
- Known for: Founder of Brazilian utopian community Cecília Colony (1890–1894)

Giovanni Rossi (11 January 1856 – 9 January 1943) was an Italian anarchist, collectivist, writer, and founder of utopian communities. He was a promoter of cooperative libertarian colonies, free love, and the emancipation of women. The experimental libertarian Cecília Colony he founded in Brazil in 1890, inspired several fictional treatments including a feature film La Cecilia in 1976.

== Biography ==
Giovanni Rossi was born in Pisa in 1856. An agronomist and veterinarian by profession, he was influenced by French utopian socialists. His libertarian ideals included free love and the emancipation of women.

In 1875, he began the serial publication of a utopian novel, Un Comune Socialista, whose female protagonist is named Cecília. He continued to publish new chapters until 1891.

In 1878 he published his first book, using the pseudonym "Cardias", promoting his theory of anarchist collectives. He was arrested later that year for speaking against the state, but released in 1879 after charges were dropped. In 1886, with Andrea Costa, he founded and published a periodical titled Lo Sperimentale ("The Experiment").

In November 1887, Rossi founded and served as secretary of a collective in Cremona, "Colonia Cittadella", based on his ideas about cooperative agriculture.

== Libertarian colony in Brazil "La Cecília" ==
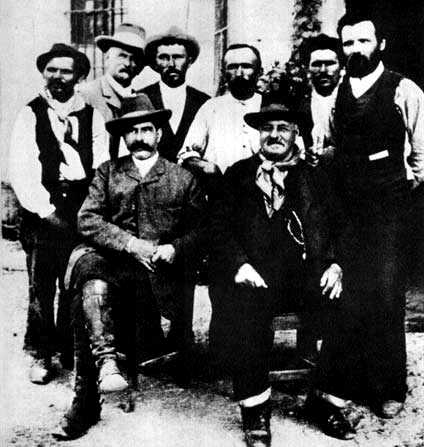
On 20 February 1890, a group of Italian anarchists, on the initiative of Giovanni Rossi, left Italy with the goal to found in Brazil an experimental libertarian colony named "La Cecília"

In February 1890, Rossi left Italy with a group of anarchists from Genoa, to go to Brazil's Paraná state where they established the Cecília Colony based on his ideas about anarchist communism and free love. This community, mostly of men, attained at one time a population of about 300, but closed in 1894. Although the colony did not survive, it inspired several fictional treatments including a 1949 novel by Afonso Schmidt, a 1976 film by Jean-Louis Comolli, and a Brazilian stage play titled Colônia Cecília by Renata Pallottini. Brazilian novelist Zélia Gattai, the granddaughter of an Italian anarchist who took part in the commune, also wrote about it in her 1979 memoir Anarquistas, graças a Deus ("Anarchists, thank God").

Rossi remained in Brazil until 1907, working as an agronomist and writing a novel titled Il Paraná nel XX Secolo. The novel imagines a future technological world where Belgium and Paraná have become great world powers.

In 1907 he returned to Italy, where he worked as a veterinarian and as a teacher, continuing to promote the formation of utopian colonies and the emancipation of women. He died in Pisa in 1943.
