= Balsa Nova =

- Municipality
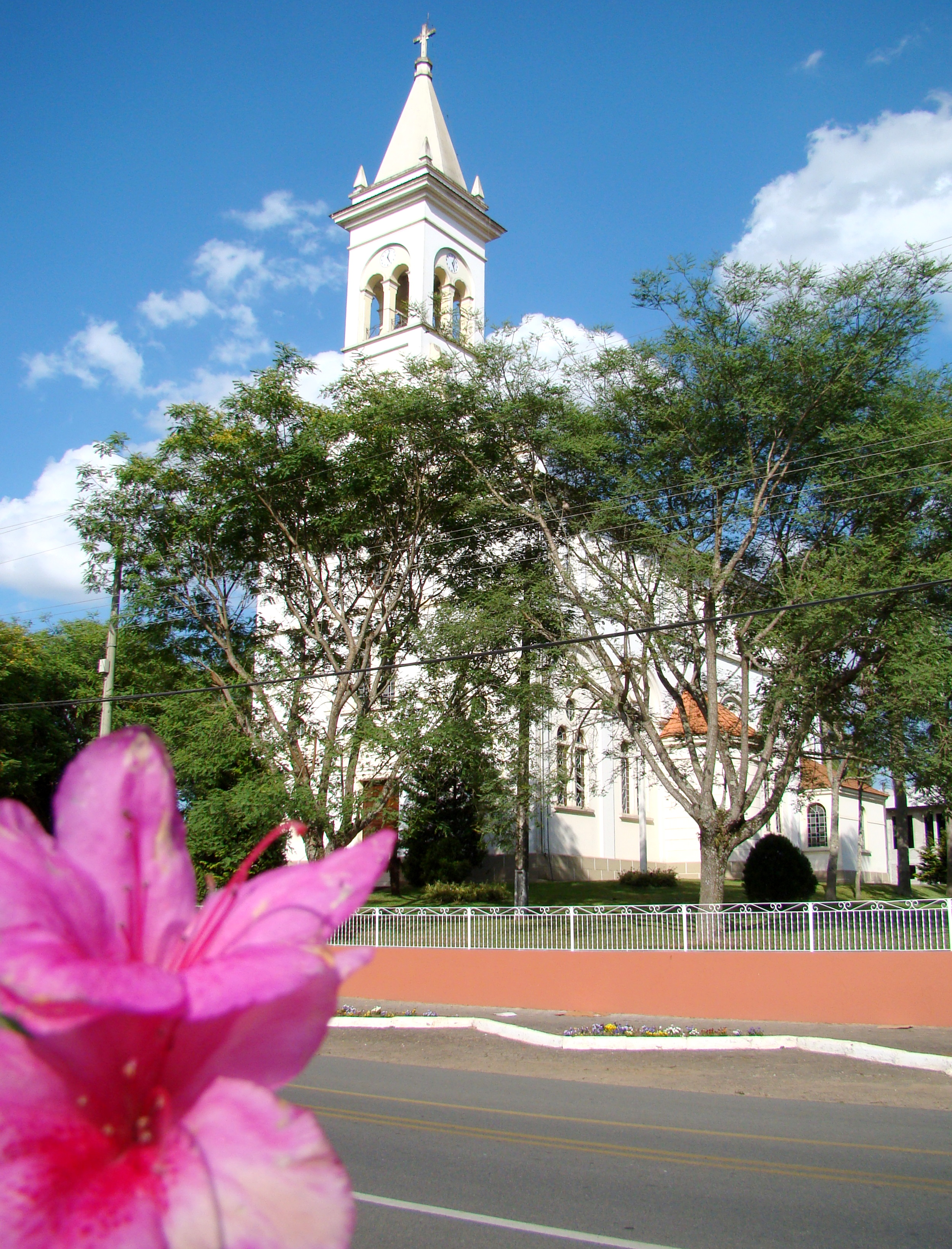
- Church of Balsa Nova

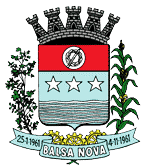
- Flag Coat of arms

- Balsa Nova in Paraná State

- Location in Brazil
- Coordinates: 25°36′0″S 49°37′0″W
- Country: Brazil
- Region: Southern
- State: Paraná
- Mesoregion: Metropolitana de Curitiba
- Established: November 4, 1961

Government
  - Mayor: Luiz Claudio Costa

Area
  - Total: 134.721 sq mi (348.926 km^{2})
- Elevation: 2,838 ft (865 m)

Population (2020)
  - Total: 13,092
  - Density: 97.179/sq mi (37.521/km^{2})
- Time zone: UTC−3 (BRT)

Balsa Nova is a municipality in the state of Paraná in the Southern Region of Brazil. It has a population of 13,092 and covers 348.926 square kilometres (134.721 mi^{2}). Balsa Nova borders the municipalities of Araucária, Campo Largo, Contenda, Lapa, Palmeira and Porto Amazonas, all in the east of the state of Paraná.

== History ==
Balsa Nova was settled by Carajó people, an Atlantic coast-based subgroup of the Guaraní people, prior to the arrival of the Portuguese. The Carajó used the present-day area of Balsa Nova along the Iguaçu as an outpost. The area served as a crossing ground for cattle drovers moving livestock and goods to the south of Brazil. The Sierra of São Luiz do Purunã provided an open area for cattle. The first settlement in the area dates to 1702, and the Capela Nossa Senhora do Carmo, later known as the Capela de Nossa Senhora da Conceição do Tamunduá, was built in 1709. The area was referred to variously as Rodeio, Rodeiozinho, or Rodeio Grande; all are references to cattle farming.

The settlers in the late 18th century started farms along the Iguaçu for their cattle and crop irrigation. The small settlement was isolated and lacked road or rail connections to other areas of Paraná. Crossing the Iguaçu was only canoe. Galdino Chaves received permission from the federal government in 1884 to build a ferry crossing, which he constructed at Ana Chaves. The first ferry was of weak construction and was destroyed in a flood. Chaves received funding from the government to build a secure ferry in 1891, this time a modern ferry aided by a steel cable. The new ferry became both a success and a landmark, and the area became known as Balsa Nova, Portuguese for "new ferry."

The new ferry and the opening of the railroad in Paraná spurred the export of timber and yerba mate from Balsa Nova. The town was named João Eugênio in 1938, but returned to the name Balsa Nova in 1954 as a district of Campo Largo. Balsa Nova separated from Campo Largo on November 4, 1961, and became an independent municipality.

== Districts ==
Balsa Nova is divided into three districts: Balsa Nova (the city seat), Bugre, and São Luiz do Purunã.

== Capela de Nossa Senhora da Conceição ==
The Capela de Nossa Senhora da Conceição (Chapel of Our Lady of the Immaculate Conception) is the oldest structure in Balsa Nova. It was constructed between 1727 and 1730 by Captain Antônio Tigre. Tigre had requested an image of Our Lady of the Immaculate Conception. The image arrived in Brazil and was housed in Curitiba and moved to the chapel at its opening in 1730. The chapel fell into ruins and the image of Our Lady of the Immaculate Conception was transferred to Palmeira in 1837. The structure is a protected heritage site of the State of Paraná.

== See also ==
- List of municipalities in Paraná
