= Zélia Gattai =

Brazilian photographer and author (1916–2008)

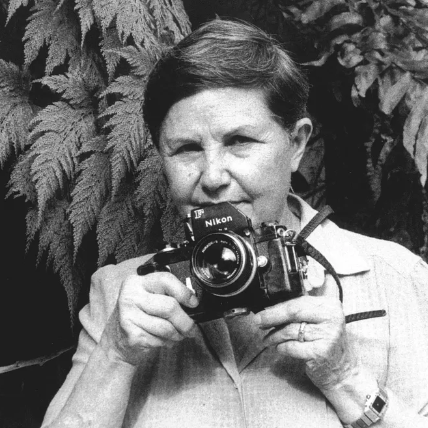
- Zélia Gattai
- Born: July 2, 1916; São Paulo, Brazil
- Died: May 17, 2008 (aged 91); Salvador, Bahia, Brazil
- Education: University of Sorbonne (BA)
- Spouses: Aldo Veiga (m. 1936; div. 1944) Jorge Amado (m. 1945; died 2001)
- Children: 3
- Awards: See "Awards and honours" section

Zélia Gattai Amado de Faria (July 2, 1916 – May 17, 2008) was a Brazilian photographer, memoirist, novelist and author of children's literature, as well as a member of the Brazilian Academy of Letters. Gattai wrote 14 literary works, including children's books, and her own personal memoirs have been widely published.

== Biography ==
Zélia Gattai was born in São Paulo city in the neighborhood of Paraíso, state of São Paulo, on July 2, 1916, to a family of Italian immigrants. Gattai's father, Ernesto Gattai, was an anarchist and came from the region of Veneto, following the social anarchist experiment called Colônia Cecília that sought to create an anarchist community in the Brazilian jungle. Her father was arrested in 1938 due to political oppression under the Vargas Estado Novo regime. Gattai lived in Paraíso, São Paulo for her entire adolescence.

In the 1930s, Zélia Gattai entered the intellectual and social circles of the modernists of São Paulo and Rio de Janeiro, becoming a friend of personalities such as Oswald de Andrade, Lasar Segall, Tarsila do Amaral, Mário de Andrade, Rubem Braga, Zora Seljan, Paulo Mendes de Almeida, Carlos Lacerda, Aldo Bonadei, Vinícius de Moraes and others. At the age of 20, Zélia Gattai married Communist militant Aldo Veiga and had her first child, Luís Carlos Veiga, with him. Their marriage ended after eight years and Gattai ended up falling in love with writer and communist Jorge Amado. The new couple decided to live together in 1945 and had their first child together, João Jorge Amado, in 1946.

=== Europe ===
Due to political condemnation by the Vargas regime, Gattai and her family were forced to leave Brazil and decided to relocate to Europe. The family spent the first part of the five-year exile in Paris where Gattai used the opportunity to get a degree in French Civilization, Phonetics, and Language at the university of Sorbonne in 1949. They later relocated to Prague where they lived from 1950 to 1952. It is in Prague that their third child, Paloma Jorge Amado, was born and Gattai discovered her passion for photography.

=== Return to Brazil ===
The family returned to Brazil in 1952 and moved into Gattai's parents house in Rio de Janeiro for the next eleven years. In 1963, the family moved to Salvador in the state of Bahia and would remain there for the remainder of Gattai's life. While living in Salvador, Gattai began to focus on her literary career.

Zélia Gattai died in Salvador on May 17, 2008, at the age of 91.

== Literary career ==
Gattai began her literary career in 1979 with an autobiography about her early life and the reality of Italian immigrants in Brazil, titled Anarquistas, Graças a Deus ("Anarchists, Thanks to God"). This memoir quickly became a bestseller and it was dramatized as a miniseries directed by Walter Avancini and created by the Globo Television Network in 1984 which allowed it to capture a large audience. Throughout her career, Gattai explored many genres including memoirs, children's literature, and romance novels. Many of her publications also included photography taken by Gattai that allowed her to create photo-biographies to further her story. In total, Gattai wrote 14 works including three successful children's books, ten memoirs and one romance novel.

On the death of Amado in 2001, Gattai was elected to the vacant 23rd seat in the Brazilian Academy of Letters.

== Publications ==
- Anarquistas graças a Deus - 1979 (memoirs)
- Um chapéu para viagem - 1982 (memoirs)
- Senhora dona do baile - 1984 (memoirs)
- Reportagem incompleta - 1987 (photobiography)
- Jardim de inverno - 1988 (memoirs)
- Pipistrelo das mil cores - 1989 (children's fiction)
- O segredo da rua 18 - 1991 (children's fiction)
- Chão de meninos - 1992 (memoirs)
- Crônica de uma namorada - 1995 (novel)
- A casa do Rio Vermelho - 1999 (memoirs)
- Cittá di Roma - 2000 (memoirs)
- Jonas e a sereia - 2000 (children's fiction)
- Códigos de família - 2001 (memoirs)
- Jorge Amado um baiano sensual e romântico - 2002 (memoirs)
- Vacina de Sapo e outras lembranças - 2005 (memoirs)

== Awards and honours ==
Throughout her literary career, Gattai was recognized with many awards and honors. She was given the following awards:

- Prêmio Dante Alighieri (Dante Alighieri Award) - 1980
- Prêmio Revelação Literária, concedido pela Associação de Imprensa (Literary Revelation Award, given by the Press Association) - 1980
- Diploma de Sócia Benemérita da Ordem Brasileira dos Poetas da Literatura de Cordel (Certificate of Meritorious Partner of the Brazilian Order of the Poets of Chapter Books)
- Diploma de Madrinha dos Trovadores, concedido pela Ordem Brasileira dos Poetas da Literatura de Cordel (Certificate of Mother of Troubadours, given by the Brazilian Order of the Poets of Chapter Books)
- Medalha do Mérito Castro Alves, da Secretaria da Educação e Cultura do Estado da Bahia (The Castro Alves Medal of Merit, given by the Secretary of Education and Culture of the state of Bahia) - 1987
- Diploma de Reconhecimento do Povo Carioca pelos relevantes serviços prestados à Cultura e ao Turismo, da Prefeitura da Cidade do Rio de Janeiro (Certificate of Recognition of the People of Rio de Janeiro for the services given to the Culture and Tourism of the City of Rio de Janeiro)
- Prêmio Destaque do Ano (Highlight of the year Award) - 1988
- Diploma de Magnífica Amiga dos Trovadores Capixabas, Espírito Santo (Certificate of Magnificent Friend of the Trovadores Capixabas, Espiritu Santo) - 1991
- Comenda das Artes e das Letras dada pela ministra da França, Caterine Trautmann (Commendation of the Arts and the Letters given by the French minister, Caterine Trautmann) - 1998
- Comenda Maria Quitéria pela Câmara Municipal de Salvador (Commendation Maria Quitéria given by the Town Hall of Salvador) - 1999

== Titles ==
In her lifetime, Gattai was also awarded the following titles:

- Placa “As dez mulheres mais bem sucedidas do Brasil” pela Mac Keen (Named in "The ten most successful women in Brazil" by Mac Keen) - 1980
- Título de Sócia Benemérita do Clube Baiano da Trova (Title of Meritorious Partner by the Club of Baiano da Trova) - 1981
- Título de Cidadã Honorária da Cidade de Salvador, Bahia (Title of Honorary Citizen of the City of Salvador, Bahia) - 1984
- Título de Cidadã Honorária da Cidade de Mirabeau (Title of Honorary Citizen of the City of Mirabeau) - 1985
- Título no grau de Grande Oficial da Ordem do Infante Dom Henrique, concedido pelo governo português (Title in the rank of Great Officer of the Order of the Infante Dom Henrique, given by the Portuguese government) - 1986
- Eleita A Mulher do Ano pelo Conselho Nacional da Mulher (Elected Woman of the Year by the National Council of Women) - 1989
