= Antônio Olinto, Paraná =

Coordinates: 25°59′9″S 50°11′49″W

Antônio Olinto
- Municipality
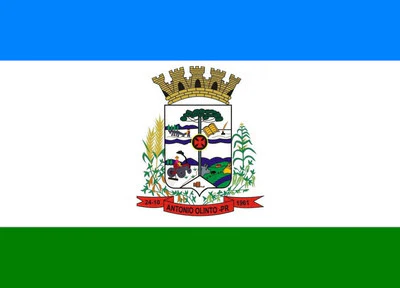
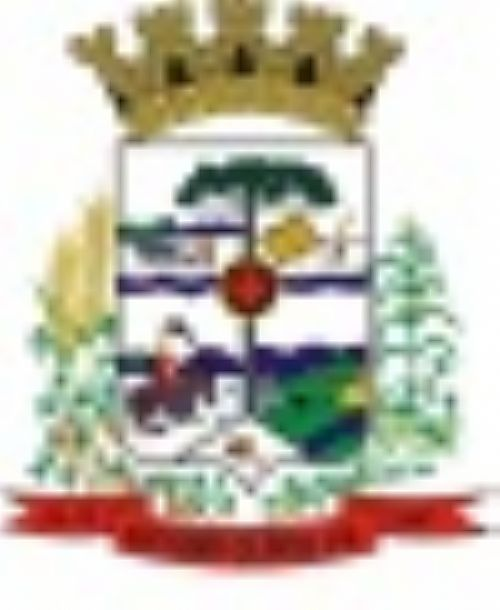
- Flag Coat of arms
- Interactive map of Antônio Olinto
- Country: Brazil
- Region: Southern
- State: Paraná
- Mesoregion: Sudeste Paranaense

Population (2020)
  - Total: 7,427
- Time zone: UTC−3 (BRT)

Antônio Olinto is a municipality in the state of Paraná in the Southern Region of Brazil.

== See also ==
- List of municipalities in Paraná
