= Fernandes Pinheiro =

Coordinates: 25.4128°S 50.5478°W

- Municipality
- Interactive map of Fernandes Pinheiro
- Country: Brazil
- Region: Southern
- State: Paraná
- Mesoregion: Sudeste Paranaense

Population (2020)
  - Total: 5,602
- Time zone: UTC−3 (BRT)

Fernandes Pinheiro is a municipality in the state of Paraná in the Southern Region of Brazil.

== Climate ==
Climate data for Fernandes Pinheiro, elevation 893 m (2,930 ft), (1963–2019)
Month	Jan	Feb	Mar	Apr	May	Jun	Jul	Aug	Sep	Oct	Nov	Dec	Year
Record high °C (°F)	35.6 (96.1)	34.8 (94.6)	35.5 (95.9)	32.6 (90.7)	30.1 (86.2)	29.0 (84.2)	28.2 (82.8)	32.2 (90.0)	33.8 (92.8)	35.5 (95.9)	36.6 (97.9)	35.2 (95.4)	36.6 (97.9)
Mean daily maximum °C (°F)	27.6 (81.7)	27.5 (81.5)	26.6 (79.9)	24.3 (75.7)	21.0 (69.8)	19.7 (67.5)	20.0 (68.0)	21.8 (71.2)	22.5 (72.5)	24.2 (75.6)	26.0 (78.8)	27.1 (80.8)	24.0 (75.3)
Daily mean °C (°F)	21.2 (70.2)	21.2 (70.2)	20.2 (68.4)	17.9 (64.2)	14.9 (58.8)	13.5 (56.3)	13.3 (55.9)	14.7 (58.5)	16.0 (60.8)	17.9 (64.2)	19.4 (66.9)	20.6 (69.1)	17.6 (63.6)
Mean daily minimum °C (°F)	16.8 (62.2)	17.0 (62.6)	16.0 (60.8)	13.6 (56.5)	10.5 (50.9)	9.0 (48.2)	8.5 (47.3)	9.5 (49.1)	11.3 (52.3)	13.3 (55.9)	14.5 (58.1)	15.9 (60.6)	13.0 (55.4)
Record low °C (°F)	16.8 (62.2)	17.0 (62.6)	16.0 (60.8)	13.6 (56.5)	10.5 (50.9)	9.0 (48.2)	8.5 (47.3)	9.5 (49.1)	11.3 (52.3)	13.3 (55.9)	14.5 (58.1)	15.9 (60.6)	8.5 (47.3)
Average precipitation mm (inches)	182.7 (7.19)	150.3 (5.92)	136.5 (5.37)	103.3 (4.07)	122.8 (4.83)	126.1 (4.96)	109.9 (4.33)	83.3 (3.28)	140.3 (5.52)	168.3 (6.63)	128.8 (5.07)	155.8 (6.13)	1,608.1 (63.3)
Average precipitation days (≥ 1.0 mm)	16	15	12	9	9	10	9	8	11	13	11	14	137
Average relative humidity (%)	82	82	82	82	83	84	81	77	78	79	77	79	81
Mean monthly sunshine hours	169.7	157.2	168.2	159.5	152.0	142.8	160.7	176.7	149.3	156.9	175.7	162.3	1,931
Source: IDR-Paraná

== See also ==
- List of municipalities in Paraná
