= São Mateus do Sul =

Coordinates: 25°52′S 50°23′W

- Municipality
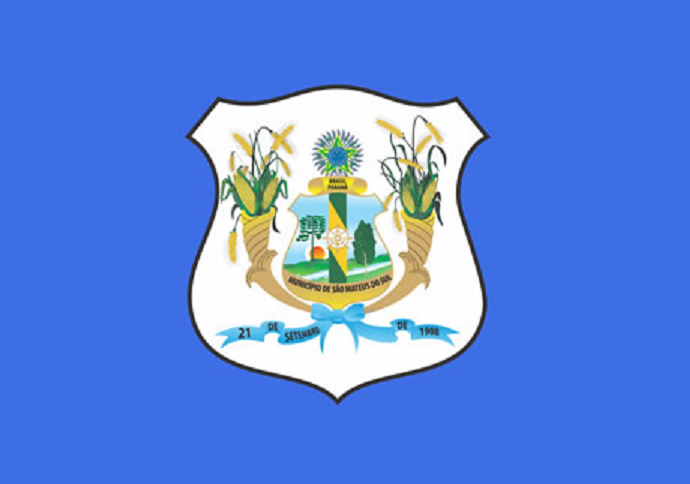
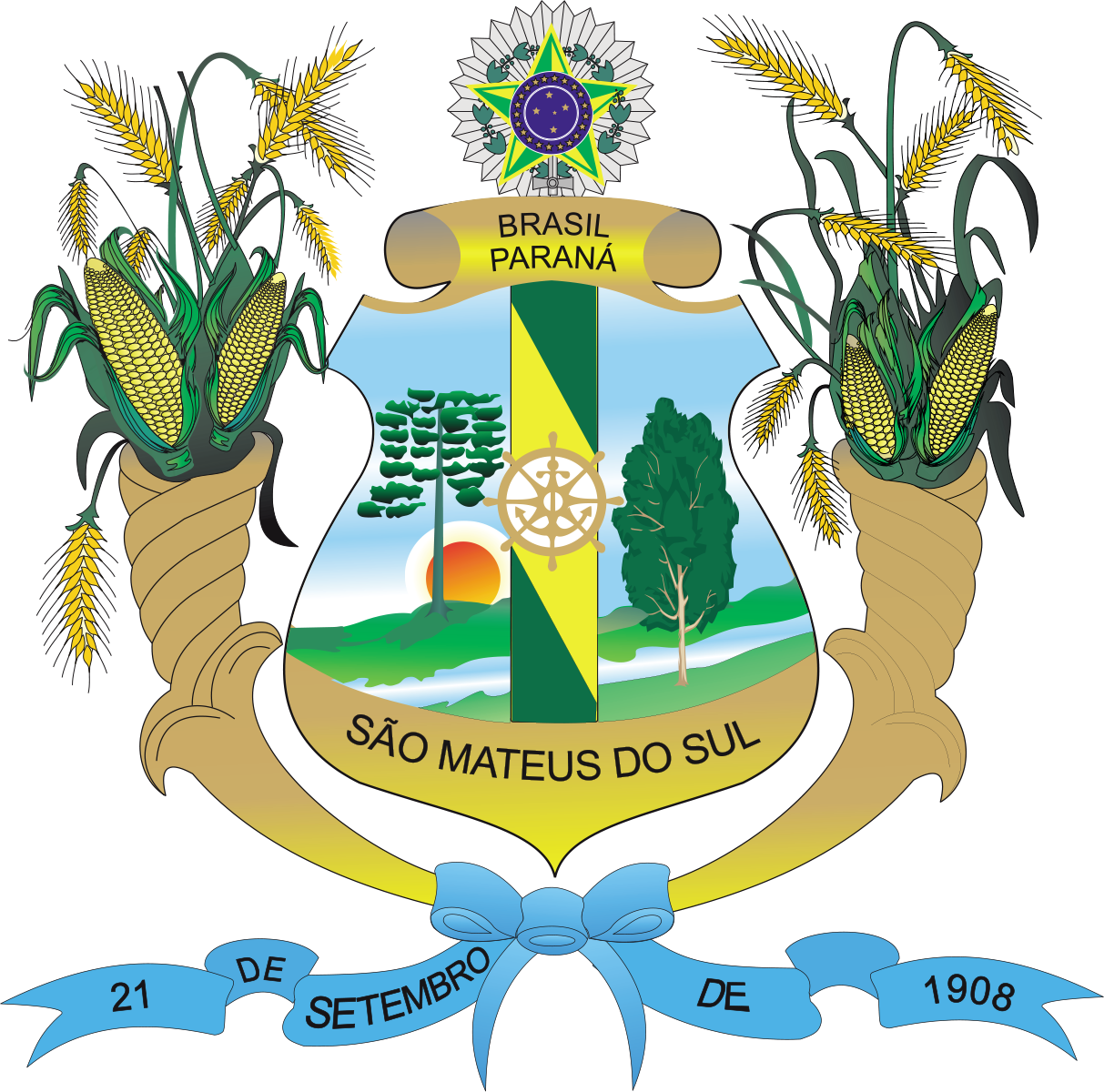
- Flag Coat of arms
- Interactive map of São Mateus do Sul
- Country: Brazil
- Region: Southern
- State: Paraná
- Mesoregion: Sudeste Paranaense

Population (2020)
  - Total: 46,705
- Time zone: UTC−3 (BRT)

São Mateus do Sul (St. Matthew of the South) is a municipality of the Brazilian state of Paraná, located in the southern region of the country.

== History ==
The village of São Mateus do Sul has emerged as landing and support sector the flags military launched by the governor of the capitania of São Paulo, Mr. Luiz de Souza Botelho e Mourao, with the goal of conquest of Guarapuava. It was the Lieutenant Bruno Costa Filgueiras, head of the Fourth Expedition, with 25 men, which was intended to Tibagi, who first popped in the lands of Sao Mateus do Sul in 1769. The first human ballast that was established here was composed of nationals, in the year of 1877. Subsequently tried to form a colony of Spaniards who did not adapt to the region, if scattered, leaving some few remnants. In 1855 the Germans arrived, attracted by the news of the existence of oil in the region, among them Rudolph Wolff and Gustavo Frederico Thenius. Initially the colony received the name of Porto Santa Maria, as a tribute to protective of wives and children of the founders. Later it was called Maria Augusta, in honor of the wife of the chief Engineer Joseph Carvalho Sobrinho, one of the administrators of the new colony. Finally received the name of São Mateus. In the year of 1890 headed by Sebastian Edmundo forerunner Celeste Woss Saporski, arrived at the 2.060 in number of 2000 families, establishing itself in colonies do Iguaçu, Canoes, Waterfall, Taquaral, White Water and Rio Claro (today municipality of Mallet). At the start the economy of the colony was based on agriculture and the extractivism, mainly of wood and grass-mate, principal riches of the region. With the advent of the steamship navigation in Iguaçu River, are São Mateus became the most important port and commercial center of the region. It was transformed into a municipality in 1908, by law 763 of day two April, having your installation journal if performed on day 21 of September of the same year. In 1909 it was constituted in Term Judiciary and in 1912 in the Head of the District, being its headquarters raised to the category of city. From 1943, by State Decree, the municipality has been renamed to São Mateus do Sul. With the end of the cycle of navigation of the Iguaçu River, in 1950, began a period of economic stagnation that struck the entire southern region. The resumption of growth occurred in the late 1960s, when Petrobras decided to deploy an experimental plant for the exploitation of existing shale in the municipality. With the industrial exploitation of this ore, São Mateus do Sul received a big boost in its industrial development. São Mateus do Sul account today with more than 40.000 inhabitants, the majority descendant of Polish immigrants of the 19th century, being one of the 40 most populous cities in the state. In 2021, the city won the title of "Polish capital of Paraná".

== Geography ==
The municipality has an area of 1.342 km², with a population estimated at more than 40.000 inhabitants. It is estimated that the majority, about 58% live in urban headquarters and 42% in the rural area, distributed in about 5 thousand small properties. According to the Regional Electoral Court, currently the municipality 1950-1993 more than 29.000 voters. São Mateus do Sul makes limits with the cities of Antonio Olinto, São João do Triunfo, Mallet, Paulo Frontin, Rebouças and Rio Azul, in the state of Paraná; and with Canoinhas and Três Barras, in the state of Santa Catarina. The water is abundant in the municipality, cut by Potinga and Iguaçu rivers, and bathed in the south by Negro, border with Santa Catarina. The climate of the city is described as humid subtropical mesothermic, having its cool summers, mild winters with occurrence of severe and frequent frosts. The area of the municipality is covered in yet more than 50%, by original vegetation of the Atlantic Forest. The seat of the municipality is at a distance of 150 km from Curitiba, 120 km from Ponta Grossa, 90 km from the União da Vitória and 240 km from the Port of Paranagua.

== Economy ==
Situated to the south of the state, distant 140 kilometers of Curitiba, the capital city of São Mateus do Sul stands out in the industrial area, by usina shale of Petrobras, an inexhaustible source of energy inputs and raw materials (oil, naphtha, industrial gas and sulfur) for the most diverse sectors of the industry and for the production of ceramic tiles of high quality, produced by Incepa.

The municipality account today with about 100 industries in different branches. The industry ervateira is another important activity, demonstrating the interest of the market in grass-mate of the municipality, considered one of the greatest Brazilian producers, with 50% of its area of native forests and orchard, still preserved. The most prominent companies are: Baldo S/A, Vier, Elizabeth, Maracanã, São Mateus and Rei Verde.

The crop and livestock production also has an important participation in the economy of the municipality, registering 6,300 properties in the municipal territory that is 1,340 km^{2}. The agricultural production of the municipality occupies the 23rd place in the ranking estadual, according to data from the Secretariat of Agriculture and Supply of Paraná (SEAB). Stand out as the main products: potatoes, corn, beans, mate, soybeans and tobacco. Pigs, cattle and poultry and its derivatives also exhibit growth.

Are Mateus do Sul stands for strong contribution inflows of the Circulation of Goods and Services tax (ICMS) state occupying the 19th position among the 399 municipalities, having currently the economic activity divided into 40% relating to agriculture and services and 60% for industry.
