= Palmeira, Paraná =

Municipality in Parana, Brazil

Palmeira
- Municipality
- Municipality of Palmeira
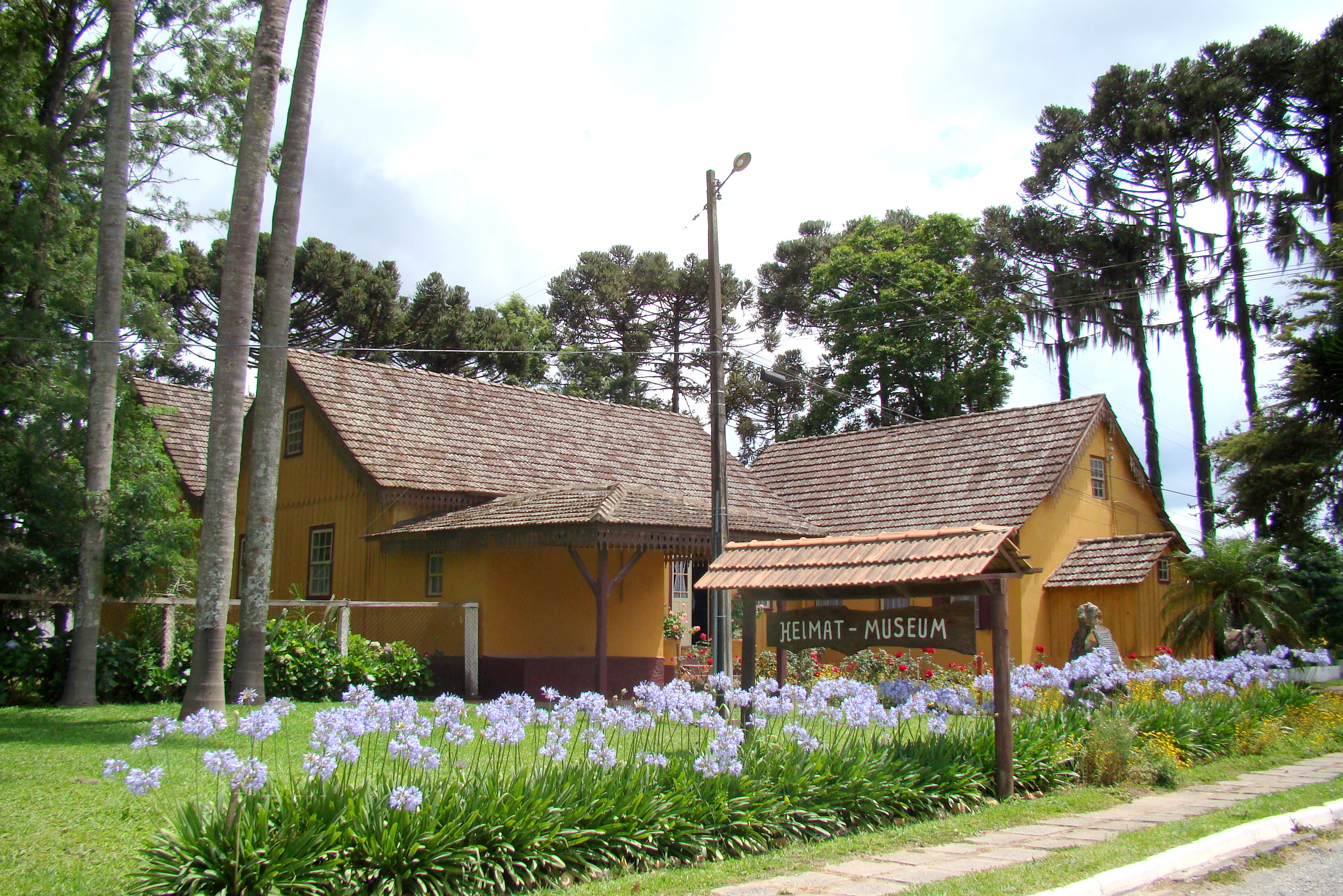
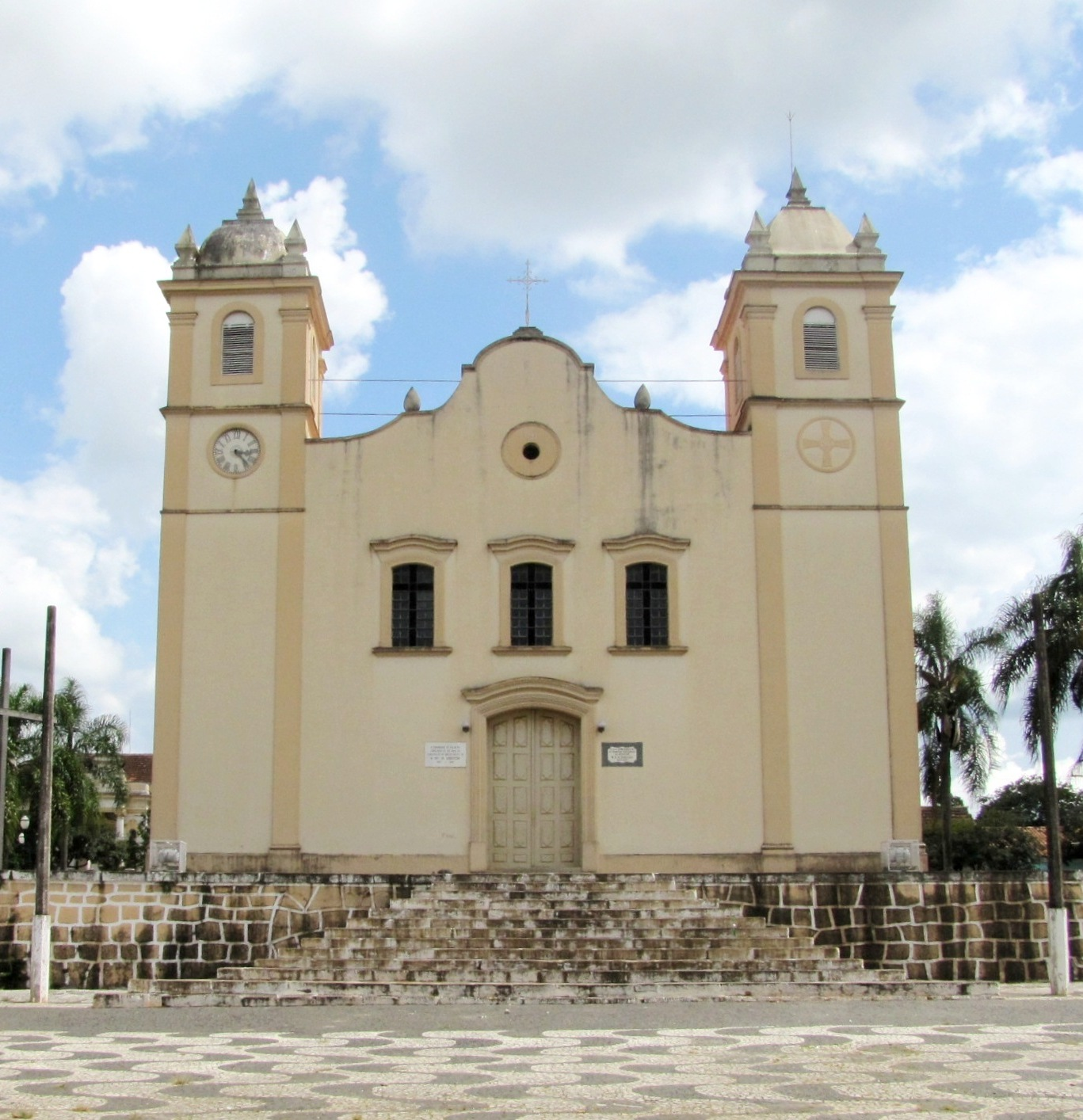
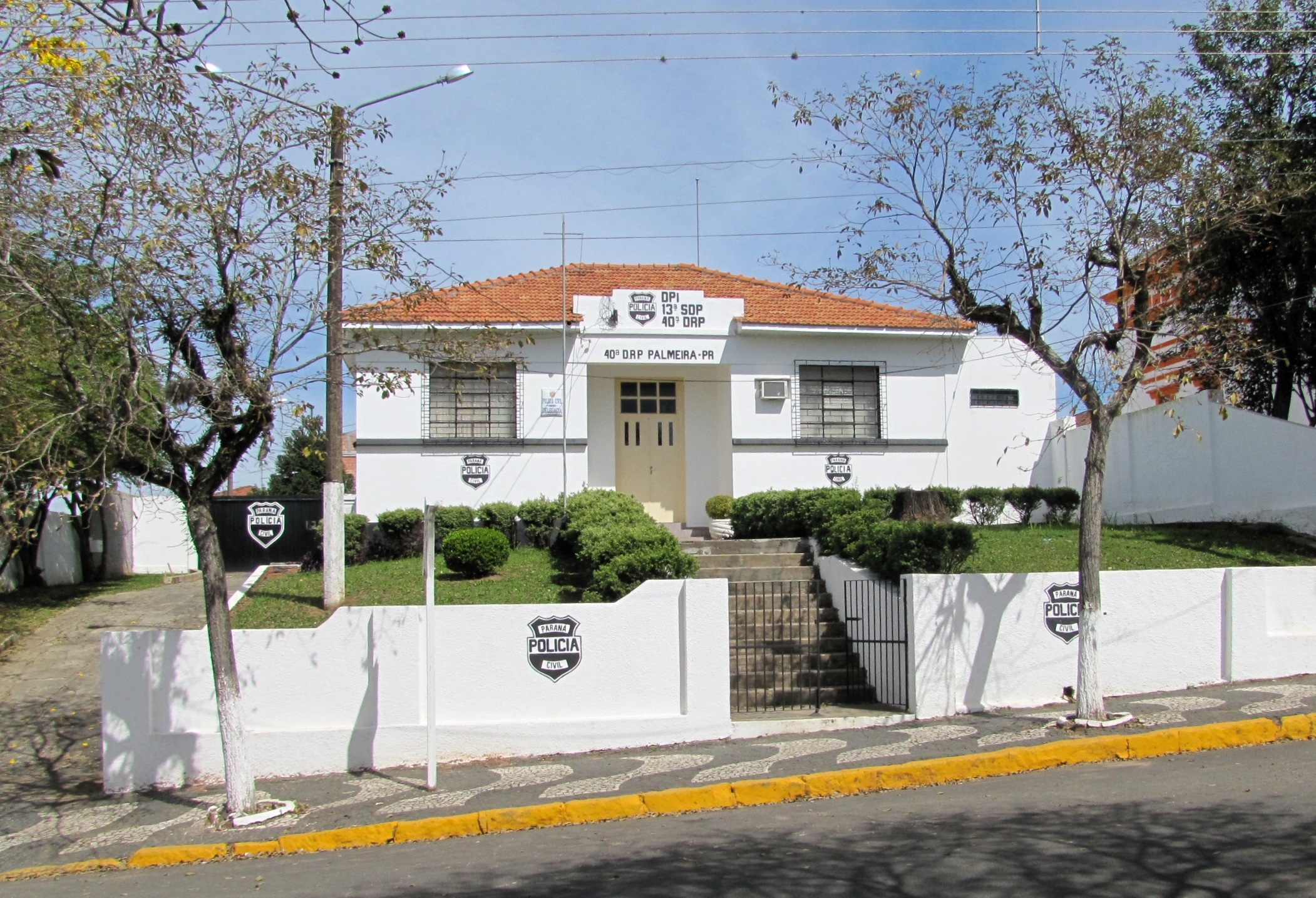
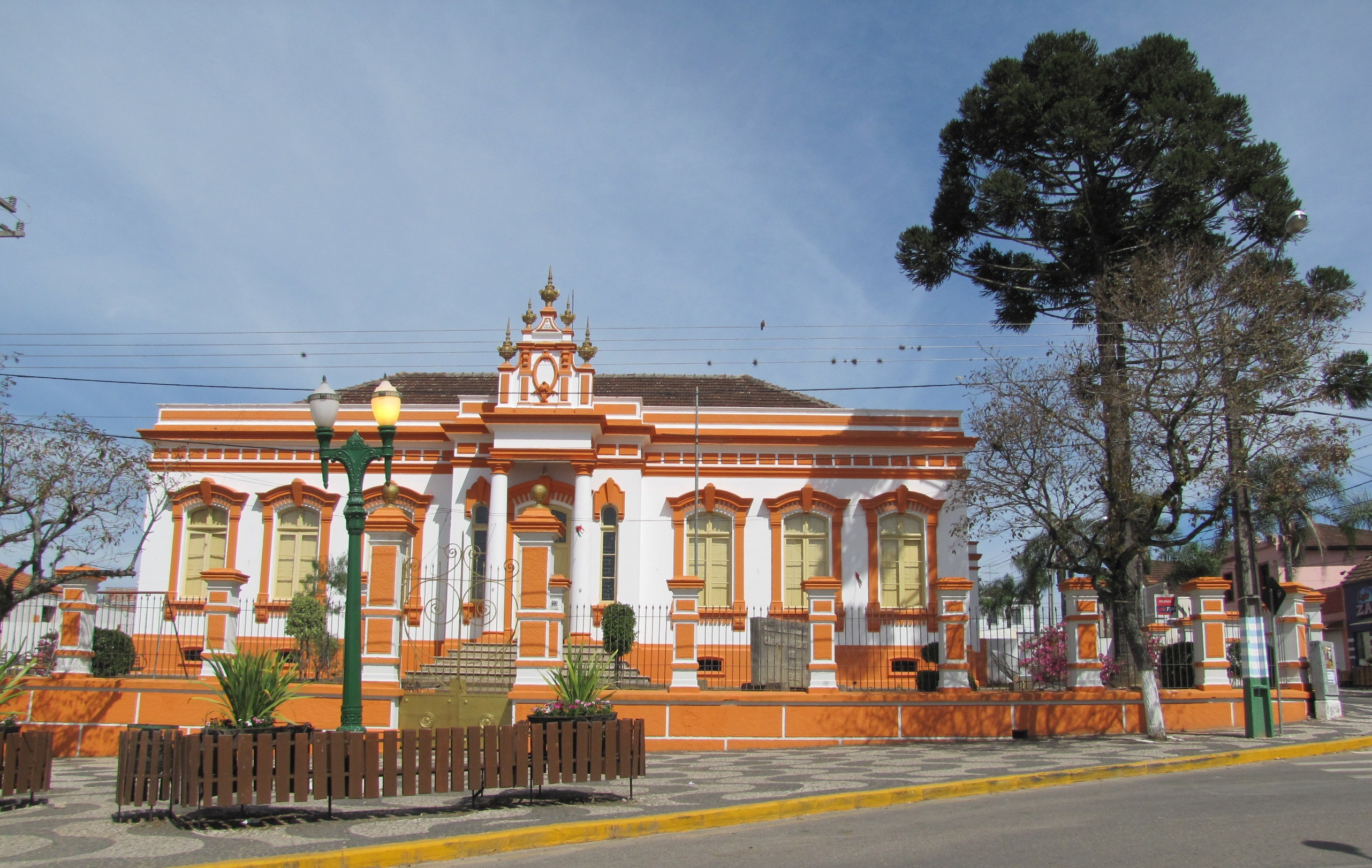
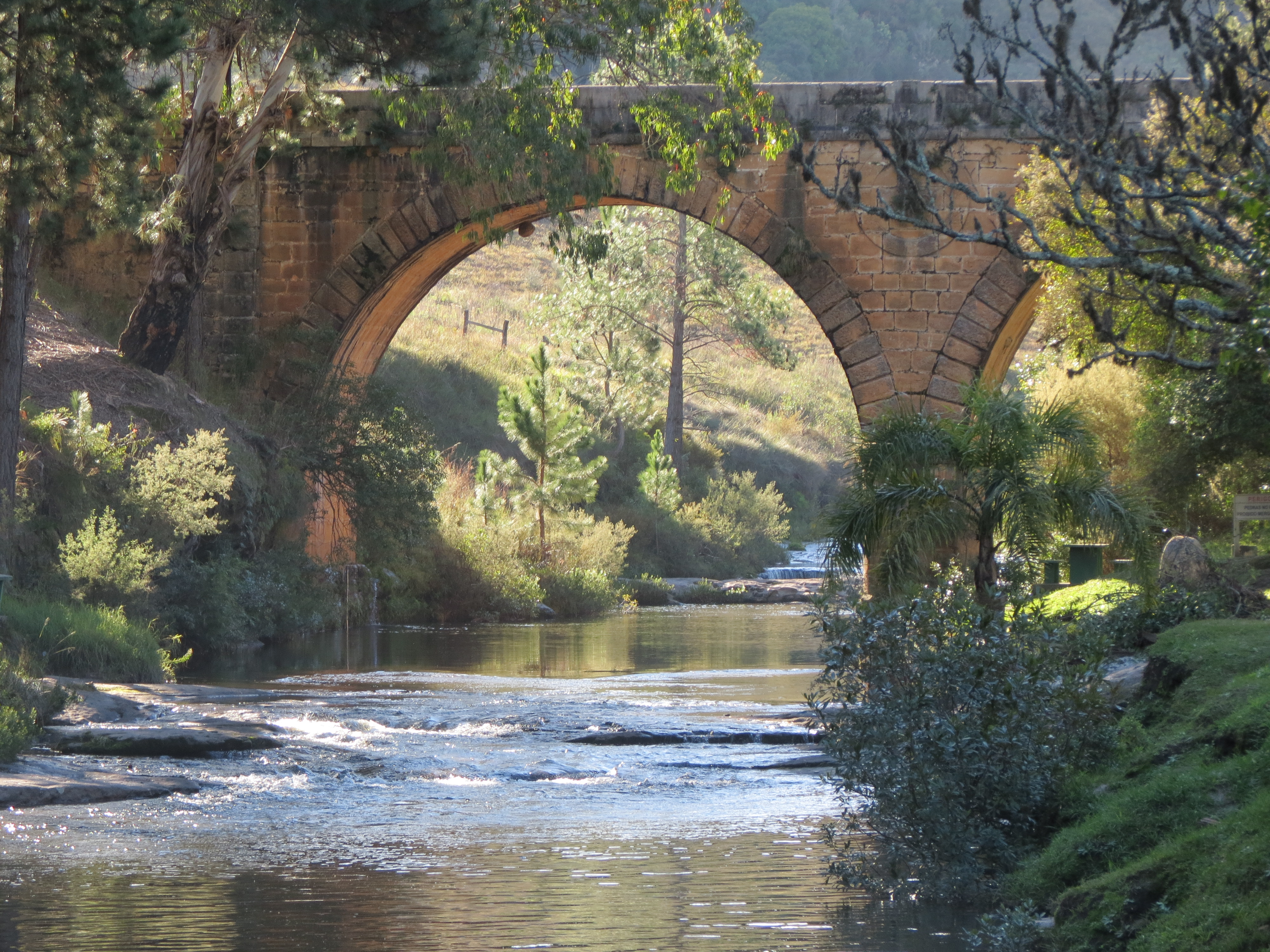
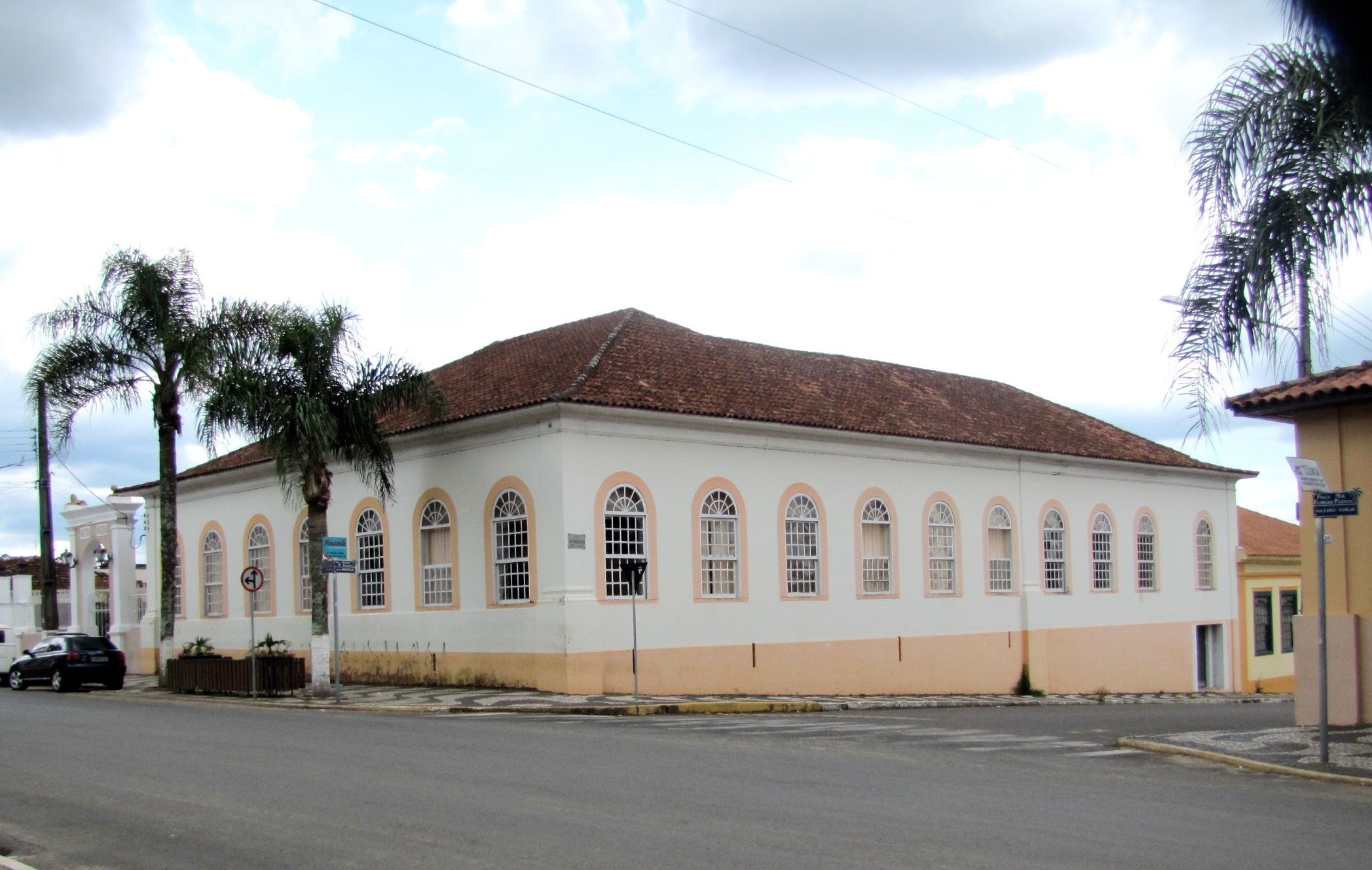

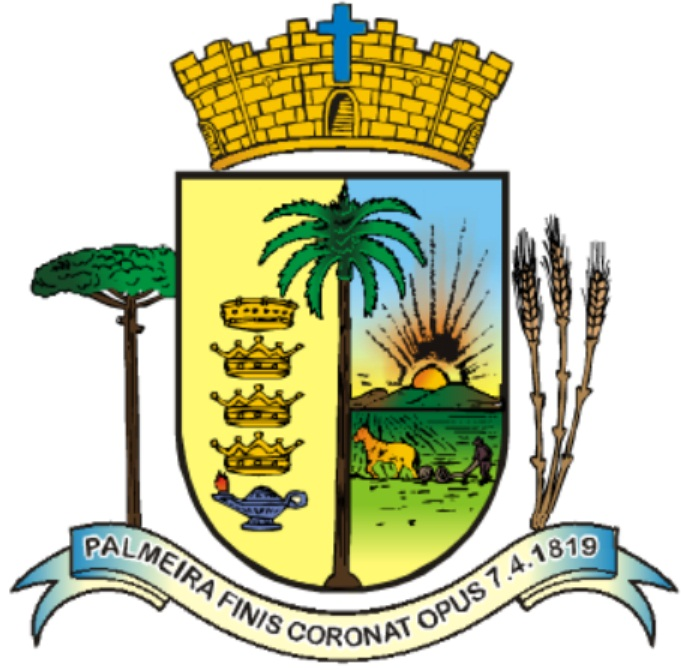
- Flag Coat of arms

- Location in Paraná
- Country: Brazil
- State: Paraná
- Region: South

Government
  - Mayor: Sérgio Luiz Belich (DEM)

Area
  - Total: 1,470.072 km^{2} (567.598 sq mi)
- Elevation: 867 m (2,844 ft)

Population (2021 est.)
  - Total: 34,109
  - Density: 23.202/km^{2} (60.094/sq mi)
- Time zone: UTC−3 (BRT)
- Postal code: 84130-000
- HDI (2010): 0.718 – high
- Website: Official website

Palmeira is a municipality in the state of Paraná in Brazil, in the micro-region of Ponta Grossa. It is situated at south latitude 25º25'46" and west longitude 50º00'23", at an altitude of 865 meters and 70 km (43 mi) from the state's capital, Curitiba. Its population as of 2020 was 33,994 inhabitants. Its area is of approximately 1465,1 km^{2} (5656.8 mi^{2}).

With the construction of the Caminho de Viamão in the eighteenth century, many villages were springing up in the Campos Gerais region. With the defined settlement immigrants came. The Russian-Germans in 1878, the Poles in 1888 and the Italians in 1890 led by Giovanni Rossi, with the latter formed the first anarchist colony of America, Cecilia Colony. And, in 1951, came the German Mennonites who founded the Witmarsum Colony and the Witmarsum Joint Agricultural Cooperative Ltd. (Cooperativa Mista Agropecuária Witmarsum Ltda) producer of dairy products, and poultry with Cancela brand. Created through State Law No. 238 of November 9, 1897, and installed on the same date, it was separated from Ponta Grossa.

Natural citizens from Palmeira are called palmeirenses.

== Etymology ==
The name is because the city was founded on a capon (forest in the middle of a clearing) previously called Capon of Palmeira (Capão da Palmeira), due to the presence of palms in the region.

== History ==
in work

== Heritage ==
The city's historical heritage include the Ponte dos Papagaios (Bridge of the Parrots), Ypiranga Football Club's (the city's football club) wooden bleaches, and the Cancela Farm House, a museum within Witmarsum Colony.

== Personalities ==
Palm was the birthplace of important characters in Paraná's and Brazil's history, including:

- Tibaji Baron and the Tibaji Viscountess.
- Jesuíno Marcondes de Oliveira e Sá, who participated in the Ministry of D. Pedro II during the Empire (Minister of Agriculture, Commerce and Public Works), and was the last president of the Province of Paraná.
- Heitor Stockler de França, Prince of Poets of Paraná.
- Alfredo Bertoldo Klas, was a private of the FEB, received many honors for bravery during World War Two, was a writer and former mayor of the city.
- Newton Stadler de Sousa, great journalist of Paraná.
- John Chede, state representative and mayor of Palmeira several times.
- Arthur Orlando Klas, dentist, writer and scholar of Palmeira's history. Younger brother of Alfredo Bertoldo Klas.
- Assad Kustandi Kardush, merchant and English teacher, born in Nazareth, Palestine, arriving in Palmeira in 1950, where he lived the rest of his life and died, in 1986.
- Metry Bacila, renowned scientist.
- Jorge Amin Bacila, doctor, practiced medicine in the city for 30 years and now lives in Curitiba, the state capital, aged 86. Even though he lost his hearing at age 4 he secured his place in medicine. Born December 1, 1920, he is still acting in his profession.
- Astrogildo de Freitas, historian and the first director of the Post Office of Paraná. Wrote three books on the history of Palmeira and Paraná's Post Office.
- Dom Alberto Gonçalves, first paranaense to be consecrated bishop.
- Oscar Teixeira de Oliveira, article and chronicle writer for journals.
- Maria Edite Lederer, poet with four edited books.
- Ivo Arzua Pereira, politician and writer, once mayor of Curitiba and Minister of Agriculture.
- Francisco Sinke Ferreira, humanitarian doctor.
- Dr. Moisés Marcondes, doctor and writer.
- Coronel Antônio de Sá Camargo, one of the founders of the city of Guarapuava.
