= Porto Amazonas =

Coordinates: 25°33′S 49°54′W

- Municipality
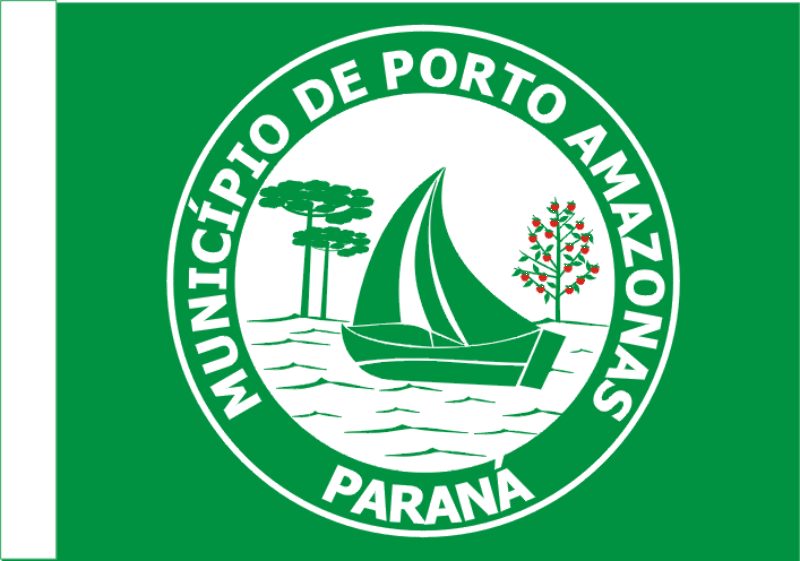
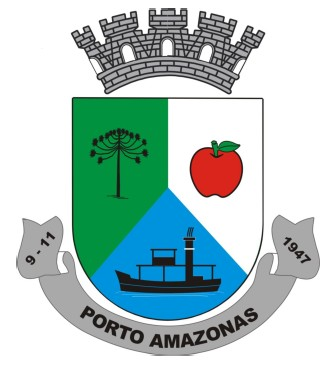
- Flag Coat of arms
- Interactive map of Porto Amazonas
- Country: Brazil
- Region: Southern
- State: Paraná
- Mesoregion: Metropolitana de Curitiba

Population (2020)
  - Total: 4,874
- Time zone: UTC−3 (BRT)

Porto Amazonas is a municipality in the state of Paraná in the Southern Region of Brazil.

== See also ==
- List of municipalities in Paraná
