= List of largest cities in Brazil by state =

== North Region ==
State	City	Population	Population year	Notes	Ref
Acre	Cruzeiro do Sul	89,072	2021		
Acre	Rio Branco	413,418	2021	Capital	
Amapá	Macapá	512,000	2023	Capital	
Amapá	Santana	119,610	2018		
Amazonas	Coari	85,910	2020		
Amazonas	Itacoatiara	104,046	2021		
Amazonas	Manacapuru	99,613	2021		
Amazonas	Manaus	2,255,903	2021	Capital	
Amazonas	Parintins	116,439	2021		
Amazonas	Tefé	59,250	2021		
Pará	Abaetetuba	160,439	2021		
Pará	Altamira	117,320	2021		
Pará	Ananindeua	540,410	2021	Part of the Metropolitan Region of Belém	
Pará	Barcarena	129,333	2021		
Pará	Belém	1,506,420	2021	Capital	
Pará	Bragança	130,122	2021		
Pará	Breves	104,280	2021		
Pará	Cametá	140,814	2021		
Pará	Castanhal	205,667	2021		
Pará	Itaituba	101,541	2021		
Pará	Marabá	287,664	2021		
Pará	Marituba	135,812	2021	Part of the Metropolitan Region of Belém	
Pará	Paragominas	115,838	2021		
Pará	Parauapebas	218,787	2021		
Pará	Redenção	86,326	2021		
Pará	Santarém	308,339	2021		
Pará	São Félix do Xingu	135,732	2021		
Pará	Tailândia	111,554	2021		
Pará	Tucuruí	116,605	2021		
Rondônia	Ariquemes	111,148	2021		
Rondônia	Cacoal	86,416	2021		
Rondônia	Ji-Paraná	131,026	2021		
Rondônia	Porto Velho	548,952	2021	Capital	
Rondônia	Vilhena	104,517	2021		
Roraima	Boa Vista	436,591	2021	Capital	
Tocantins	Araguaína	186,245	2021		
Tocantins	Gurupi	88,428	2021		
Tocantins	Palmas	313,349	2021	Capital	

== Northeast Region ==
State	City	Population	Population year	Notes	Ref
Alagoas	Arapiraca	234,309	2021		
Alagoas	Maceió	1,031,597	2021	Capital	
Alagoas	Palmeira dos Índios	73,452	2021		
Alagoas	Penedo	64,005	2021		
Alagoas	União dos Palmares	65,963	2021		
Bahia	Alagoinhas	153,023	2021		
Bahia	Barreiras	158,432	2021		
Bahia	Camaçari	309,208	2021	Part of the Metropolitan Region of Salvador	
Bahia	Eunápolis	115,360	2021		
Bahia	Feira de Santana	624,107	2021		
Bahia	Ilhéus	157,639	2021		
Bahia	Itabuna	214,123	2021		
Bahia	Jacobina	80,749	2021		
Bahia	Jequié	156,277	2021		
Bahia	Juazeiro	219,544	2021		
Bahia	Lauro de Freitas	204,669	2021	Part of the Metropolitan Region of Salvador	
Bahia	Luís Eduardo Magalhães	92,671	2021		
Bahia	Paulo Afonso	152,529	2021		
Bahia	Porto Seguro	140,252	2006		
Bahia	Salvador	2,900,319	2021	Capital	
Bahia	Santo Antônio de Jesus	103,204	2021		
Bahia	Simões Filho	137,117	2021	Part of the Metropolitan Region of Salvador	
Bahia	Teixeira de Freitas	164,290	2021		
Bahia	Valença	97,873	2021		
Bahia	Vitória da Conquista	343,643	2021		
Ceará	Aquiraz	81,581	2021		
Ceará	Canindé	77,484	2021		
Ceará	Caucaia	368,918	2021	Part of the Metropolitan Region of Fortaleza	
Ceará	Crateús	75,241	2021		
Ceará	Crato	113,913	2021		
Ceará	Fortaleza	2,703,391	2021	Capital	
Ceará	Iguatu	103,633	2021		
Ceará	Itapipoca	131,687	2021		
Ceará	Juazeiro do Norte	278,264	2021		
Ceará	Maracanaú	230,986	2021	Part of the Metropolitan Region of Fortaleza	
Ceará	Maranguape	131,677	2021	Part of the Metropolitan Region of Fortaleza	
Ceará	Pacatuba	85,647	2021		
Ceará	Quixadá	88,899	2021		
Ceará	Quixeramobim	82,455	2021		
Ceará	Russas	79,550	2021		
Ceará	Sobral	212,437	2021		
Ceará	Tianguá	77,111	2021		
Maranhão	Açailândia	113,783	2021		
Maranhão	Bacabal	105,094	2021		
Maranhão	Balsas	96,951	2021		
Maranhão	Barra do Corda	88,895	2021		
Maranhão	Buriticupu	73,595	2021		
Maranhão	Caxias	166,159	2021		
Maranhão	Codó	123,368	2021		
Maranhão	Imperatriz	259,980	2021		
Maranhão	Paço do Lumiar	125,265	2021		
Maranhão	Pinheiro	84,160	2021		
Maranhão	Santa Inês	89,927	2021		
Maranhão	Santa Luzia	73,105	2021		
Maranhão	São José de Ribamar	180,345	2021	Part of the Metropolitan Region of São Luís	
Maranhão	São Luís	1,115,932	2021	Capital	
Maranhão	Timon	171,317	2021		
Paraíba	Bayeux	97,519	2021	Part of the Metropolitan Region of João Pessoa	
Paraíba	Campina Grande	413,830	2021		
Paraíba	João Pessoa	825,796	2021	Capital	
Paraíba	Patos	108,766	2021		
Paraíba	Santa Rita	138,093	2021	Part of the Metropolitan Region of João Pessoa	
Pernambuco	Abreu e Lima	100,698	2021	Part of the Metropolitan Region of Recife	
Pernambuco	Araripina	85,301	2021		
Pernambuco	Belo Jardim	76,930	2021		
Pernambuco	Cabo de Santo Agostinho	210,796	2021	Part of the Metropolitan Region of Recife	
Pernambuco	Camaragibe	159,945	2021	Part of the Metropolitan Region of Recife	
Pernambuco	Carpina	85,131	2021		
Pernambuco	Caruaru	369,343	2021		
Pernambuco	Garanhuns	141,347	2021		
Pernambuco	Goiana	80,345	2021		
Pernambuco	Gravatá	85,309	2021		
Pernambuco	Igarassu	119,690	2032	Part of the Metropolitan Region of Recife	
Pernambuco	Ipojuca	99,101	2021		
Pernambuco	Jaboatão dos Guararapes	711,330	2021	Part of the Metropolitan Region of Recife	
Pernambuco	Olinda	393,734	2021	Part of the Metropolitan Region of Recife	
Pernambuco	Paulista	336,919	2021	Part of the Metropolitan Region of Recife	
Pernambuco	Petrolina	359,372	2021		
Pernambuco	Recife	1,661,017	2021	Capital	
Pernambuco	Santa Cruz do Capibaribe	111,812	2021		
Pernambuco	São Lourenço da Mata	114,910	2021	Part of the Metropolitan Region of Recife	
Pernambuco	Vitória de Santo Antão	140,389	2021		
Piauí	Parnaíba	153,863	2021		
Piauí	Picos	78,627	2021		
Piauí	Teresina	871,126	2021	Capital	
Rio Grande do Norte	Ceará-Mirim	74,268	2021		
Rio Grande do Norte	Macaíba	82,828	2021		
Rio Grande do Norte	Mossoró	303,792	2021		
Rio Grande do Norte	Natal	896,708	2021		
Rio Grande do Norte	Parnamirim	272,490	2021	Part of the Metropolitan Region of Natal	
Rio Grande do Norte	São Gonçalo do Amarante	104,919	2021	Part of the Metropolitan Region of Natal	
Sergipe	Aracaju	672,614	2021	Capital	
Sergipe	Itabaiana	96,839	2021		
Sergipe	Lagarto	106,015	2021		
Sergipe	Nossa Senhora do Socorro	187,733	2021		
Sergipe	São Cristóvão	92,090	2021		

== Center-West Region ==
State	City	Population	Population year	Notes	Ref
Distrito Federal	Brasília	3,094,325	2021	National capital	
Goiás	Águas Lindas de Goiás	222,850	2021		
Goiás	Anápolis	396,526	2021		
Goiás	Aparecida de Goiânia	601,844	2021		
Goiás	Caldas Novas	95,183	2021		
Goiás	Catalão	113,091	2021		
Goiás	Formosa	125,705	2021		
Goiás	Goiânia	1,555,626	2021	Capital	
Goiás	Itumbiara	106,845	2021		
Goiás	Jataí	103,221	2021		
Goiás	Luziânia	214,645	2021		
Goiás	Novo Gama	119,649	2021		
Goiás	Planaltina	91,345	2021		
Goiás	Rio Verde	247,259	2021		
Goiás	Santo Antônio do Descoberto	76,871	2021		
Goiás	Senador Canedo	121,447	2021		
Goiás	Trindade	132,006	2021		
Goiás	Valparaíso de Goiás	175,720	2021		
Mato Grosso	Cáceres	95,339	2021		
Mato Grosso	Cuiabá	623,614	2021	Capital	
Mato Grosso	Lucas do Rio Verde	69,671	2021		
Mato Grosso	Rondonópolis	239,613	2021		
Mato Grosso	Sinop	148,960	2021		
Mato Grosso	Sorriso	94,941	2021		
Mato Grosso	Tangará da Serra	107,631	2021		
Mato Grosso	Várzea Grande	290,383	2021		
Mato Grosso do Sul	Aquidauana	48,184	2021		
Mato Grosso do Sul	Campo Grande	916,001	2021	Capital	
Mato Grosso do Sul	Corumbá	112,669	2021		
Mato Grosso do Sul	Dourados	227,990	2021		
Mato Grosso do Sul	Maracaju	48,944	2021		
Mato Grosso do Sul	Naviraí	56,484	2021		
Mato Grosso do Sul	Nova Andradina	56,057	2021		
Mato Grosso do Sul	Ponta Porã	95,320	2021		
Mato Grosso do Sul	Sidrolândia	60,792	2021		
Mato Grosso do Sul	Três Lagoas	125,137	2021		

== Southeast Region ==
State	City	Population	Population year	Notes	Ref
Espírito Santo	Aracruz	104,942	2021		
Espírito Santo	Cachoeiro de Itapemirim	212,172	2021		
Espírito Santo	Cariacica	386,495	2021		
Espírito Santo	Colatina	124,283	2021		
Espírito Santo	Guarapari	128,504	2021		
Espírito Santo	Linhares	179,755	2021		
Espírito Santo	São Mateus	134,629	2021		
Espírito Santo	Serra	536,765	2021		
Espírito Santo	Vila Velha	508,655	2021	State's largest	
Espírito Santo	Vitória	369,534	2021	Capital	
Minas Gerais	Alfenas	80,973	2021		
Minas Gerais	Araguari	118,361	2021		
Minas Gerais	Araxá	108,403	2021		
Minas Gerais	Barbacena	139,061	2021		
Minas Gerais	Belo Horizonte	2,530,701	2021	Capital	
Minas Gerais	Betim	450,024	2021		
Minas Gerais	Caratinga	93,124	2021		
Minas Gerais	Conselheiro Lafaiete	130,584	2021		
Minas Gerais	Coronel Fabriciano	110,709	2021		
Minas Gerais	Contagem	673,849	2021		
Minas Gerais	Curvelo	81,085	2021		
Minas Gerais	Divinópolis	242,505	2021		
Minas Gerais	Governador Valadares	282,164	2021		
Minas Gerais	Ibirité	184,030	2021		
Minas Gerais	Ipatinga	267,333	2021		
Minas Gerais	Itabira	121,717	2021		
Minas Gerais	Itajubá	97,782	2021		
Minas Gerais	Itaúna	94,455	2021		
Minas Gerais	Ituiutaba	105,818	2021		
Minas Gerais	Juiz de Fora	577,532	2021		
Minas Gerais	Lavras	105,756	2021		
Minas Gerais	Manhuaçu	92,074	2021		
Minas Gerais	Montes Claros	417,478	2021		
Minas Gerais	Muriaé	109,997	2021		
Minas Gerais	Nova Lima	97,378	2021		
Minas Gerais	Nova Serrana	108,241	2021		
Minas Gerais	Paracatu	94,539	2021		
Minas Gerais	Pará de Minas	95,616	2021		
Minas Gerais	Passos	115,970	2021		
Minas Gerais	Patos de Minas	154,641	2021		
Minas Gerais	Patrocínio	92,116	2021		
Minas Gerais	Poços de Caldas	169,838	2021		
Minas Gerais	Pouso Alegre	154,293	2021		
Minas Gerais	Ribeirão das Neves	341,415	2021		
Minas Gerais	Sabará	137,877	2021		
Minas Gerais	Santa Luzia	221,705	2021		
Minas Gerais	São João del-Rei	90,897	2021		
Minas Gerais	Sete Lagoas	243,950	2021		
Minas Gerais	Teófilo Otoni	141,269	2021		
Minas Gerais	Timóteo	91,268	2021		
Minas Gerais	Ubá	117,995	2021		
Minas Gerais	Uberaba	340,277	2021		
Minas Gerais	Uberlândia	706,597	2021		
Minas Gerais	Varginha	137,608	2021		
Minas Gerais	Vespasiano	131,849	2021		
Rio de Janeiro	Angra dos Reis	210,171	2021		
Rio de Janeiro	Araruama	136,109	2021		
Rio de Janeiro	Barra do Piraí	101,139	2021		
Rio de Janeiro	Barra Mansa	185,237	2021		
Rio de Janeiro	Belford Roxo	515,239	2021		
Rio de Janeiro	Cabo Frio	234,077	2021		
Rio de Janeiro	Campos dos Goytacazes	514,643	2021		
Rio de Janeiro	Duque de Caxias	929,449	2021		
Rio de Janeiro	Itaboraí	244,416	2021		
Rio de Janeiro	Itaguaí	136,547	2021		
Rio de Janeiro	Itaperuna	104,354	2021		
Rio de Janeiro	Japeri	106,296	2021		
Rio de Janeiro	Macaé	266,136	2021		
Rio de Janeiro	Magé	247,741	2021		
Rio de Janeiro	Maricá	167,668	2021		
Rio de Janeiro	Mesquita	177,016	2021		
Rio de Janeiro	Nilópolis	162,893	2021		
Rio de Janeiro	Niterói	516,981	2021		
Rio de Janeiro	Nova Friburgo	191,664	2021		
Rio de Janeiro	Nova Iguaçu	825,388	2021		
Rio de Janeiro	Petrópolis	307,144	2021		
Rio de Janeiro	Queimados	152,311	2021		
Rio de Janeiro	Resende	133,244	2021		
Rio de Janeiro	Rio das Ostras	159,529	2021		
Rio de Janeiro	Rio de Janeiro	6,775,561	2021	Capital	
Rio de Janeiro	São Gonçalo	1,098,357	2021		
Rio de Janeiro	São João de Meriti	473,385	2021		
Rio de Janeiro	São Pedro da Aldeia	107,556	2021		
Rio de Janeiro	Teresópolis	185,820	2021		
Rio de Janeiro	Volta Redonda	274,925	2021		
São Paulo	Americana	244,370	2021		
São Paulo	Araçatuba	199,210	2021		
São Paulo	Araraquara	240,542	2021		
São Paulo	Araras	136,739	2021		
São Paulo	Assis	105,768	2021		
São Paulo	Atibaia	145,378	2021		
São Paulo	Barretos	123,546	2021		
São Paulo	Barueri	279,704	2021		
São Paulo	Bauru	381,706	2021		
São Paulo	Birigui	126,094	2021		
São Paulo	Botucatu	149,718	2021		
São Paulo	Bragança Paulista	172,346	2021		
São Paulo	Caieiras	104,044	2021		
São Paulo	Campinas	1,223,237	2021		
São Paulo	Caraguatatuba	125,194	2021		
São Paulo	Carapicuíba	405,375	2021		
São Paulo	Catanduva	123,114	2021		
São Paulo	Cotia	257,882	2021		
São Paulo	Cubatão	132,521	2021		
São Paulo	Diadema	429,550	2021		
São Paulo	Embu das Artes	279,264	2021		
São Paulo	Ferraz de Vasconcelos	198,661	2021		
São Paulo	Franca	358,539	2021		
São Paulo	Francisco Morato	179,372	2021		
São Paulo	Franco da Rocha	158,438	2021		
São Paulo	Guaratinguetá	123,192	2021		
São Paulo	Guarujá	324,977	2021		
São Paulo	Guarulhos	1,404,694	2021		
São Paulo	Hortolândia	237,570	2021		
São Paulo	Indaiatuba	260,690	2021		
São Paulo	Itanhaém	104,351	2021		
São Paulo	Itapecerica da Serra	179,574	2021		
São Paulo	Itapetininga	167,106	2021		
São Paulo	Itapevi	244,131	2021		
São Paulo	Itaquaquecetuba	379,082	2021		
São Paulo	Itatiba	124,254	2021		
São Paulo	Itu	177,150	2021		
São Paulo	Jacareí	237,119	2021		
São Paulo	Jandira	127,734	2021		
São Paulo	Jaú	153,463	2021		
São Paulo	Jundiaí	436,935	2021		
São Paulo	Leme	105,273	2021		
São Paulo	Limeira	310,783	2021		
São Paulo	Mairiporã	103,645	2021		
São Paulo	Marília	242,249	2021		
São Paulo	Mauá	481,725	2021		
São Paulo	Mogi das Cruzes	455,587	2021		
São Paulo	Mogi Guaçu	154,146	2021		
São Paulo	Osasco	701,428	2021		
São Paulo	Ourinhos	115,139	2021		
São Paulo	Paulínia	114,508	2021		
São Paulo	Pindamonhangaba	171,885	2021		
São Paulo	Piracicaba	410,275	2021		
São Paulo	Poá	119,221	2021		
São Paulo	Praia Grande	336,454	2021		
São Paulo	Presidente Prudente	231,953	2021		
São Paulo	Ribeirão Pires	125,238	2021		
São Paulo	Ribeirão Preto	720,116	2021		
São Paulo	Rio Claro	209,548	2021		
São Paulo	Salto	120,779	2021		
São Paulo	Santa Bárbara d'Oeste	195,278	2021		
São Paulo	Santana de Parnaíba	145,073	2021		
São Paulo	Santo André	723,889	2021		
São Paulo	Santos	443,991	2021		
São Paulo	São Bernardo do Campo	849,874	2021		
São Paulo	São Caetano do Sul	162,763	2021		
São Paulo	São Carlos	256,915	2021		
São Paulo	São José do Rio Preto	469,173	2021		
São Paulo	São José dos Campos	737,310	2021		
São Paulo	São Paulo	12,396,372	2021	Capital	
São Paulo	São Vicente	370,839	2021		
São Paulo	Sertãozinho	128,432	2021		
São Paulo	Sorocaba	695,328	2021		
São Paulo	Sumaré	289,875	2021		
São Paulo	Suzano	303,397	2021		
São Paulo	Taboão da Serra	297,528	2021		
São Paulo	Tatuí	124,134	2021		
São Paulo	Taubaté	320,820	2021		
São Paulo	Valinhos	133,169	2021		
São Paulo	Várzea Paulista	124,269	2021		
São Paulo	Votorantim	124,468	2021		

== South Region ==
State	City	Population	Population year	Notes	Ref
Paraná	Almirante Tamandaré	121,420	2021		
Paraná	Apucarana	137,438	2021		
Paraná	Arapongas	126,545	2021		
Paraná	Araucária	148,522	2021		
Paraná	Cambé	108,126	2021		
Paraná	Campo Largo	135,678	2021		
Paraná	Cascavel	336,073	2021		
Paraná	Colombo	249,277	2021		
Paraná	Curitiba	1,963,726	2021	Capital	
Paraná	Fazenda Rio Grande	103,750	2021		
Paraná	Foz do Iguaçu	257,971	2021		
Paraná	Guarapuava	183,755	2021		
Paraná	Londrina	580,870	2021		
Paraná	Maringá	436,472	2021		
Paraná	Paranaguá	157,378	2021		
Paraná	Pinhais	134,788	2021		
Paraná	Piraquara	116,852	2021		
Paraná	Ponta Grossa	358,838	2021		
Paraná	São José dos Pinhais	334,620	2021		
Paraná	Toledo	144,601	2021		
Paraná	Umuarama	113,416	2021		
Santa Catarina	Balneário Camboriú	149,227	2021		
Santa Catarina	Blumenau	366,418	2021		
Santa Catarina	Brusque	140,597	2021		
Santa Catarina	Chapecó	227,587	2021		
Santa Catarina	Criciúma	219,393	2021		
Santa Catarina	Florianópolis	516,524	2021	Capital	
Santa Catarina	Itajaí	226,617	2021		
Santa Catarina	Jaraguá do Sul	184,579	2021		
Santa Catarina	Joinville	604,708	2021	State's largest	
Santa Catarina	Lages	157,158	2021		
Santa Catarina	Palhoça	178,679	2021		
Santa Catarina	São José	253,705	2021		
Santa Catarina	Tubarão	107,143	2021		
Rio Grande do Sul	Alvorada	212,352	2021		
Rio Grande do Sul	Bagé	121,518	2021		
Rio Grande do Sul	Bento Gonçalves	123,090	2021		
Rio Grande do Sul	Cachoeirinha	132,144	2021		
Rio Grande do Sul	Canoas	349,728	2021		
Rio Grande do Sul	Caxias do Sul	523,716	2021		
Rio Grande do Sul	Erechim	107,368	2021		
Rio Grande do Sul	Gravataí	285,564	2021		
Rio Grande do Sul	Novo Hamburgo	247,303	2021		
Rio Grande do Sul	Passo Fundo	206,103	2021		
Rio Grande do Sul	Pelotas	343,826	2021		
Rio Grande do Sul	Porto Alegre	1,492,530	2021	Capital	
Rio Grande do Sul	Rio Grande	212,881	2021		
Rio Grande do Sul	Santa Cruz do Sul	132,271	2021		
Rio Grande do Sul	Santa Maria	285,159	2021		
Rio Grande do Sul	São Leopoldo	240,378	2021		
Rio Grande do Sul	Sapucaia do Sul	142,508	2021		
Rio Grande do Sul	Uruguaiana	126,766	2021		
Rio Grande do Sul	Viamão	257,330	2021		

== See also ==
- List of cities in Brazil
- Largest metropolitan areas in the Americas
- Brazilian Institute of Geography and Statistics
