= List of municipalities in Brazil by population =

Population distribution in Brazil in 2022

Brazil has a high level of urbanization with 87.8% of the population residing in urban and metropolitan areas. The criteria used by the IBGE (Brazilian Institute of Geography and Statistics) in determining whether households are urban or rural, however, are based on political divisions, not on the developed environment. Its most populous city is São Paulo.

The country currently has 5,571 cities, with 5,569 municipalities plus the capital (Brasília) and the Island of Fernando de Noronha.With two exceptions, the state capitals are all the largest cities in their respective states: Florianópolis, the capital of Santa Catarina is its second-largest city after Joinville, while Vitória is only the fourth-largest city in Espírito Santo, although it is located in that state's largest metropolitan area.

== Most populous cities in Brazil ==
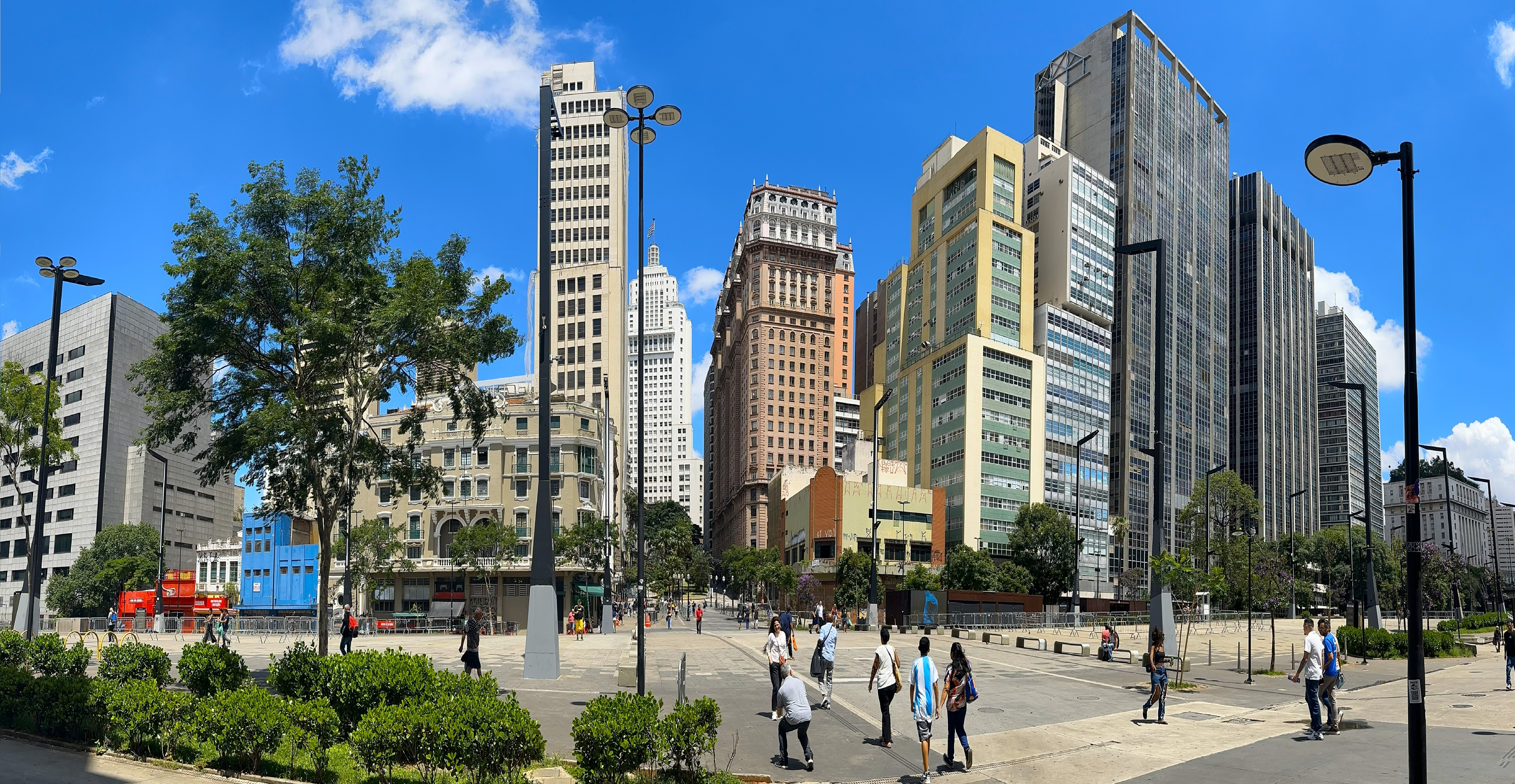
São Paulo, the largest city in South America, largest city in the Western Hemisphere, and the second most populous city outside Asia

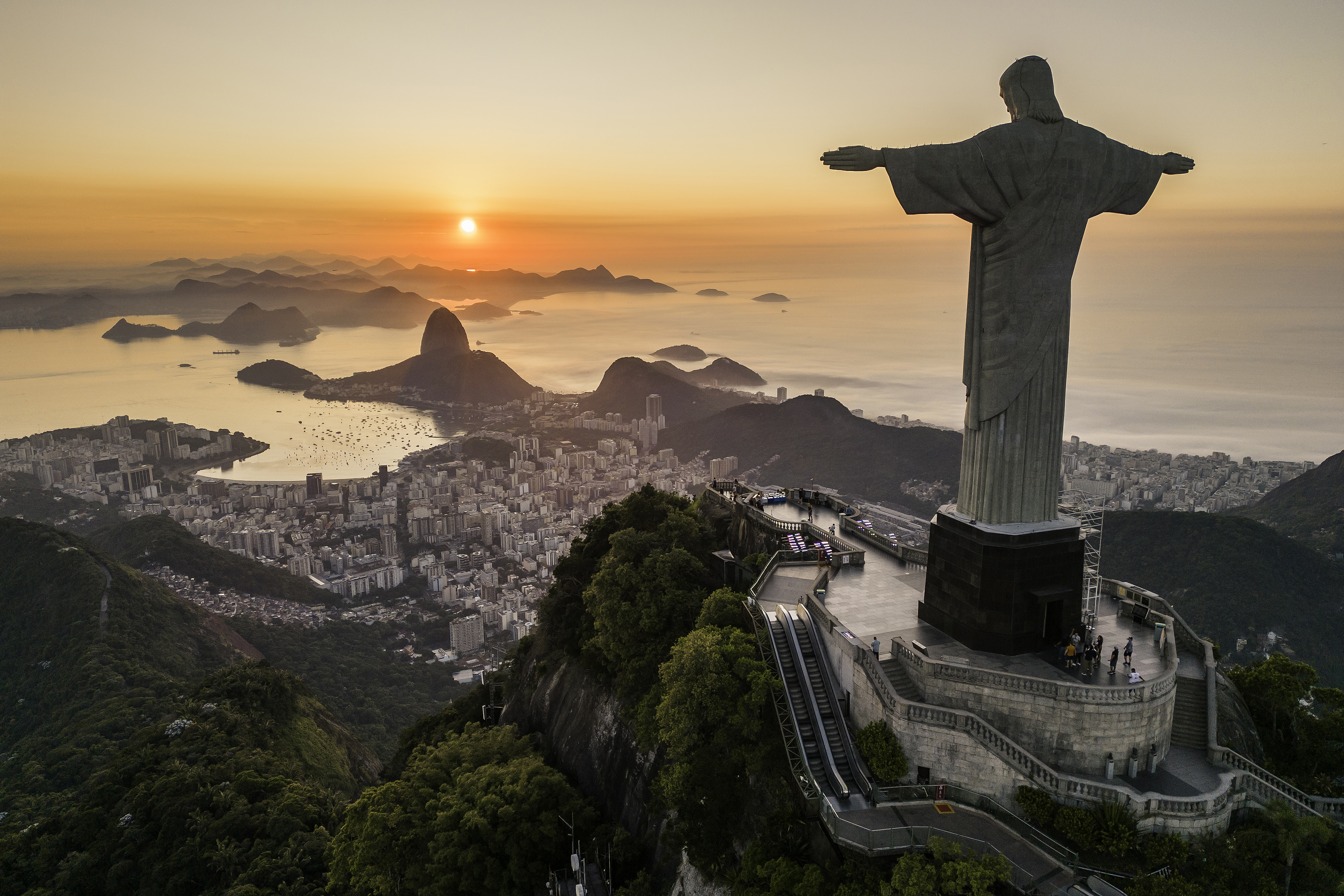
Rio de Janeiro, the second most populous city in Brazil

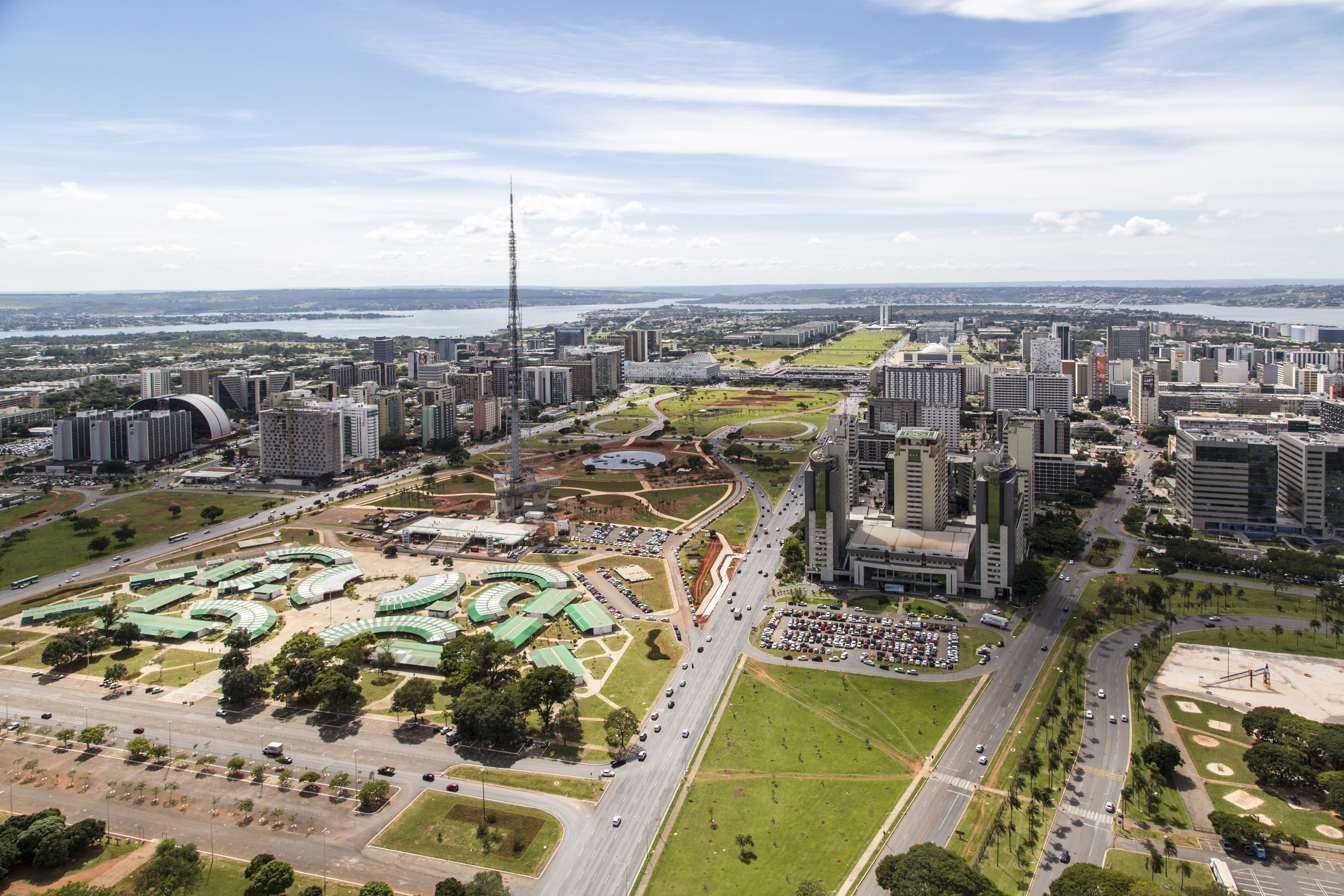
Brasília, the third most populous city and capital of Brazil

This is a list of the most populous cities based on the population of the municipality where the city is located, rather than its metropolitan area. As IBGE considers the entire Federal District synonymous to Brasília, the population of the Federal District is shown for Brasília.

The table displays:

- The municipality rank by population as of 1 July 2025, as estimated of Brazilian Institute of Geography and Statistics (IBGE)
- The municipality name
- The name of the state in which the municipality lies
- The municipality population as of 1 July 2025, as estimated by the Brazilian Institute of Geography and Statistics
- The municipality population as of 1 August 2022, as enumerated by the Brazilian Institute of Geography and Statistics
- The municipality percent population change from 1 August 2022, to 1 July 2025

State capital
State's largest city
State capital and largest city
Federal capital

Municipality	State	2025 estimate	2022 census	Change
São Paulo	São Paulo	11,904,961	11,451,999	+3.96%
Rio de Janeiro	Rio de Janeiro	6,730,729	6,211,223	+8.36%
Brasília	Distrito Federal	2,996,899	2,817,381	+6.37%
Fortaleza	Ceará	2,578,483	2,428,708	+6.17%
Salvador	Bahia	2,564,204	2,417,678	+6.06%
Belo Horizonte	Minas Gerais	2,415,872	2,315,560	+4.33%
Manaus	Amazonas	2,303,732	2,063,689	+11.63%
Curitiba	Paraná	1,830,795	1,773,718	+3.22%
Recife	Pernambuco	1,588,376	1,488,920	+6.68%
Goiânia	Goiás	1,503,256	1,437,366	+4.58%
Belém	Pará	1,397,315	1,303,403	+7.21%
Porto Alegre	Rio Grande do Sul	1,388,794	1,332,845	+4.20%
Guarulhos	São Paulo	1,349,100	1,291,771	+4.44%
Campinas	São Paulo	1,187,974	1,139,047	+4.30%
São Luís	Maranhão	1,089,215	1,037,775	+4.96%
Maceió	Alagoas	994,952	957,916	+3.87%
Campo Grande	Mato Grosso do Sul	962,883	898,100	+7.21%
São Gonçalo	Rio de Janeiro	960,196	896,744	+7.08%
Teresina	Piauí	905,692	866,300	+4.55%
João Pessoa	Paraíba	897,633	833,932	+7.64%
Duque de Caxias	Rio de Janeiro	866,225	808,161	+7.18%
Nova Iguaçu	Rio de Janeiro	843,220	785,867	+7.30%
São Bernardo do Campo	São Paulo	841,154	810,729	+3.75%
Natal	Rio Grande do Norte	784,249	751,300	+4.39%
Santo André	São Paulo	782,048	748,919	+4.42%
Sorocaba	São Paulo	762,172	723,682	+5.32%
Uberlândia	Minas Gerais	761,835	713,224	+6.82%
Osasco	São Paulo	759,524	728,615	+4.24%
Ribeirão Preto	São Paulo	731,639	698,642	+4.72%
São José dos Campos	São Paulo	727,078	697,054	+4.31%
Cuiabá	Mato Grosso	691,875	650,877	+6.30%
Jaboatão dos Guararapes	Pernambuco	684,293	644,037	+6.25%
Joinville	Santa Catarina	664,541	616,317	+7.82%
Feira de Santana	Bahia	660,806	616,272	+7.23%
Contagem	Minas Gerais	651,718	621,863	+4.80%
Aracaju	Sergipe	630,932	602,757	+4.67%
Florianópolis	Santa Catarina	587,486	537,211	+9.36%
Londrina	Paraná	581,382	555,965	+4.57%
Serra	Espírito Santo	579,720	520,653	+11.34%
Juiz de Fora	Minas Gerais	567,730	540,756	+4.99%
Aparecida de Goiânia	Goiás	556,021	527,796	+5.35%
Campos dos Goytacazes	Rio de Janeiro	519,259	483,540	+7.39%
Belford Roxo	Rio de Janeiro	518,384	483,087	+7.31%
Porto Velho	Rondônia	517,709	460,434	+12.44%
Niterói	Rio de Janeiro	516,787	481,749	+7.27%
Ananindeua	Pará	509,227	478,778	+6.36%
Vila Velha	Espírito Santo	506,779	467,722	+8.35%
São José do Rio Preto	São Paulo	504,166	480,393	+4.95%
Macapá	Amapá	489,676	442,933	+10.55%
Boa Vista	Roraima	485,477	413,486	+17.41%
Caxias do Sul	Rio Grande do Sul	479,599	463,501	+3.47%
Mogi das Cruzes	São Paulo	470,302	451,505	+4.16%
São João de Meriti	Rio de Janeiro	466,503	440,962	+5.79%
Jundiaí	São Paulo	463,039	443,221	+4.47%
Campina Grande	Paraíba	443,911	419,379	+5.85%
Piracicaba	São Paulo	440,835	423,323	+4.14%
Montes Claros	Minas Gerais	437,601	414,240	+5.64%
Betim	Minas Gerais	431,433	411,846	+4.76%
Maringá	Paraná	429,660	409,657	+4.88%
Santos	São Paulo	429,547	418,608	+2.61%
Mauá	São Paulo	429,014	418,261	+2.57%
Anápolis	Goiás	420,300	398,869	+5.37%
Petrolina	Pernambuco	418,444	386,791	+8.18%
Caruaru	Pernambuco	405,408	378,048	+7.24%
Diadema	São Paulo	403,579	393,237	+2.63%
Carapicuíba	São Paulo	398,236	386,984	+2.91%
Vitória da Conquista	Bahia	396,613	370,879	+6.94%
Bauru	São Paulo	392,947	379,146	+3.64%
Rio Branco	Acre	389,001	364,756	+6.65%
Blumenau	Santa Catarina	385,558	361,261	+6.73%
Itaquaquecetuba	São Paulo	382,983	369,275	+3.71%
Caucaia	Ceará	378,406	355,679	+6.39%
Cariacica	Espírito Santo	376,200	353,491	+6.42%
Ponta Grossa	Paraná	375,632	358,371	+4.82%
Praia Grande	São Paulo	368,539	349,935	+5.32%
Cascavel	Paraná	368,195	348,051	+5.79%
Franca	São Paulo	365,494	352,536	+3.68%
Paulista	Pernambuco	365,144	342,167	+6.72%
Olinda	Pernambuco	364,717	349,976	+4.21%
Santarém	Pará	360,871	331,942	+8.72%
Canoas	Rio Grande do Sul	359,840	347,657	+3.50%
Uberaba	Minas Gerais	356,781	337,836	+5.61%
São José dos Pinhais	Paraná	349,880	329,628	+6.14%
Ribeirão das Neves	Minas Gerais	346,971	329,794	+5.21%
Vitória	Espírito Santo	343,378	322,869	+6.35%
São Vicente	São Paulo	338,326	329,911	+2.55%
Pelotas	Rio Grande do Sul	336,150	325,685	+3.21%
Barueri	São Paulo	333,737	316,473	+5.46%
Palmas	Tocantins	328,499	302,692	+8.53%
Taubaté	São Paulo	322,397	310,739	+3.75%
Camaçari	Bahia	321,636	300,372	+7.08%
Suzano	São Paulo	320,261	307,429	+4.17%
Várzea Grande	Mato Grosso	318,922	300,078	+6.28%
Parauapebas	Pará	305,771	267,836	+14.16%
Juazeiro do Norte	Ceará	305,531	286,120	+6.78%
Limeira	São Paulo	301,292	291,869	+3.23%
Foz do Iguaçu	Paraná	297,352	285,415	+4.18%
São José	Santa Catarina	295,658	270,299	+9.38%
Petrópolis	Rio de Janeiro	294,926	278,881	+5.75%
Guarujá	São Paulo	294,871	287,634	+2.52%
Itajaí	Santa Catarina	294,850	264,054	+11.66%
Sumaré	São Paulo	291,116	279,545	+4.14%
Marabá	Pará	290,975	266,533	+9.17%
Cotia	São Paulo	289,493	274,413	+5.50%
Imperatriz	Maranhão	285,806	273,110	+4.65%
Taboão da Serra	São Paulo	285,307	273,542	+4.30%
Chapecó	Santa Catarina	282,648	254,785	+10.94%
Santa Maria	Rio Grande do Sul	282,395	271,735	+3.92%
Volta Redonda	Rio de Janeiro	279,971	261,563	+7.04%
Mossoró	Rio Grande do Norte	278,587	264,577	+5.30%
Gravataí	Rio Grande do Sul	275,430	265,074	+3.91%
Parnamirim	Rio Grande do Norte	271,713	252,716	+7.52%
Indaiatuba	São Paulo	269,657	255,748	+5.44%
Governador Valadares	Minas Gerais	266,561	257,171	+3.65%
São Carlos	São Paulo	266,427	254,857	+4.54%
Macaé	Rio de Janeiro	264,439	246,391	+7.32%
Dourados	Mato Grosso do Sul	264,017	243,367	+8.49%
Rondonópolis	Mato Grosso	263,708	244,911	+7.68%
Embu das Artes	São Paulo	259,788	250,691	+3.63%
São José de Ribamar	Maranhão	259,164	244,579	+5.96%
Juazeiro	Bahia	256,122	237,821	+7.70%
Araraquara	São Paulo	253,474	242,228	+4.64%
Palhoça	Santa Catarina	253,469	222,598	+13.87%
Maracanaú	Ceará	251,613	234,509	+7.29%
Jacareí	São Paulo	250,952	240,275	+4.44%
Hortolândia	São Paulo	248,842	236,641	+5.16%
Americana	São Paulo	247,571	237,240	+4.35%
Marília	São Paulo	247,348	237,627	+4.09%
Águas Lindas de Goiás	Goiás	245,352	225,693	+8.71%
Magé	Rio de Janeiro	244,142	228,127	+7.02%
Arapiraca	Alagoas	243,906	234,696	+3.92%
Divinópolis	Minas Gerais	243,583	231,091	+5.41%
Itapevi	São Paulo	242,995	232,297	+4.61%
Colombo	Paraná	241,672	232,212	+4.07%
Rio Verde	Goiás	241,494	225,696	+7.00%
Itaboraí	Rio de Janeiro	240,127	224,267	+7.07%
Sete Lagoas	Minas Gerais	238,909	227,397	+5.06%
Cabo Frio	Rio de Janeiro	238,438	222,161	+7.33%
Novo Hamburgo	Rio Grande do Sul	235,802	227,646	+3.58%
Ipatinga	Minas Gerais	235,311	227,731	+3.33%
Presidente Prudente	São Paulo	234,706	225,668	+4.00%
Viamão	Rio Grande do Sul	231,996	224,112	+3.52%
Santa Luzia	Minas Gerais	230,382	219,132	+5.13%
Criciúma	Santa Catarina	227,438	214,493	+6.04%
São Leopoldo	Rio Grande do Sul	225,737	217,409	+3.83%
Sinop	Mato Grosso	223,780	196,312	+13.99%
Luziânia	Goiás	221,262	209,129	+5.80%
Lauro de Freitas	Bahia	219,564	203,331	+7.98%
Valparaíso de Goiás	Goiás	218,416	198,861	+9.83%
Cabo de Santo Agostinho	Pernambuco	218,049	203,440	+7.18%
Sobral	Ceará	216,519	203,023	+6.65%
Passo Fundo	Rio Grande do Sul	214,811	206,215	+4.17%
Maricá	Rio de Janeiro	212,470	197,277	+7.70%
Rio Claro	São Paulo	210,323	201,418	+4.42%
Castanhal	Pará	209,126	192,256	+8.77%
Araçatuba	São Paulo	208,415	200,124	+4.14%
Nossa Senhora do Socorro	Sergipe	204,081	192,330	+6.11%
Nova Friburgo	Rio de Janeiro	203,417	189,939	+7.10%
Jaraguá do Sul	Santa Catarina	199,519	182,660	+9.23%
Rio Grande	Rio Grande do Sul	198,935	191,900	+3.67%
Cachoeiro de Itapemirim	Espírito Santo	198,342	185,786	+6.76%
Itabuna	Bahia	196,344	186,708	+5.16%
Alvorada	Rio Grande do Sul	194,062	187,315	+3.60%
Guarapuava	Paraná	189,630	182,093	+4.14%
Santa Bárbara d'Oeste	São Paulo	189,456	183,347	+3.33%
Ilhéus	Bahia	189,149	178,649	+5.88%
Ferraz de Vasconcelos	São Paulo	186,479	179,198	+4.06%
Bragança Paulista	São Paulo	185,688	176,811	+5.02%
Linhares	Espírito Santo	183,797	166,786	+10.20%
Araguaína	Tocantins	183,024	171,301	+6.84%
Timon	Maranhão	182,711	174,465	+4.73%
Porto Seguro	Bahia	182,630	168,326	+8.50%
Barra Mansa	Rio de Janeiro	181,679	169,894	+6.94%
Ibirité	Minas Gerais	179,582	170,537	+5.30%
Angra dos Reis	Rio de Janeiro	179,142	167,434	+6.99%
Mesquita	Rio de Janeiro	178,830	167,127	+7.00%
Teresópolis	Rio de Janeiro	176,735	165,123	+7.03%
Itu	São Paulo	175,047	168,240	+4.05%
Senador Canedo	Goiás	175,042	155,635	+12.47%
São Caetano do Sul	São Paulo	172,693	165,655	+4.25%
Pindamonhangaba	São Paulo	172,681	165,428	+4.38%
Lages	Santa Catarina	172,458	164,981	+4.53%
Abaetetuba	Pará	172,344	158,188	+8.95%
Poços de Caldas	Minas Gerais	172,339	163,742	+5.25%
Barreiras	Bahia	171,634	159,734	+7.45%
Francisco Morato	São Paulo	171,476	165,139	+3.84%
Parnaíba	Piauí	170,491	162,159	+5.14%
Jequié	Bahia	169,201	158,813	+6.54%
Patos de Minas	Minas Gerais	169,173	159,235	+6.24%
Rio das Ostras	Rio de Janeiro	168,455	156,491	+7.65%
Atibaia	São Paulo	167,161	158,647	+5.37%
Fazenda Rio Grande	Paraná	165,943	148,873	+11.47%
Itapetininga	São Paulo	164,256	157,790	+4.10%
Santana de Parnaíba	São Paulo	163,787	154,105	+6.28%
Caxias	Maranhão	163,546	156,973	+4.19%
Itapecerica da Serra	São Paulo	163,003	158,522	+2.83%
Araucária	Paraná	162,247	151,666	+6.98%
Pouso Alegre	Minas Gerais	162,133	152,217	+6.51%
Alagoinhas	Bahia	161,196	151,055	+6.71%
Santa Rita	Paraíba	160,852	149,910	+7.30%
Toledo	Paraná	160,701	150,470	+6.80%
Mogi Guaçu	São Paulo	160,318	153,658	+4.33%
Camaragibe	Pernambuco	156,112	147,771	+5.64%
Nilópolis	Rio de Janeiro	155,500	146,774	+5.95%
Brusque	Santa Catarina	155,307	141,385	+9.85%
Teixeira de Freitas	Bahia	153,738	145,216	+5.87%
Trindade	Goiás	153,560	142,431	+7.81%
Paço do Lumiar	Maranhão	153,158	145,643	+5.16%
Garanhuns	Pernambuco	151,803	142,506	+6.52%
Balneário Camboriú	Santa Catarina	151,674	139,155	+9.00%
Botucatu	São Paulo	151,053	145,155	+4.06%
Franco da Rocha	São Paulo	150,241	144,849	+3.72%
Paranaguá	Paraná	150,104	145,829	+2.93%
Queimados	Rio de Janeiro	149,135	140,523	+6.13%
Cametá	Pará	144,859	134,184	+7.96%
Campo Largo	Paraná	144,504	136,327	+6.00%
Vitória de Santo Antão	Pernambuco	144,243	134,084	+7.58%
Varginha	Minas Gerais	143,676	136,467	+5.28%
Três Lagoas	Mato Grosso do Sul	143,523	132,152	+8.60%
Teófilo Otoni	Minas Gerais	142,851	137,418	+3.95%
Caraguatatuba	São Paulo	142,248	134,873	+5.47%
Cachoeirinha	Rio Grande do Sul	141,503	136,258	+3.85%
Salto	São Paulo	141,111	134,319	+5.06%
Ji-Paraná	Rondônia	140,101	124,333	+12.68%
Barcarena	Pará	139,076	126,650	+9.81%
Crato	Ceará	139,027	131,050	+6.09%
Itapipoca	Ceará	138,978	131,123	+5.99%
Conselheiro Lafaiete	Minas Gerais	138,946	131,621	+5.57%
Altamira	Pará	138,749	126,279	+9.87%
Vespasiano	Minas Gerais	138,583	129,246	+7.22%
Santa Cruz do Sul	Rio Grande do Sul	138,270	133,230	+3.78%
Araruama	Rio de Janeiro	137,906	129,671	+6.35%
Resende	Rio de Janeiro	137,697	129,612	+6.24%
Jaú	São Paulo	137,409	133,497	+2.93%
Sapucaia do Sul	Rio Grande do Sul	136,572	132,107	+3.38%
Guarapari	Espírito Santo	136,311	124,656	+9.35%
Araras	São Paulo	135,744	130,866	+3.73%
Itaituba	Pará	135,369	123,314	+9.78%
Apucarana	Paraná	134,910	130,134	+3.67%
Sabará	Minas Gerais	134,576	129,380	+4.02%
São Mateus	Espírito Santo	134,423	123,752	+8.62%
Votorantim	São Paulo	133,510	127,923	+4.37%
Bragança	Pará	132,489	123,082	+7.64%
Valinhos	São Paulo	132,258	126,373	+4.66%
Sertãozinho	São Paulo	132,176	126,887	+4.17%
Pinhais	Paraná	131,255	127,019	+3.33%
Barbacena	Minas Gerais	129,695	125,317	+3.49%
Colatina	Espírito Santo	129,301	120,033	+7.72%
Tatuí	São Paulo	129,130	123,942	+4.19%
Sarandi	Paraná	128,106	118,455	+8.15%
Bento Gonçalves	Rio Grande do Sul	127,977	123,151	+3.92%
Piraquara	Paraná	127,433	118,730	+7.33%
Itatiba	São Paulo	127,112	121,590	+4.54%
Barretos	São Paulo	126,957	122,485	+3.65%
Almirante Tamandaré	Paraná	125,861	119,825	+5.04%
Arapongas	Paraná	124,838	119,138	+4.78%
Sorriso	Mato Grosso	124,665	110,635	+12.68%
São Gonçalo do Amarante	Rio Grande do Norte	124,495	115,838	+7.47%
Itaguaí	Rio de Janeiro	124,021	116,841	+6.15%
Araguari	Minas Gerais	123,432	117,808	+4.77%
Birigui	São Paulo	123,340	118,979	+3.67%
Umuarama	Paraná	123,059	117,095	+5.09%
Igarassu	Pernambuco	123,017	115,196	+6.79%
Catalão	Goiás	122,760	114,427	+7.28%
Bagé	Rio Grande do Sul	121,928	117,938	+3.38%
Guaratinguetá	São Paulo	121,916	118,044	+3.28%
Formosa	Goiás	121,559	115,901	+4.88%
Jandira	São Paulo	121,550	118,045	+2.97%
Eunápolis	Bahia	121,067	113,710	+6.47%
Nova Lima	Minas Gerais	120,959	111,697	+8.29%
Uruguaiana	Rio Grande do Sul	120,819	117,210	+3.08%
Simões Filho	Bahia	120,419	114,559	+5.12%
Várzea Paulista	São Paulo	119,655	115,771	+3.35%
Marituba	Pará	119,437	111,785	+6.85%
Paulo Afonso	Bahia	119,418	112,870	+5.80%
Catanduva	São Paulo	119,275	115,791	+3.01%
Ribeirão Pires	São Paulo	118,954	115,559	+2.94%
Santana	Amapá	118,803	107,618	+10.39%
Araxá	Minas Gerais	118,786	111,691	+6.35%
Itanhaém	São Paulo	118,495	112,476	+5.35%
Luís Eduardo Magalhães	Bahia	118,382	107,909	+9.71%
Codó	Maranhão	118,283	114,275	+3.51%
São Lourenço da Mata	Pernambuco	118,258	111,249	+6.30%
Itabira	Minas Gerais	118,053	113,343	+4.16%
Camboriú	Santa Catarina	117,324	103,074	+13.83%
Passos	Minas Gerais	116,951	111,939	+4.48%
Tubarão	Santa Catarina	116,725	110,088	+6.03%
Paulínia	São Paulo	116,674	110,537	+5.55%
Breves	Pará	116,058	106,968	+8.50%
Cubatão	São Paulo	114,870	112,476	+2.13%
Nova Serrana	Minas Gerais	114,791	105,552	+8.75%
Tangará da Serra	Mato Grosso	114,603	106,434	+7.68%
Itacoatiara	Amazonas	113,917	103,598	+9.96%
Paragominas	Pará	113,498	105,550	+7.53%
Itumbiara	Goiás	113,322	107,970	+4.96%
Planaltina	Goiás	112,304	105,031	+6.92%
Manacapuru	Amazonas	111,751	101,883	+9.69%
Jataí	Goiás	111,634	105,729	+5.59%
Cambé	Paraná	110,923	107,208	+3.47%
Lavras	Minas Gerais	110,682	104,761	+5.65%
São Pedro da Aldeia	Rio de Janeiro	110,677	104,029	+6.39%
Açailândia	Maranhão	110,611	106,550	+3.81%
Santo Antônio de Jesus	Bahia	109,791	103,055	+6.54%
Vilhena	Rondônia	109,651	95,832	+14.42%
Erechim	Rio Grande do Sul	109,609	105,705	+3.69%
Itabaiana	Sergipe	109,250	103,440	+5.62%
Ariquemes	Rondônia	109,170	96,833	+12.74%
Coronel Fabriciano	Minas Gerais	108,708	104,736	+3.79%
Maranguape	Ceará	108,622	105,093	+3.36%
Muriaé	Minas Gerais	108,447	104,108	+4.17%
Patos	Paraíba	108,104	103,165	+4.79%
Bacabal	Maranhão	107,755	103,711	+3.90%
Novo Gama	Goiás	107,663	103,804	+3.72%
Ubá	Minas Gerais	107,423	103,365	+3.93%
Itaperuna	Rio de Janeiro	107,297	101,041	+6.19%
Ourinhos	São Paulo	106,911	103,970	+2.83%
Caldas Novas	Goiás	106,820	98,622	+8.31%
Ituiutaba	Minas Gerais	106,775	102,217	+4.46%
Ipojuca	Pernambuco	106,539	98,932	+7.69%
Poá	São Paulo	106,355	103,765	+2.50%
Balsas	Maranhão	105,974	101,767	+4.13%
Lagarto	Sergipe	105,957	101,579	+4.31%
Assis	São Paulo	104,858	101,409	+3.40%
Santa Cruz do Capibaribe	Pernambuco	104,854	98,254	+6.72%
Abreu e Lima	Pernambuco	104,248	98,462	+5.88%
Campo Mourão	Paraná	104,122	99,432	+4.72%
Aracruz	Espírito Santo	103,363	94,765	+9.07%
Itaúna	Minas Gerais	103,272	97,669	+5.74%
Pará de Minas	Minas Gerais	102,844	97,139	+5.87%
Iguatu	Ceará	102,588	98,064	+4.61%
Francisco Beltrão	Paraná	102,312	96,666	+5.84%
Japeri	Rio de Janeiro	102,171	96,289	+6.11%
Parintins	Amazonas	101,855	96,372	+5.69%
Cidade Ocidental	Goiás	101,570	91,767	+10.68%
Leme	São Paulo	101,537	98,161	+3.44%
São Cristóvão	Sergipe	101,213	95,612	+5.86%
Votuporanga	São Paulo	100,568	96,634	+4.07%
Caçapava	São Paulo	100,071	96,202	+4.02%

=== Distribution ===
Nº	State of Brazil	Number of cities over 100,000 inhabitants
1	São Paulo	81
2	Minas Gerais	36
3	Rio de Janeiro	29
4	Paraná	24
5	Rio Grande do Sul	19
6	Bahia	18
7	Goiás	17
8	Pará	15
8	Pernambuco	15
10	Santa Catarina	14
11	Espírito Santo	10
12	Maranhão	10
13	Ceará	9
14	Mato Grosso	6
15	Sergipe	5
16	Amazonas	4
17	Paraíba	4
18	Rio Grande do Norte	4
19	Rondônia	4
20	Mato Grosso do Sul	3
21	Alagoas	2
22	Amapá	2
23	Piauí	2
24	Tocantins	2
25	Acre	1
26	Distrito Federal	1
27	Roraima	1

== Gallery ==
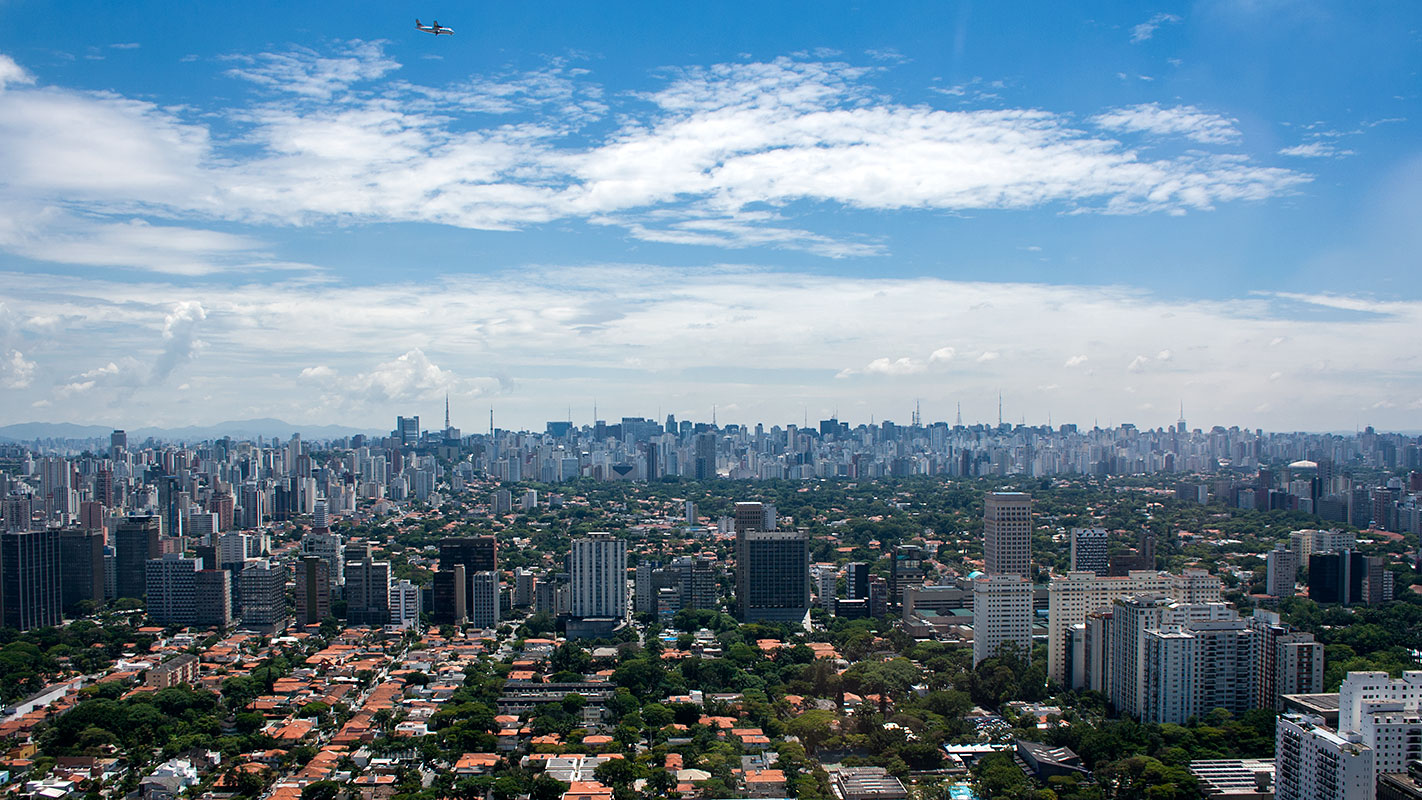
São Paulo

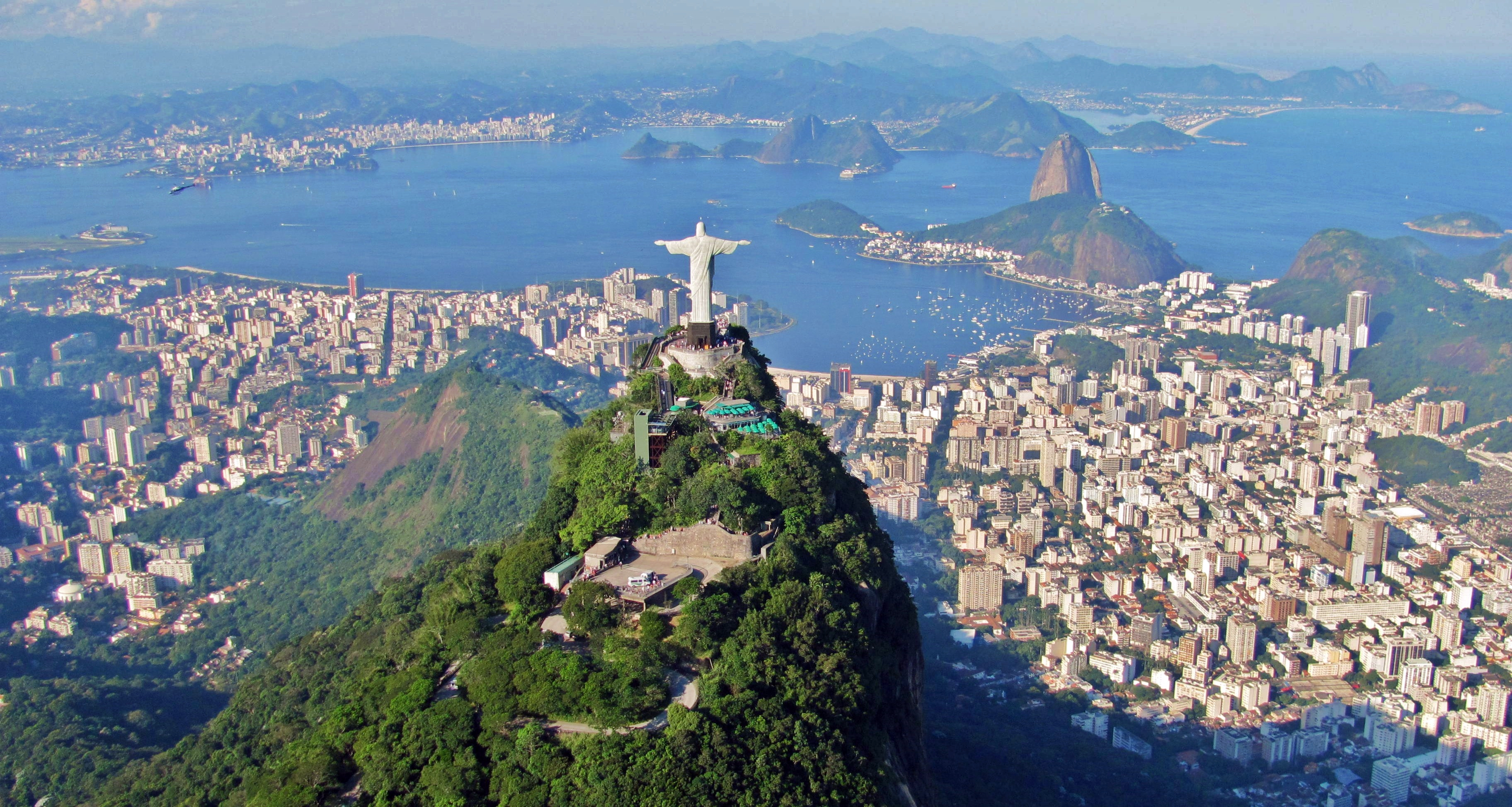
Rio de Janeiro

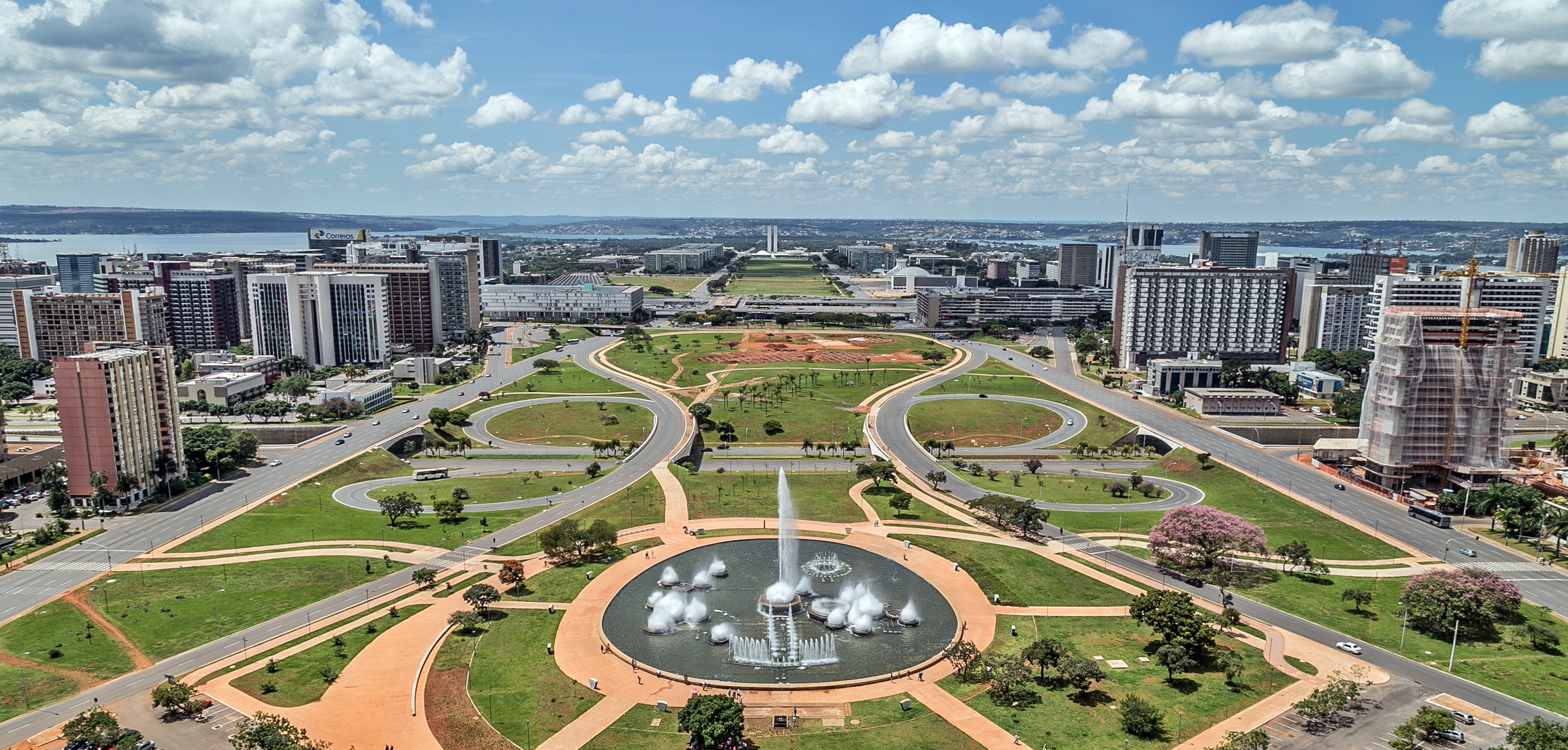
Brasília

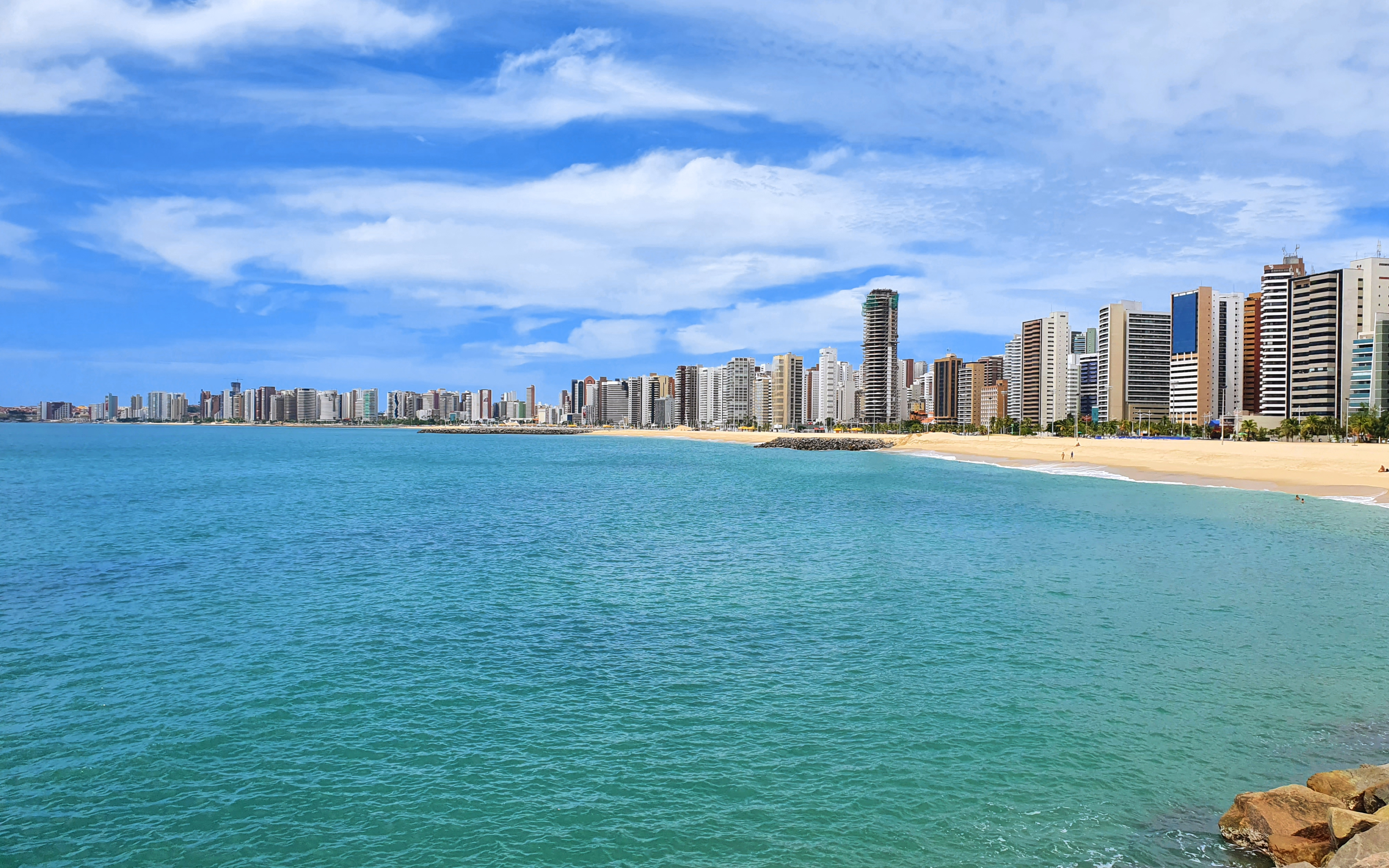
Fortaleza

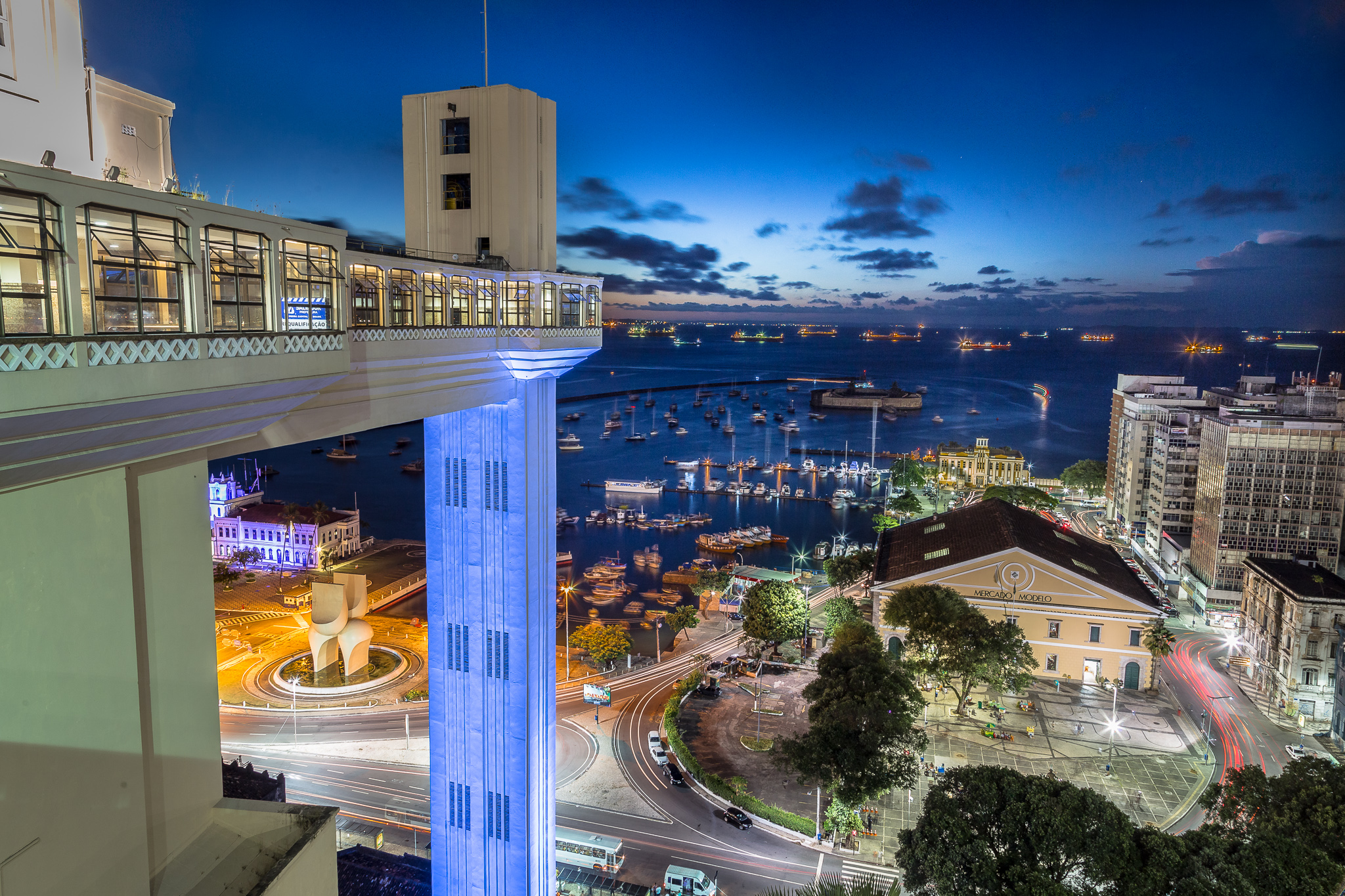
Salvador

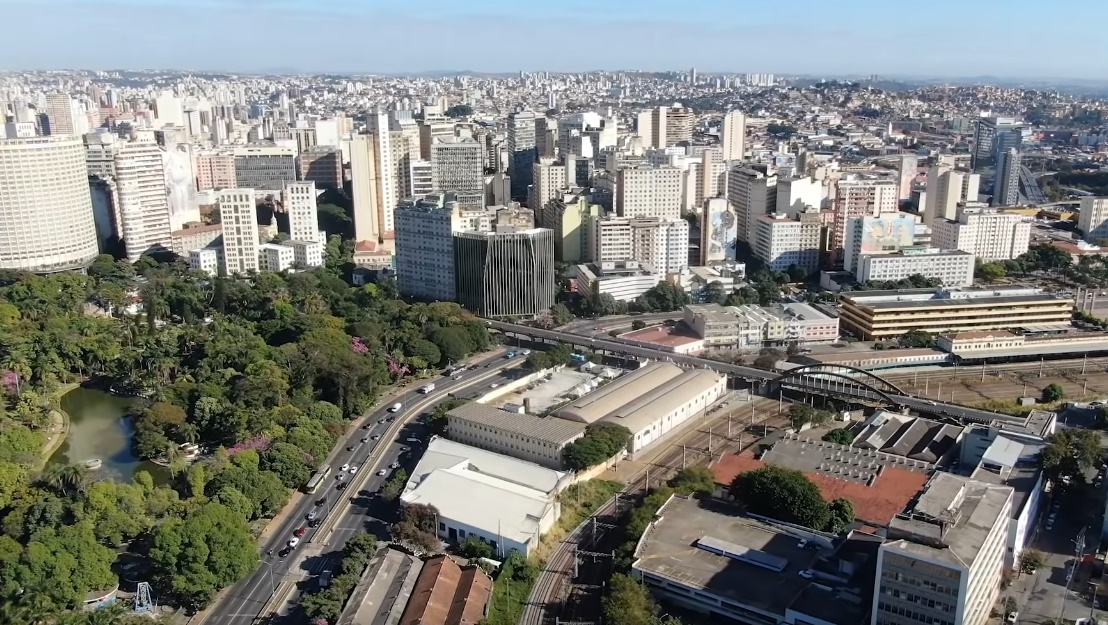
Belo Horizonte

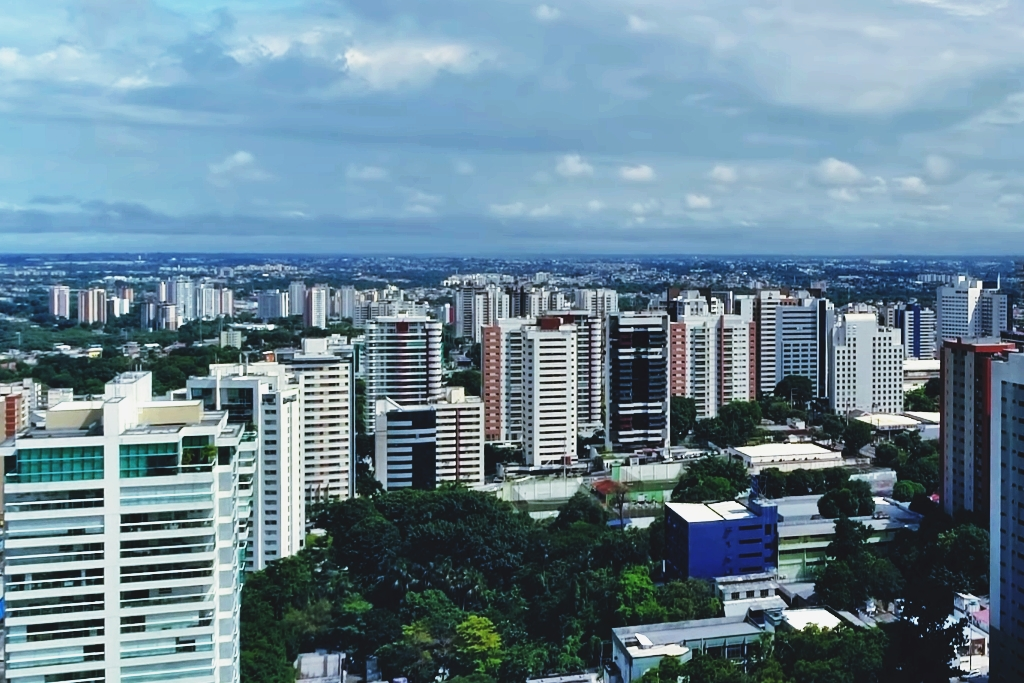
Manaus

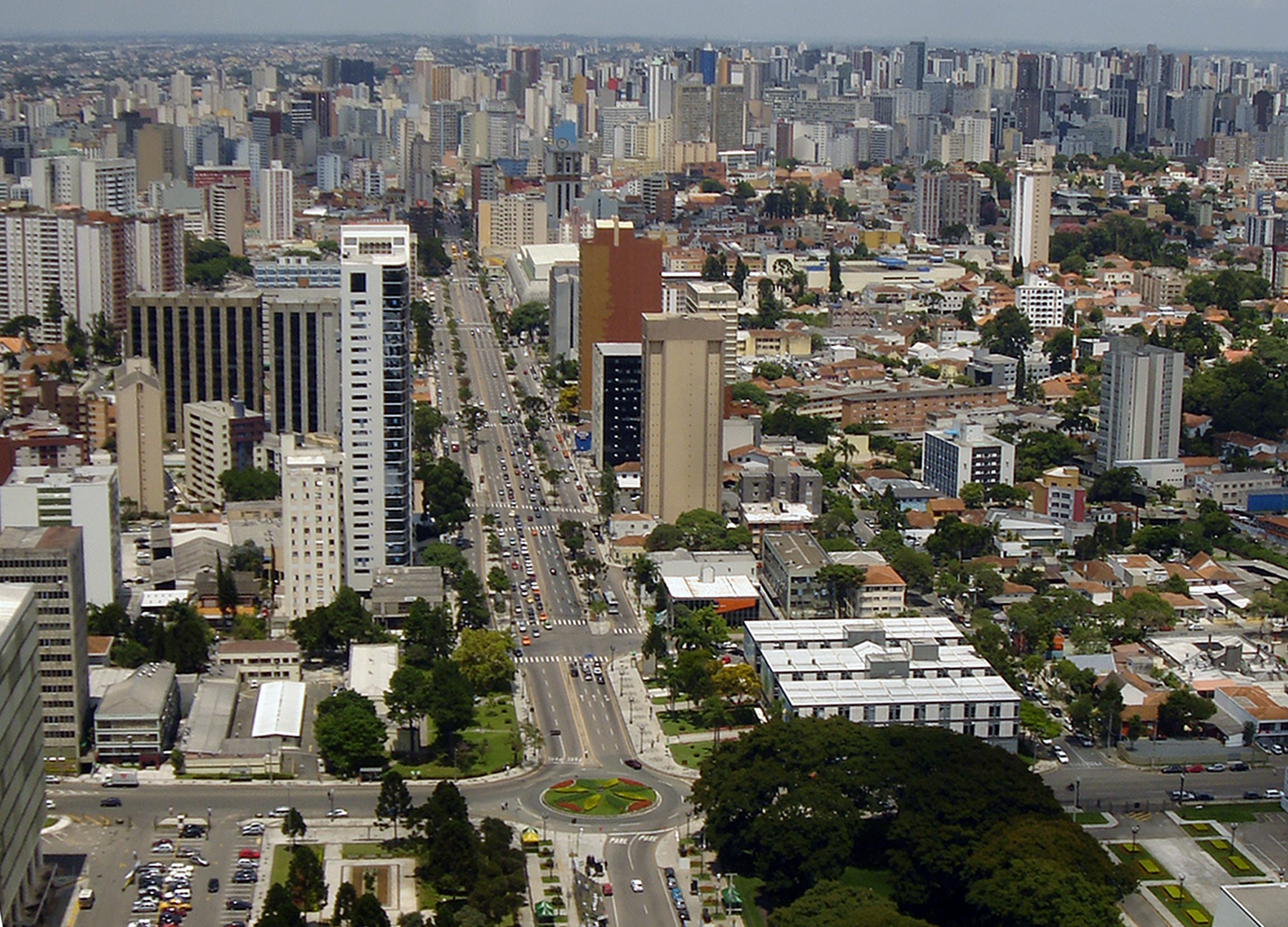
Curitiba

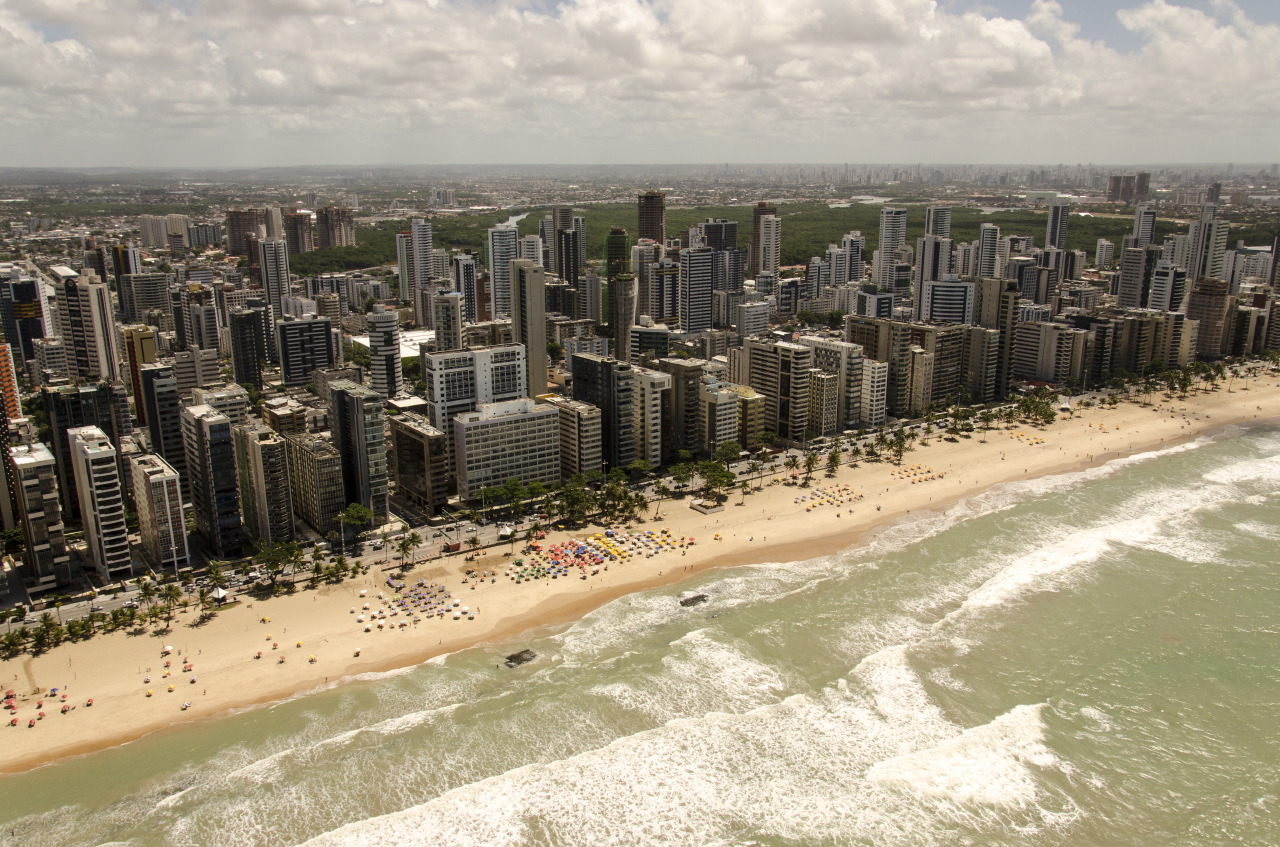
Recife

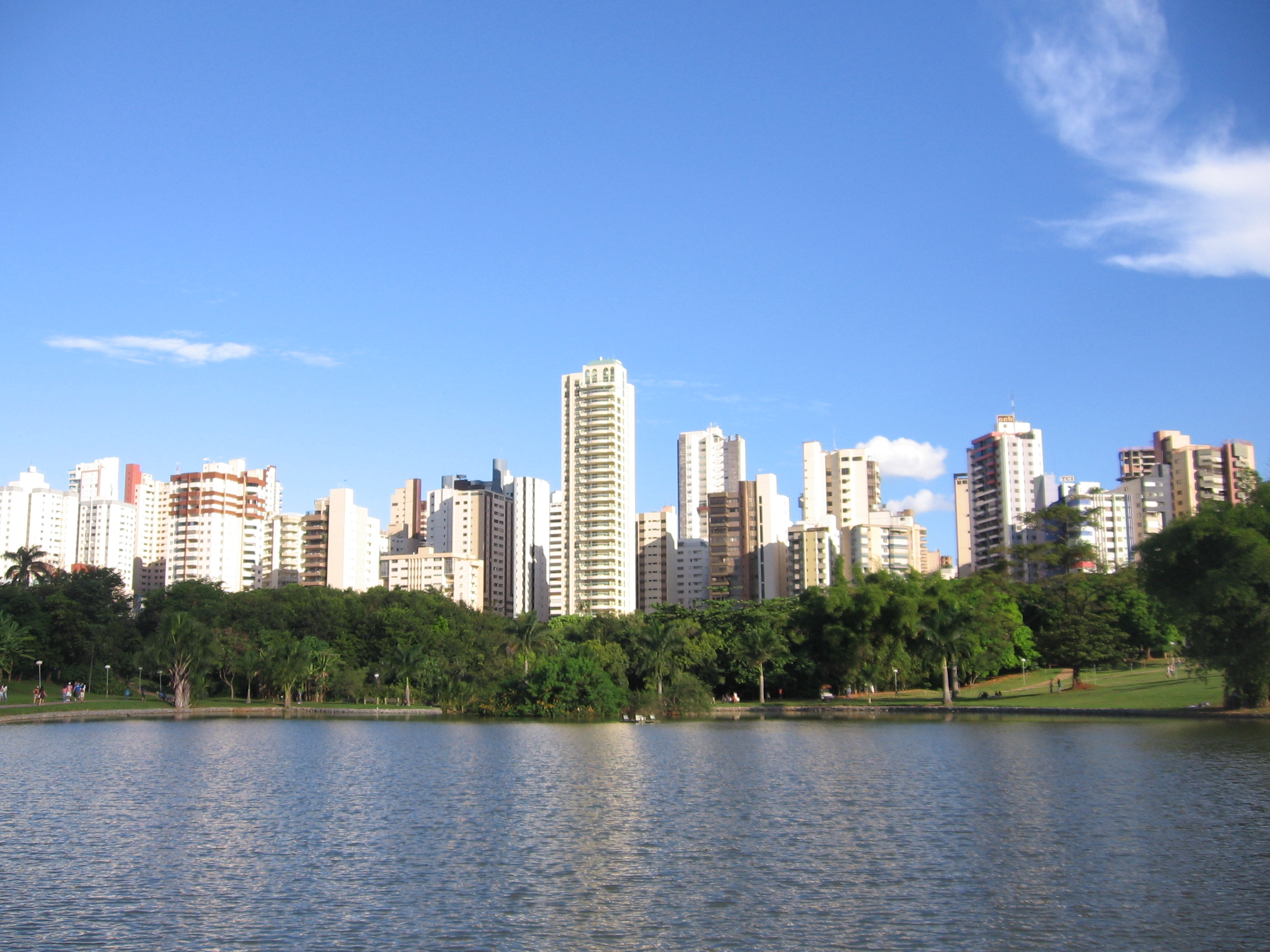
Goiânia

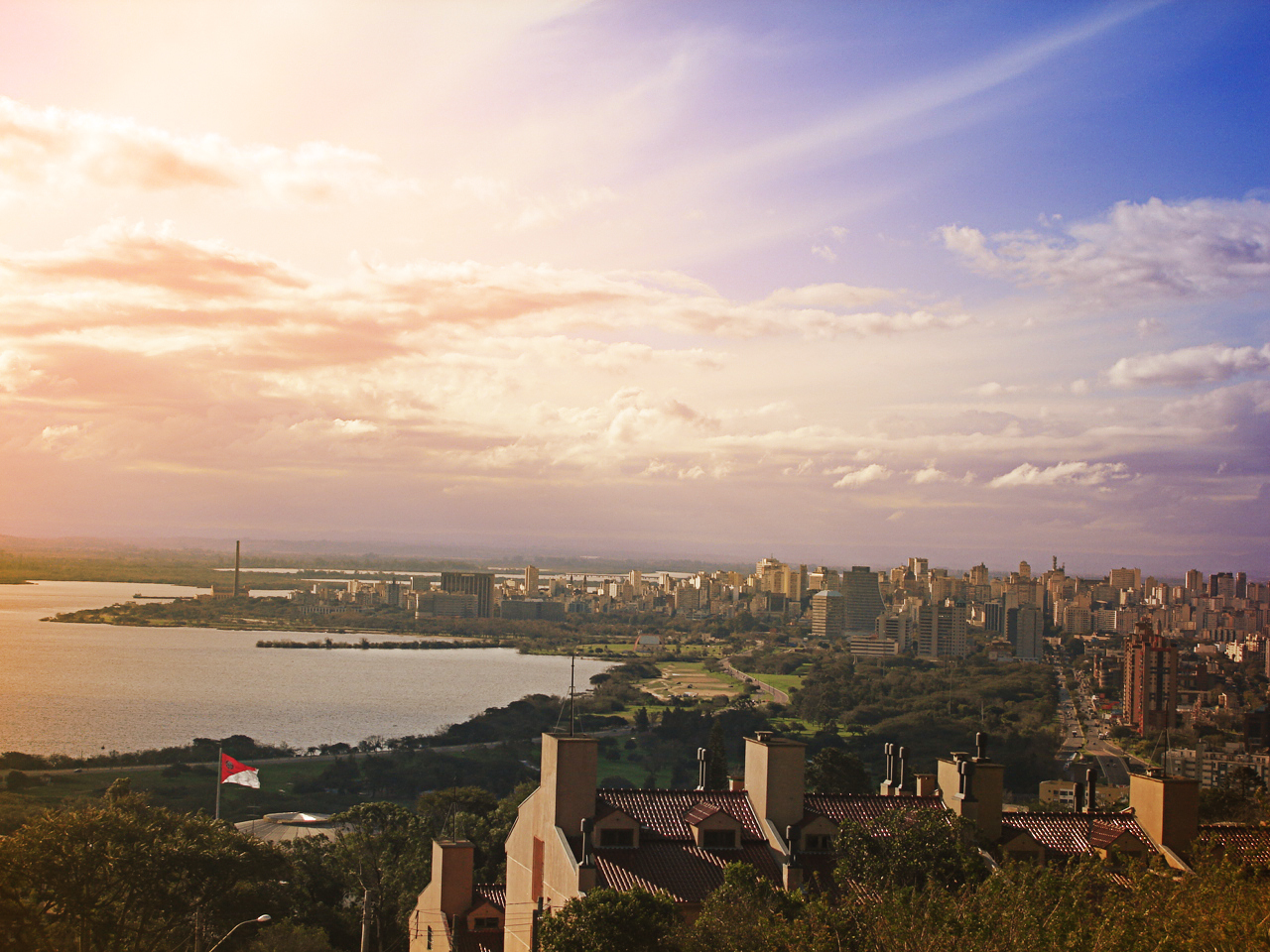
Porto Alegre

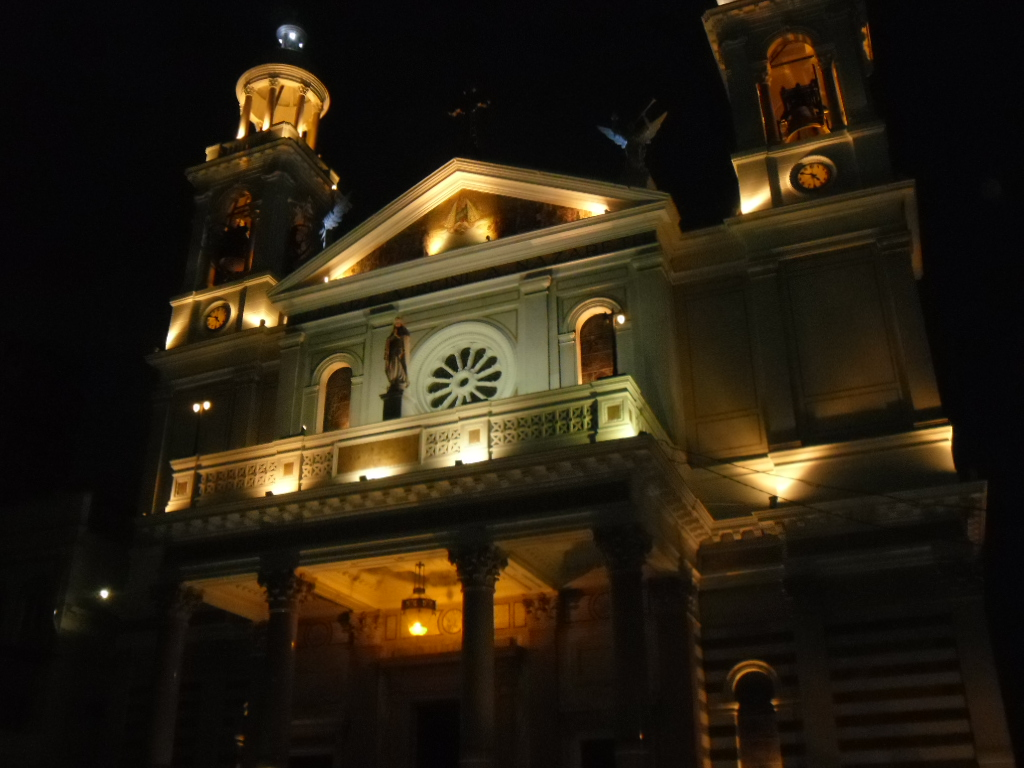
Belém

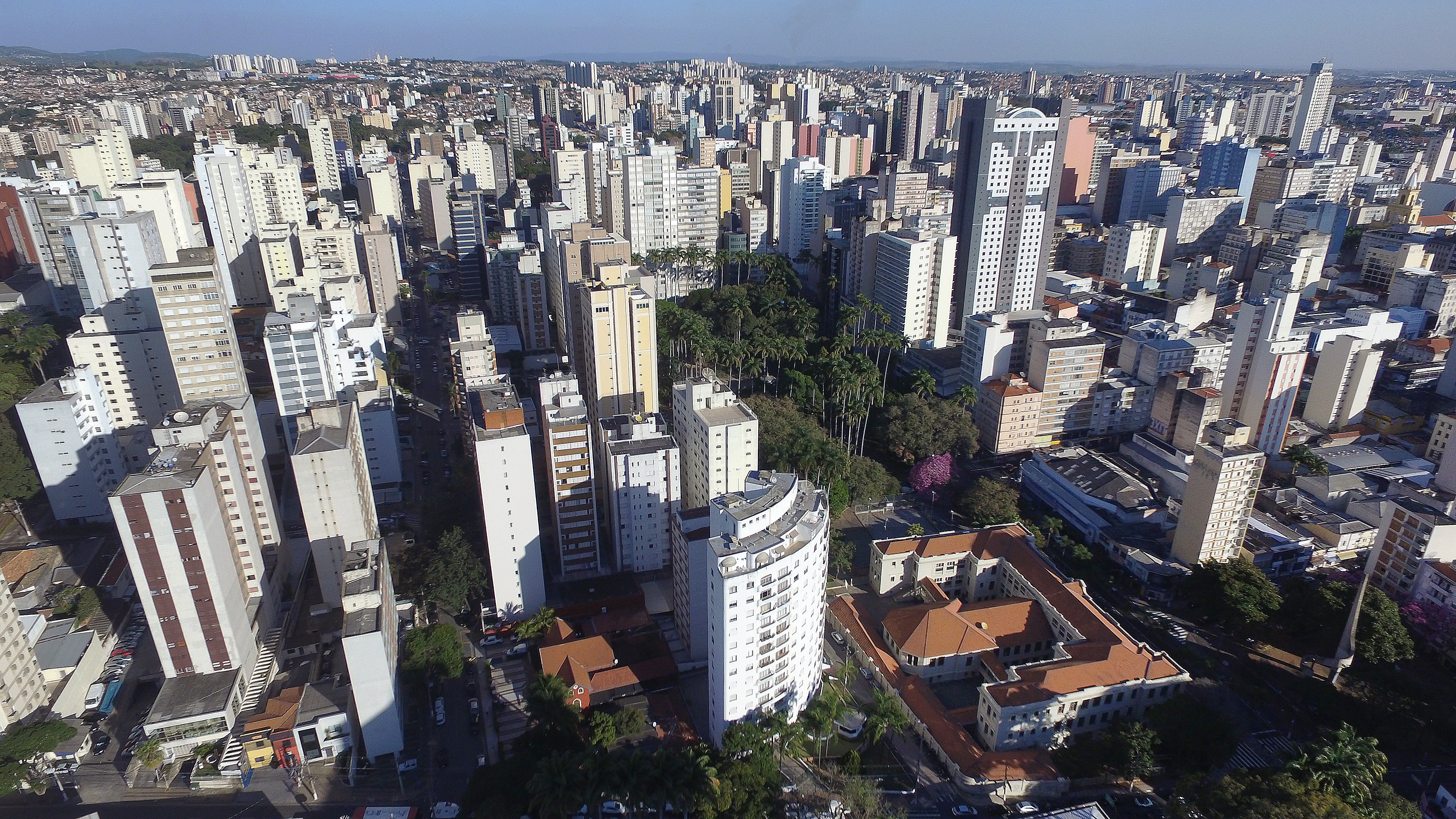
Campinas

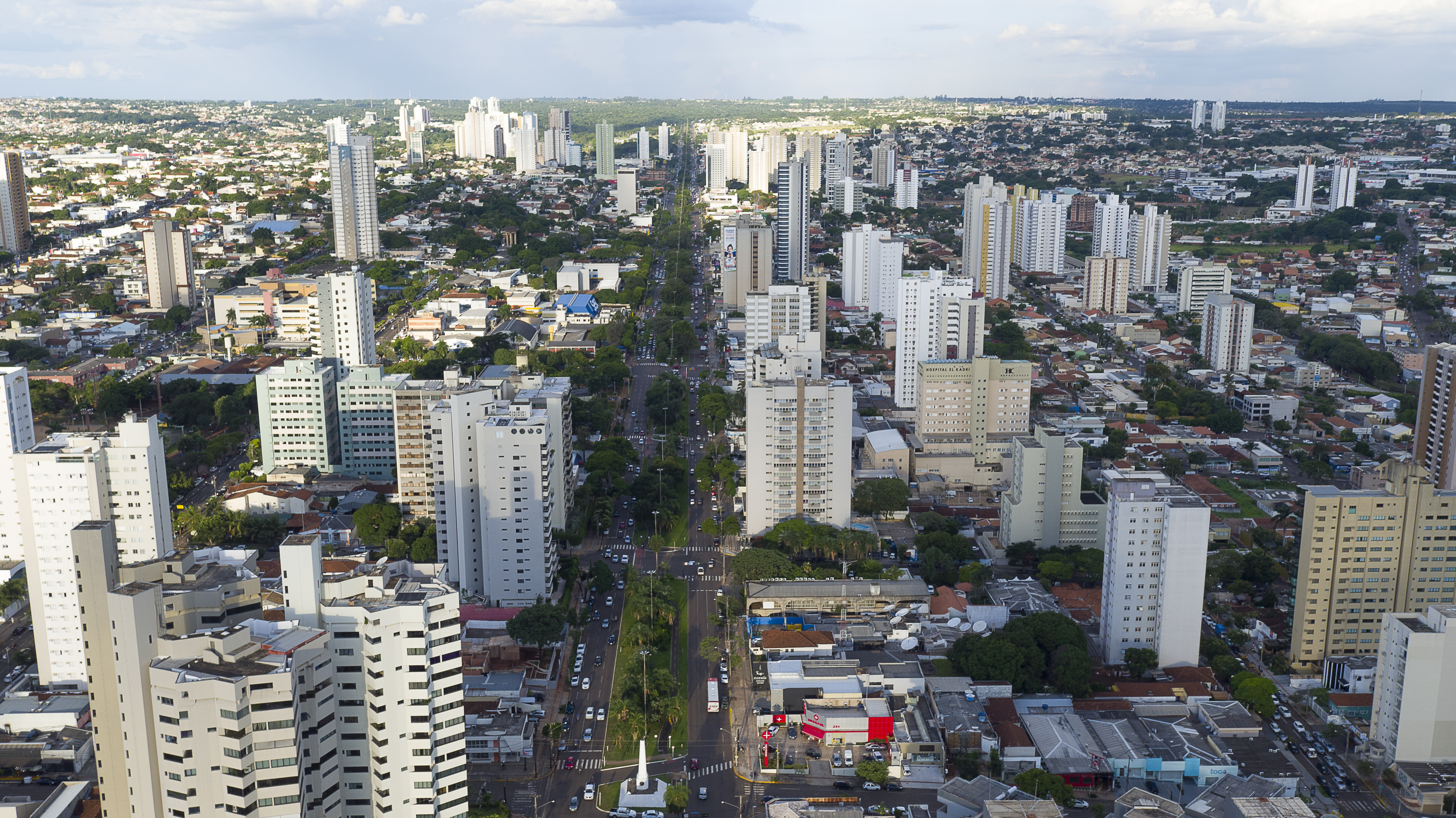
Campo Grande

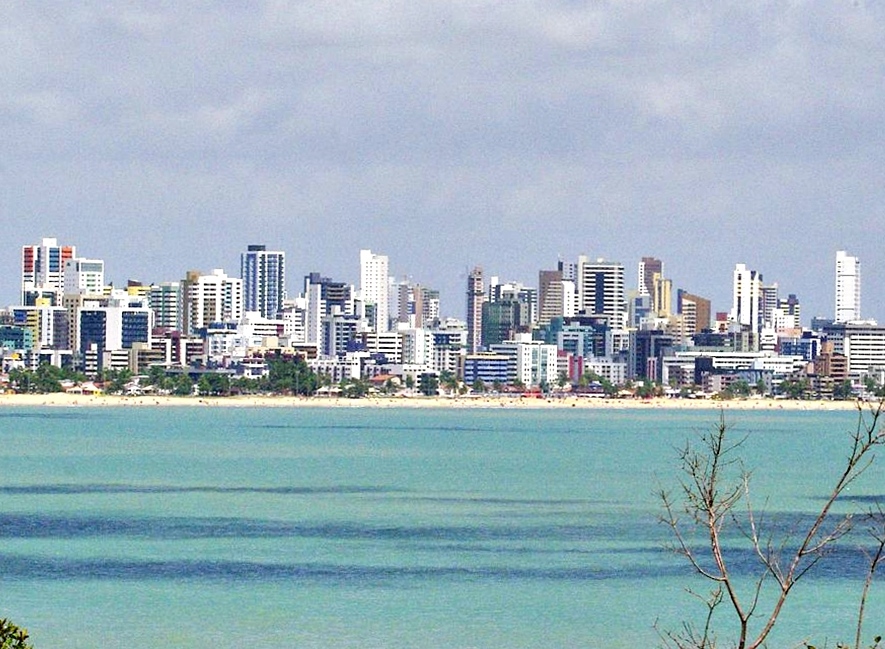
João Pessoa

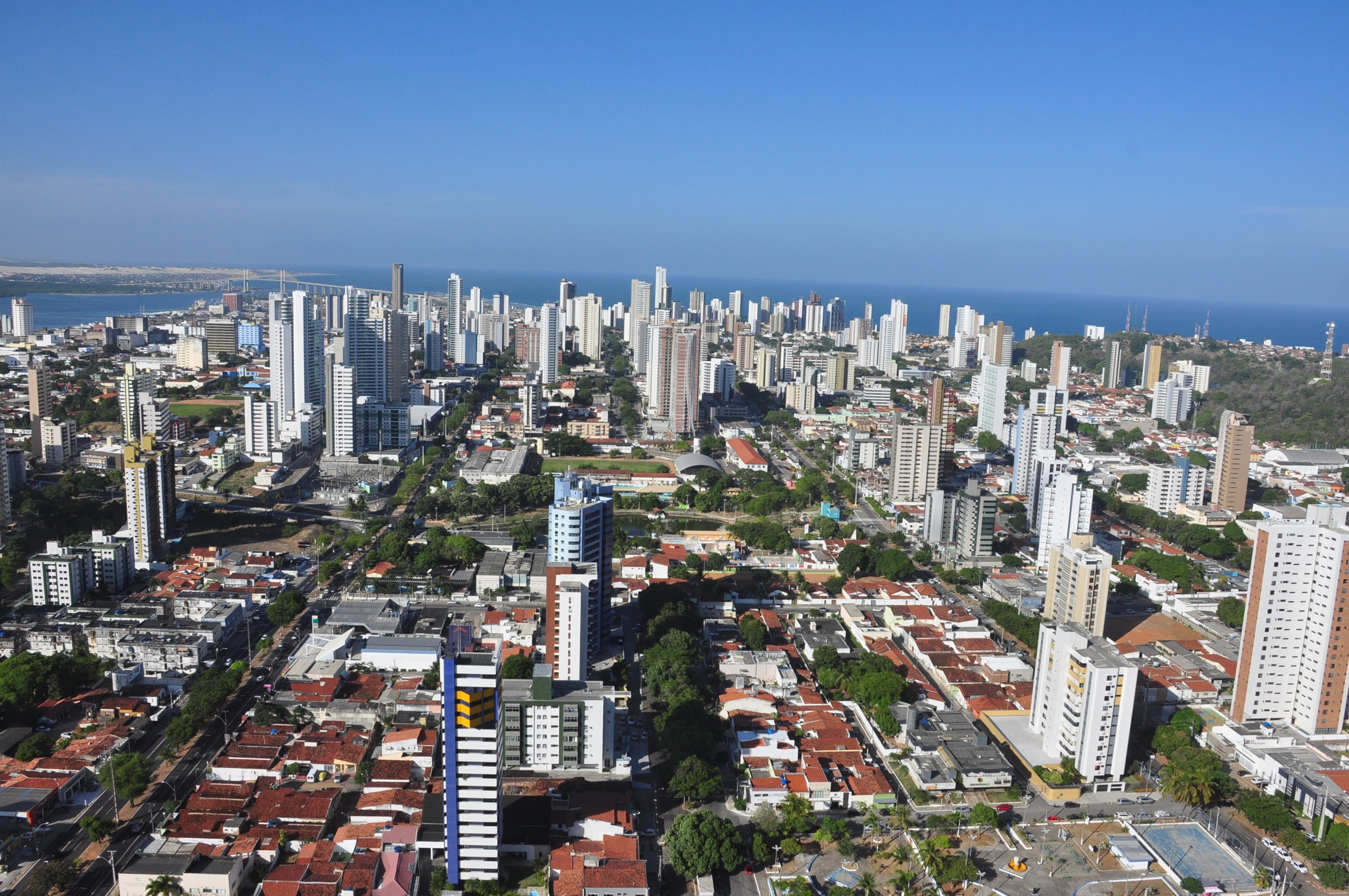
Natal

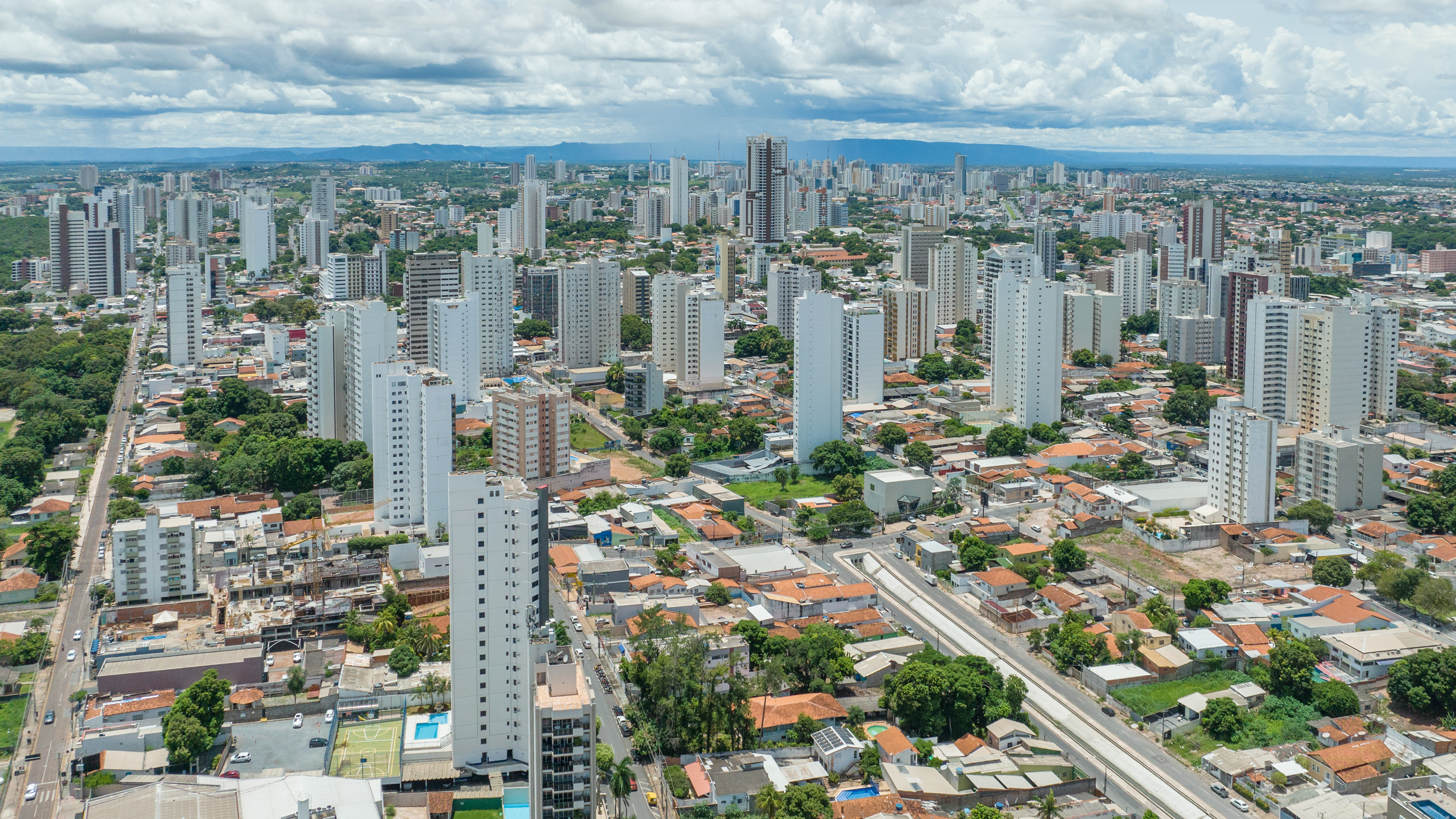
Cuiabá

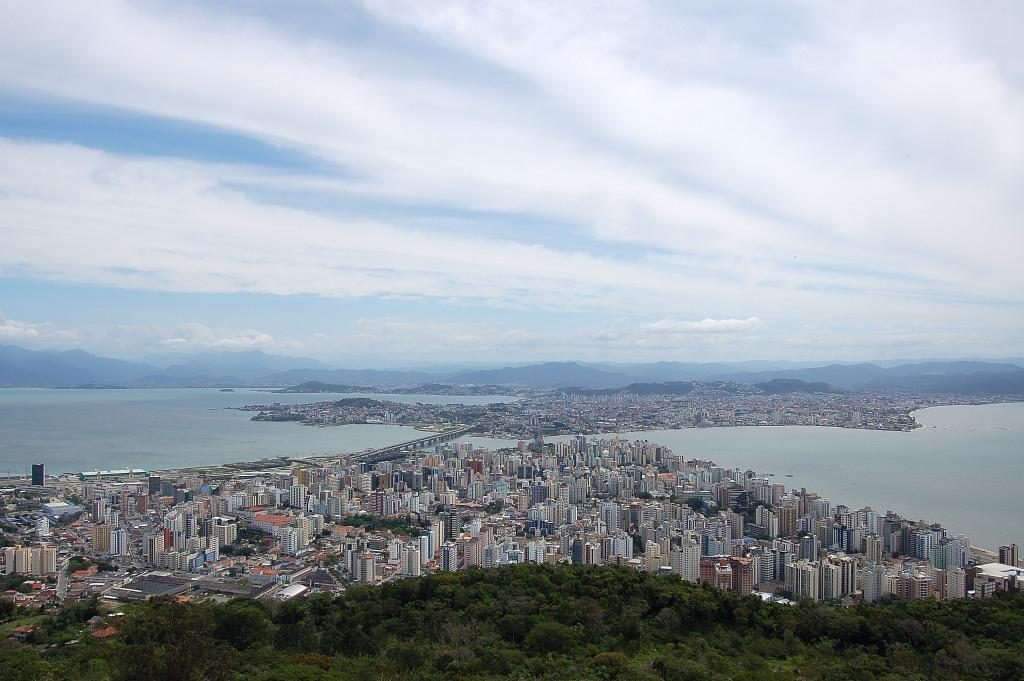
Florianópolis

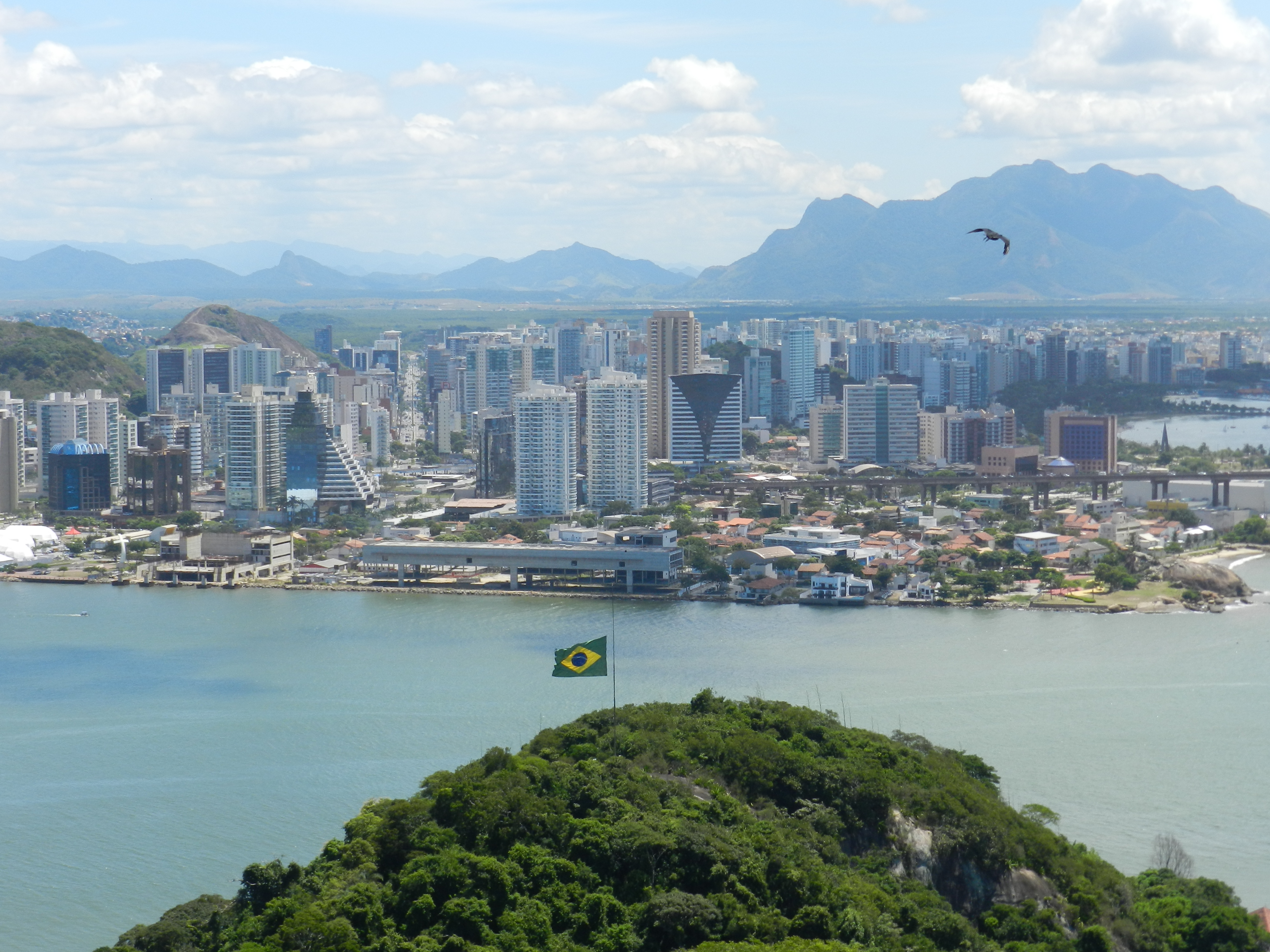
Vitória

== See also ==
- Municipalities of Brazil
- List of metropolitan areas in Brazil
- List of municipalities of Brazil
- List of largest cities in Brazil by state
- List of metropolitan areas in the Americas
- Largest cities in the Americas
- Brazilian Institute of Geography and Statistics
