= Timon, Maranhão =

Timon, Maranhão Municipality of Timon
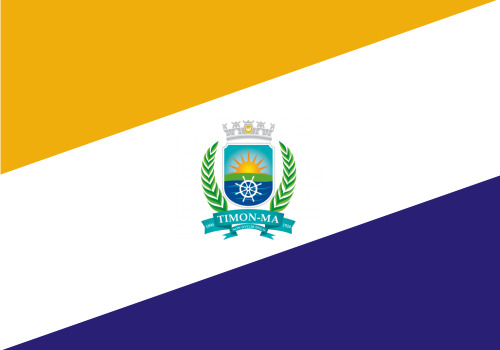
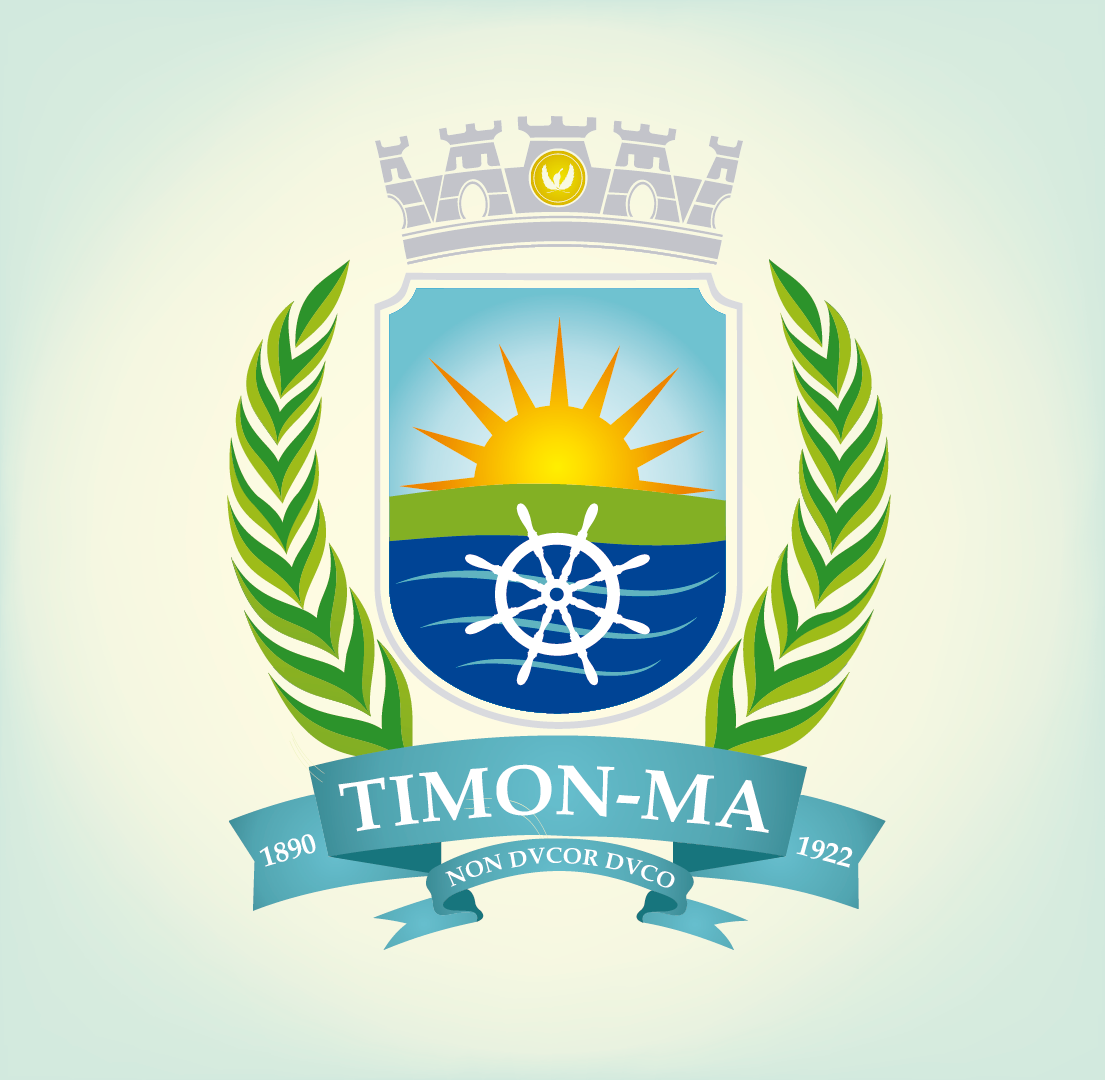
- Flag Coat of arms

- Location in the state of Maranhão and Brazil

- Location in Brazil
- Coordinates: 5°5′38″S 42°50′13″W
- Country: Brazil
- Region: Northeast
- State: Maranhão

Area
  - Total: 1,764.612 km^{2} (681.321 sq mi)

Population (2022 Brazilian Census)
  - Total: 174,465
  - Estimate (2025): 182,711
  - Density: 98.8688/km^{2} (256.069/sq mi)
- Time zone: UTC−3 (BRT)

Timon is a Brazilian municipality in the State of Maranhão. The population is 174,465 (2022 Census) and the total area is 1765 km^{2}.

== Geography ==
Timon is located on the Parnaíba river which forms a natural border with the neighboring city of Teresina, capital of the Piauí state.
