= Fazenda Rio Grande =

Coordinates: 25.6578°S 49.3078°W

- Municipality
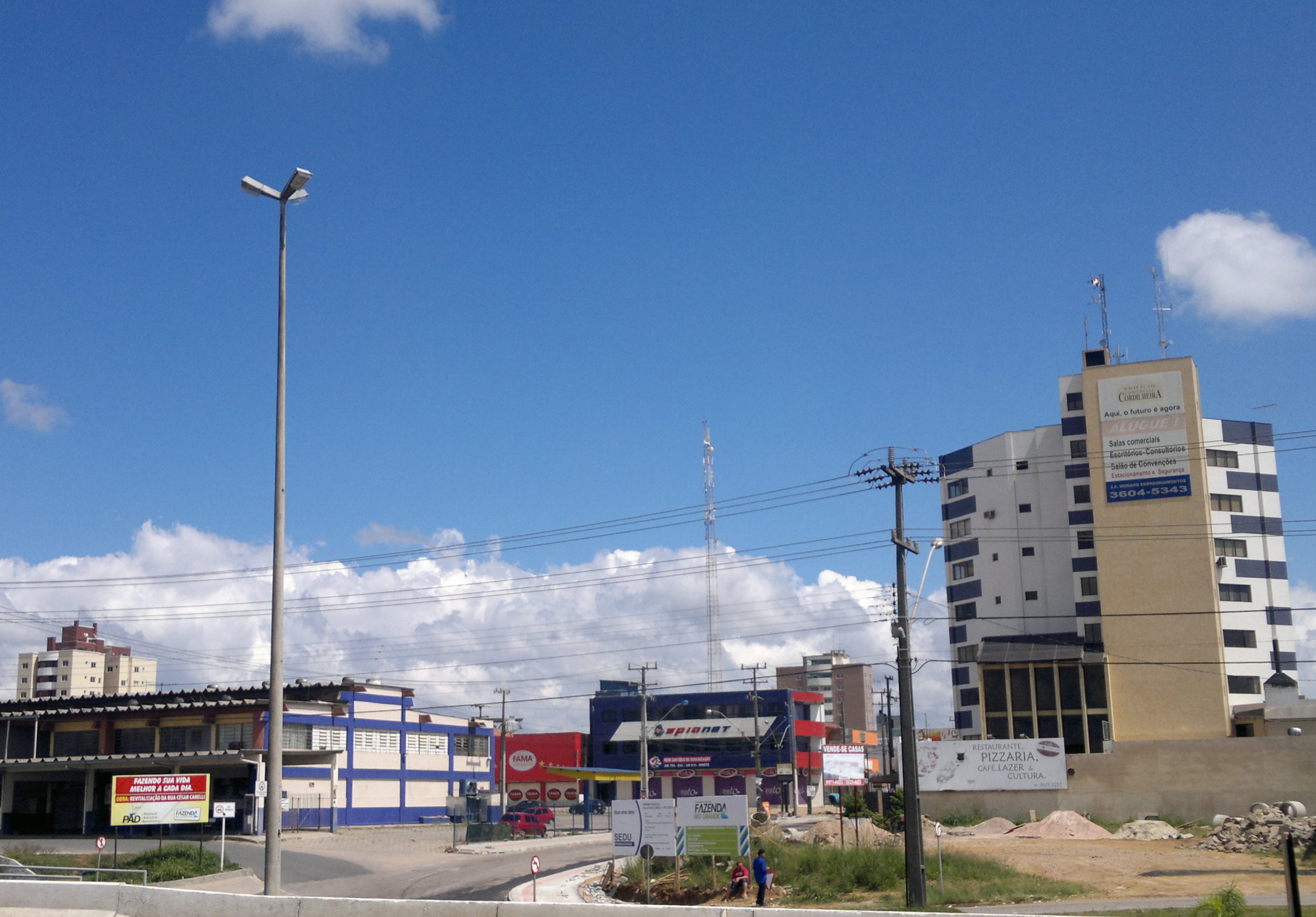

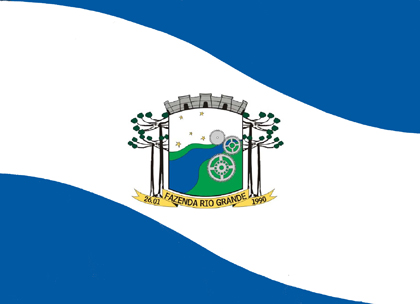
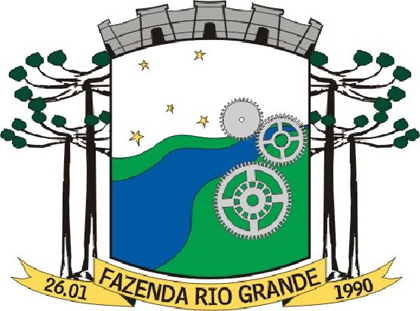
- Flag Coat of arms
- Interactive map of Fazenda Rio Grande
- Country: Brazil
- Region: Southern
- State: Paraná
- Mesoregion: Metropolitana de Curitiba

Population (2022 Census)
  - Total: 148,873
  - Estimate (2025): 165,943
- Time zone: UTC−3 (BRT)

Fazenda Rio Grande is a municipality in the state of Paraná in the Southern Region of Brazil.

== See also ==
- List of municipalities in Paraná
