= Marituba =

Municipality of Marituba Marituba
- Municipality
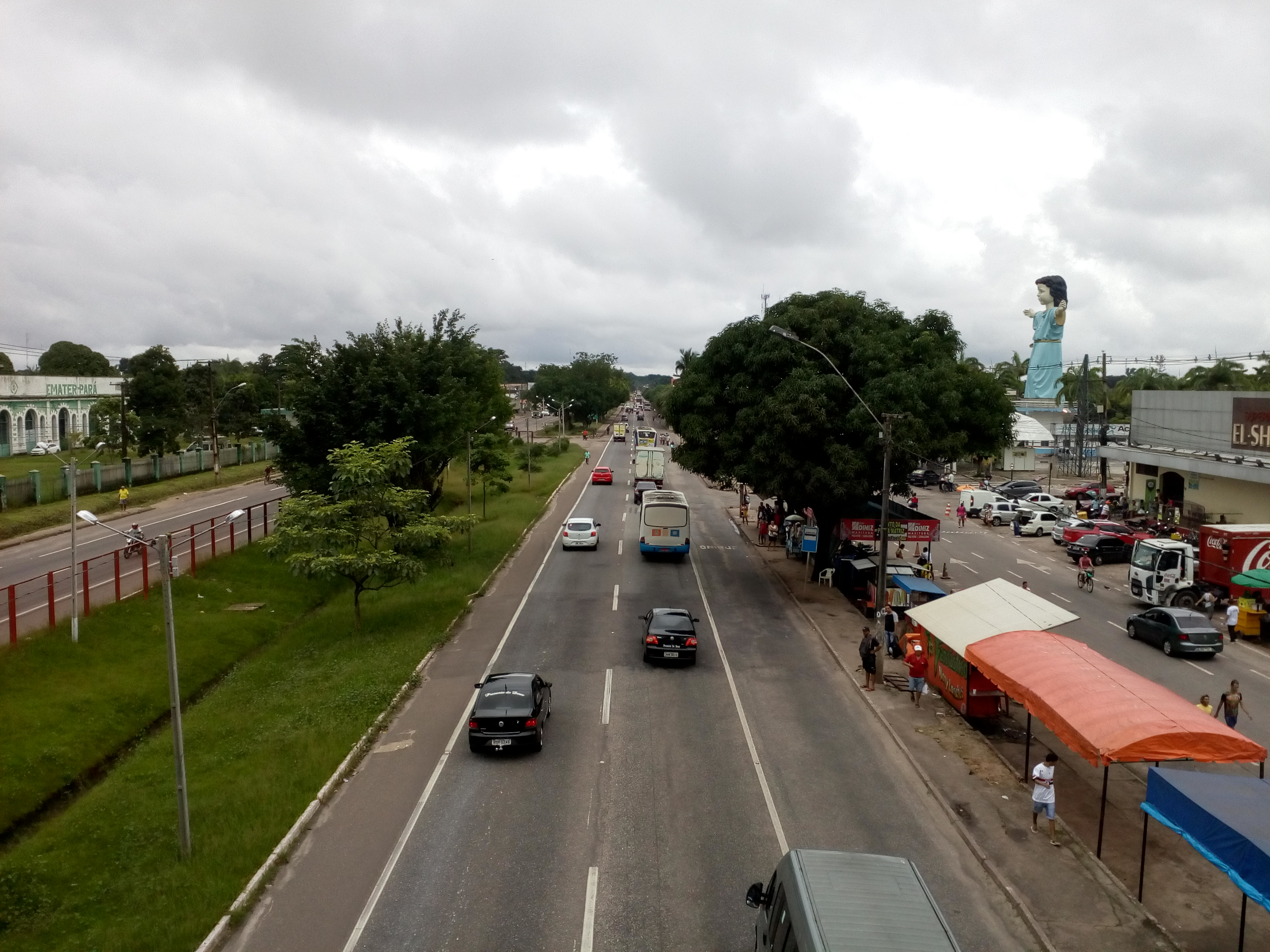

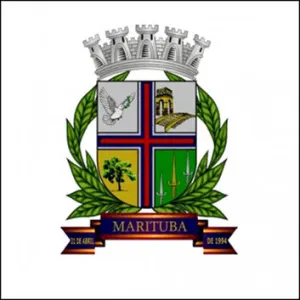
- Flag Coat of arms

- Location in Pará and Brazil

- Location in Brazil
- Coordinates: 01°21′18″S 48°20′31″W
- Country: Brazil
- Region: Northern
- State: Pará
- Mesoregion: Metropolitana de Belém
- Founded: September 22, 1994

Government
  - Mayor: Patrícia Mendes (Republicans (Brazil))

Area
  - Total: 39.901 sq mi (103.343 km^{2})

Population (2022 Census)
  - Total: 111,785
  - Estimate (2025): 119,437
  - Density: 2,801.56/sq mi (1,081.69/km^{2})
- Time zone: UTC−3 (BRT)
- HDI' (2000): 0.717 – medium
- Website: Official website

Marituba is a municipality in the state of Pará in the Northern region of Brazil. It is the smallest municipality of Pará and the smallest in all Northern Brazil.

== See also ==
- List of municipalities in Pará
