= Araucária =

- Municipality
- The Municipality of Araucária
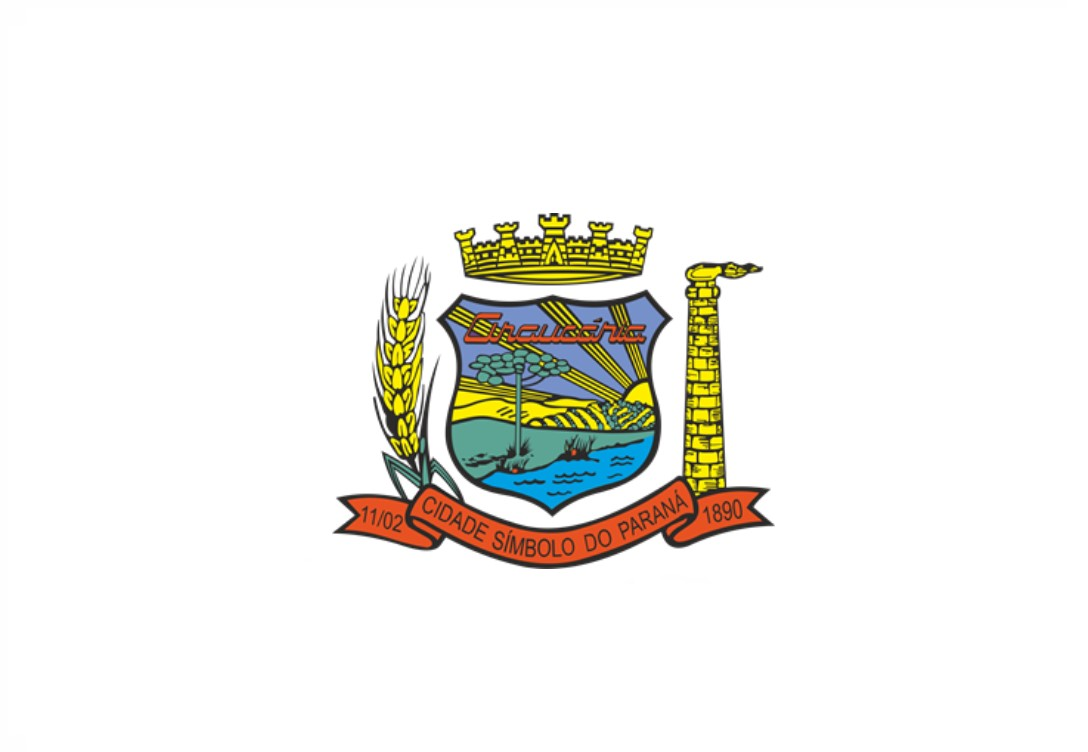
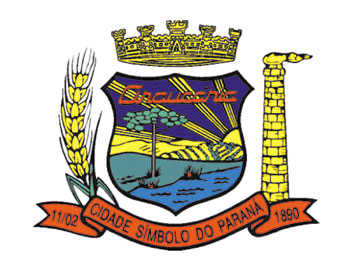
- Flag Coat of arms
- Nickname: Cidade Símbolo do Paraná ("Paraná's Symbol City")

- Location in Brazil
- Coordinates: 25°25′S 49°15′W
- Country: Brazil
- Region: South
- State: Paraná
- Founded: 11 February 1890

Government
  - Mayor: Hissam Hussein Dehaini (Cidadania)

Area
  - Total: 469.240 km^{2} (181.175 sq mi)
- Elevation: 897 m (2,943 ft)

Population (2022 Census)
  - Total: 151,666
  - Estimate (2025): 162,247
  - Density: 323.216/km^{2} (837.126/sq mi)
- Time zone: UTC-3 (UTC-3)
  - Summer (DST): UTC-2 (UTC-2)
- CEP: 83700-000 to 83709-999
- Area code: +55 41
- Website: Araucária, Paraná

Araucária is a municipality in the Brazilian state of Paraná. The population in 2022 Censuswas 151,666 inhabitants.

== History ==
The first movement of the white man in today Araucaria Brazil, dating back to the year 1668, a period in which Domingos Rodrigues da Cunha received a land grant, donated by Captain Settler, Gabriel Lara, the strong man of Paraná that period. Other land grants were given to their children Luiz Rodrigues Garcia and Elder, and were in Pass Apiaúna, making currency with the Iguazu River, which then received the name of Rio Grande de Curitiba. These families started mowing, laid the first seeds and the place became a point of reference. Some years after developed a town that was named Tindiqüera. The occupation was relatively quick and settled there the surgeon Pascoal Fernandes Leite, Captain Manoel de Carvalho Biting and many others. The historical origin of Tindiqüera, whence the Araucaria, deserves a separate chapter in the historiography of Paraná, for its wealth. Reportedly lived in the small village of Nossa Senhora da Luz dos Pinhais later Curitiba, a large family of Maia, and the brave men who kept rushing and troubled relations with the authorities and other settlers of the place. [6] The incidents have followed them the condition of personas non incipient grateful in Curitiba, even to the point of being forced to move away from the village and take refuge in a distant place, to prevent the course of justice, the persecuted, and the vengeance of the people . The venue for large family Maia was exactly Tindiqüera of town, situated on the banks of the Iguazú and right on top of an ancient Indian village. In 1876 the region received strong immigration flow of Russians, Poles and Germans, who gave a joint action to place progress through Cologne Thomaz Coelho. The advent of the Republic encouraged the community to draw up a petition, which was duly forwarded to the state government, through Mr Victor Ferreira do Amaral. On February 11, 1890, by State Decree No. 40, signed into law by Governor José Marques Guimaraes, was created the city, with territory taken from the cities of Curitiba and Pinhais, and renamed Araucária The official installation took place on 1 March 1890. The first mayor of the municipality was Manoel Gonçalves Ferreira.

By Law No. 1055 of April 5, 1911, the term was created Judiciary Araucaria, whose installation was on June 4, 1911. On April 19, 1919, through Law No. 1908 was elevated to the District, and the installation was done by Stanislaus Cardoso on 14 May of the same year. Decree-Law No. 93 of September 14, 1948, returned to the category of term Judiciary, and January 25, 1949, was elevated to the rank of District again, this time having been installed by Luiz de Albuquerque Maranhao Junior.

== Sister City ==
- Wrocław, Lower Silesia, Poland
