= Almirante Tamandaré, Paraná =

Almirante Tamandaré
- Municipality
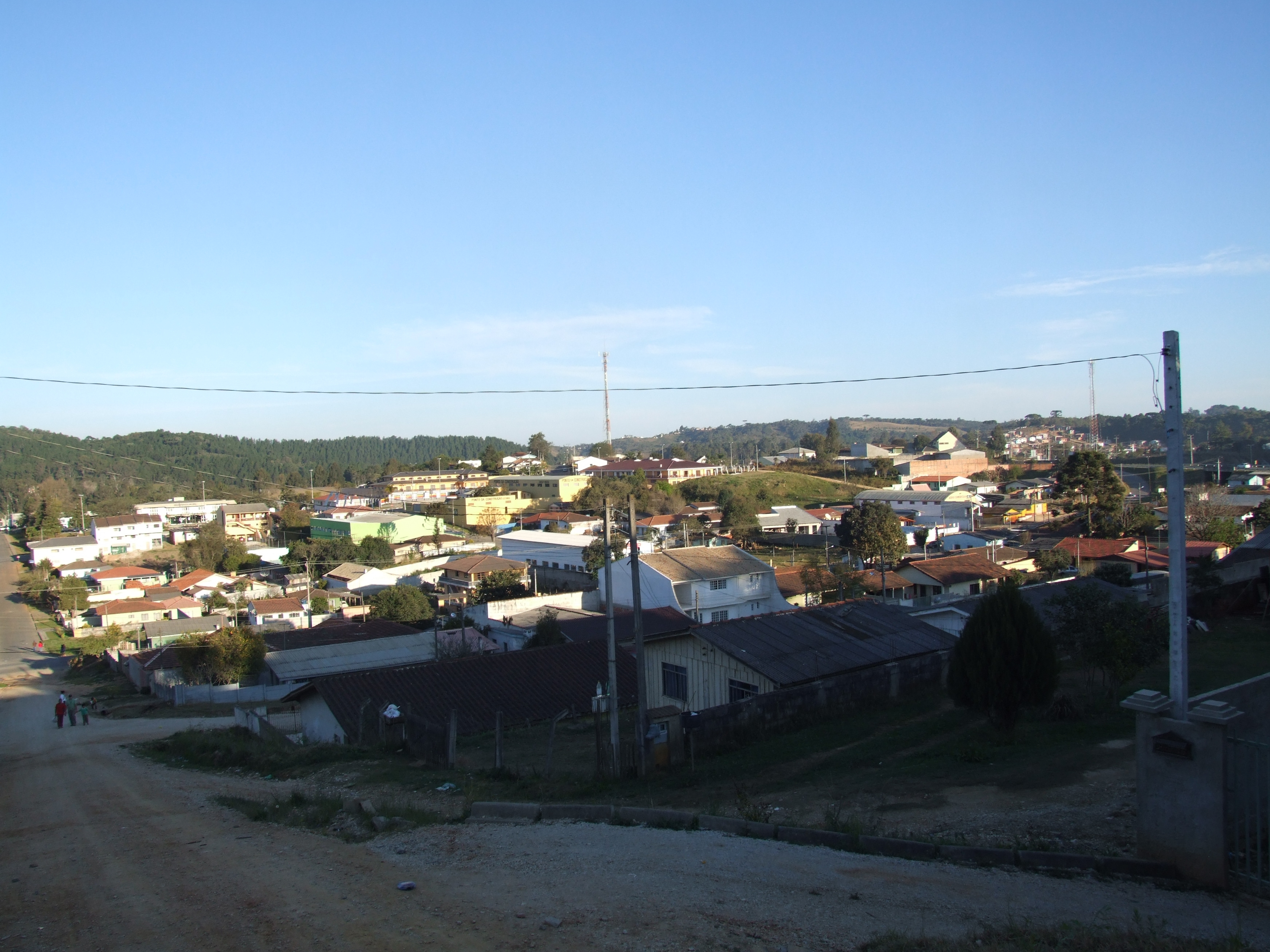

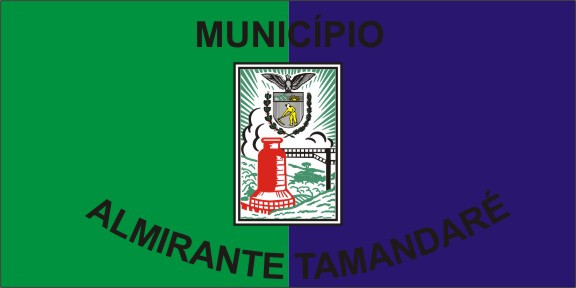
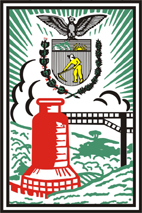
- Flag Coat of arms

- Location of Almirante Tamandaré, Paraná

- Location in Brazil
- Coordinates: 25°19′30″S 49°18′36″W
- Country: Brazil
- Region: Southern
- State: Paraná
- Mesoregion: Metropolitana de Curitiba

Area
  - Total: 75.191 sq mi (194.744 km^{2})
- Elevation: 3,120 ft (950 m)

Population (2022 Census)
  - Total: 119,825
  - Estimate (2025): 125,861
  - Density: 1,593.61/sq mi (615.295/km^{2})
- Time zone: UTC−3 (BRT)

Almirante Tamandaré is a municipality in the state of Paraná in the Southern Region of Brazil.

== See also ==
- List of municipalities in Paraná
