= Miss Brazil CNB 2018 =

- Date: August 11, 2018
- Presenters: Lívia Nepomuceno; Juliano Crema; Alessandro Boiah; Daniela Song
- Venue: Hotel do Bosque, Angra dos Reis, Rio de Janeiro, Brazil
- Broadcaster: Rede Brasil; Master TV
- Entrants: 48
- Placements: 21
- Winner: Jéssica Carvalho; Piauí
- Congeniality: Ruth Raphaella; Alagoas
- Photogenic: Ruth Raphaella; Alagoas

Miss Brazil CNB 2018 was the 29th edition of the Miss Brazil CNB pageant and the 4th under CNB Miss Brazil. The contest took place on August 11, 2018. Each state, the Federal District and various Insular Regions & Cities competed for the title. Gabrielle Vilela of Rio de Janeiro crowned her successor, Jéssica Carvalho of Piauí at the end of the contest. Carvalho represented Brazil at Miss World 2018. The contest was held at the Hotel do Bosque in Angra dos Reis, Rio de Janeiro, Brazil.

== Results ==
Final results	Contestant
Miss Brazil CNB 2018	Piauí - Jéssica Carvalho
1st Runner-up	Amazonas - Jainy Lemos
2nd Runner-up	Espírito Santo - Marina Ramada
Top 8	Ceará - Inessa Pontes; Pará - Isabella Garcia; Rio Grande do Norte - Sarah Torres; Rio Grande do Sul - Joanna Camargo; São Paulo - Sthefany Schunck
Top 21	Alagoas - Ruth Raphaella; Amapá - Sheyzi Brazão; (Rio de Janeiro (state)) Costa do Sol - Gleycy Correia; (Santa Catarina (state)) Costa Verde & Mar - Gabrielli Frozza; Greater Florianópolis - Helena Maier; (Rio Grande do Sul) Ilha da Pintada - Tainá Laydner; (Rio Grande do Sul) Ilha dos Lobos - Karine Martovicz; (Rio de Janeiro (state)) Ilha Grande - Greice Fontes; Minas Gerais - Duda Magalhães; Paraíba - Ariádine Maroja; Planalto Central - Karen Oncken; Pernambuco - Tallita Martins; (São Paulo (state)) Vale do Rio Grande - Cristielli Camargo

=== Regional Queens of Beauty ===
Award	Winner
Miss Midwest	Planalto Central - Karen Oncken
Miss North	Amazonas - Jainy Lemos
Miss Northeast	Ceará - Inessa Pontes
Miss South	Rio Grande do Sul - Joanna Camargo
Miss Southeast	Espírito Santo - Marina Ramada

=== Special awards ===
Award	Winner
Miss Congeniality	Alagoas - Ruth Raphaella
Miss Cordiality	Maranhão - Karen Farias
Miss Personality (Tie)	(Rio Grande do Sul) Ilha dos Marinheiros - Gabriella Freo
Miss Personality (Tie)	Santa Catarina - Thylara Brenner
Miss Photogenic	Alagoas - Ruth Raphaella

== Challenge Events ==
=== Beauty with a Purpose ===
Final results	Contestant
Winner (Tie)	Pará - Isabella Garcia; Rio Grande do Sul - Joanna Camargo
Top 10	Bahia - Marcela Moura; (Rio de Janeiro (state)) Costa do Sol - Gleycy Correia; (Santa Catarina (state)) Costa Verde & Mar - Gabrielli Frozza; Greater Curitiba - Endgel Cruz; (Rio Grande do Sul) Ilha dos Marinheiros - Gabriella Freo; Piauí - Jéssica Carvalho; Santa Catarina - Thylara Brenner; São Paulo - Sthefany Schunck

=== Miss Popularity ===
Final results	Contestant
Winner	Planalto Central - Karen Oncken

=== Miss Talent ===
Final results	Contestant
Winner	(São Paulo (state)) Vale do Rio Grande - Cristielli Camargo

=== Miss Top Model ===
Final results	Contestant
Winner	Pernambuco - Tallita Martins

== Delegates ==
The delegates for Miss Brazil CNB 2018 were:

=== States ===
- Acre - Hyalina Lins
- Alagoas - Ruth Raphaela
- Amapá - Sheyzi Brazão
- Amazonas - Jainy Lemos
- Bahia - Marcela Moura
- Ceará - Innessa Pontes
- Espírito Santo - Marina Ramada
- Goiás - Camilla Syal
- Maranhão - Kéren Farias
- Mato Grosso - Izabela de Deus
- Mato Grosso do Sul - Ingrid Matzembacher
- Minas Gerais - Duda Magalhães
- Pará - Isabella Garcia
- Paraíba - Ariádine Maroja
- Paraná - Maisa Sanvi
- Pernambuco - Tallita Martins
- Piauí - Jéssica Carvalho
- Rio de Janeiro - Mayara Costa
- Rio Grande do Norte - Sarah Torres
- Rio Grande do Sul - Joanna Camargo
- Rondônia - Caroline Ferreira
- Santa Catarina - Thylara Brenner
- São Paulo - Sthefany Schunck
- Sergipe - Franciele Alves
- Tocantins - Marina Cerqueira

=== Insular Regions and Cities ===
- (Rio de Janeiro (state)) Agulhas Negras - Lara Gonçalves
- Brasília - Isabela Schott
- (Rio de Janeiro (state)) Costa do Sol - Gleycy Correia
- (Santa Catarina (state)) Costa Verde & Mar - Gabrielli Frozza
- Greater Curitiba - Endgel Cruz
- Greater Florianópolis - Helena Maier
- Greater São Paulo - Natália Negrão
- (Rio Grande do Sul) Ilha da Pintada - Tainá Laydner
- (Rio Grande do Sul) Ilha dos Lobos - Karine Martovicz
- (Rio Grande do Sul) Ilha dos Marinheiros - Gabriela Freo
- (Rio de Janeiro (state)) Ilha Grande - Greice Fontes
- Ilhas de Búzios - Stéphanie Paula
- Ilhas de Ipanema - Andressa Scherer
- (Mato Grosso) Ilhas do Araguaia - Adila Silva
- (Rio Grande do Sul) Ilhas do Delta do Jacuí - Vanessa Salva
- (Pará) Marajó - Thaisi Dias
- Planalto Central - Karen Oncken
- Plano Piloto - Duda Estrela
- Região Centro Paulista - Rafaela Martins
- (Minas Gerais) Serra da Mantiqueira - Marcela Ribeiro
- Sertão Sergipano - Agda Costa
- (São Paulo (state)) Vale do Paraíba - Jéssica Costa
- (São Paulo (state)) Vale do Rio Grande - Cristielli Camargo

== Notes ==
=== Did not compete ===
- Distrito Federal (competed as Miss Brasília)
- Roraima
