= Costa do Sol State Park =

State park in Rio de Janeiro, Brazil

- Parque Estadual da Costa do Sol
- IUCN category II (national park)
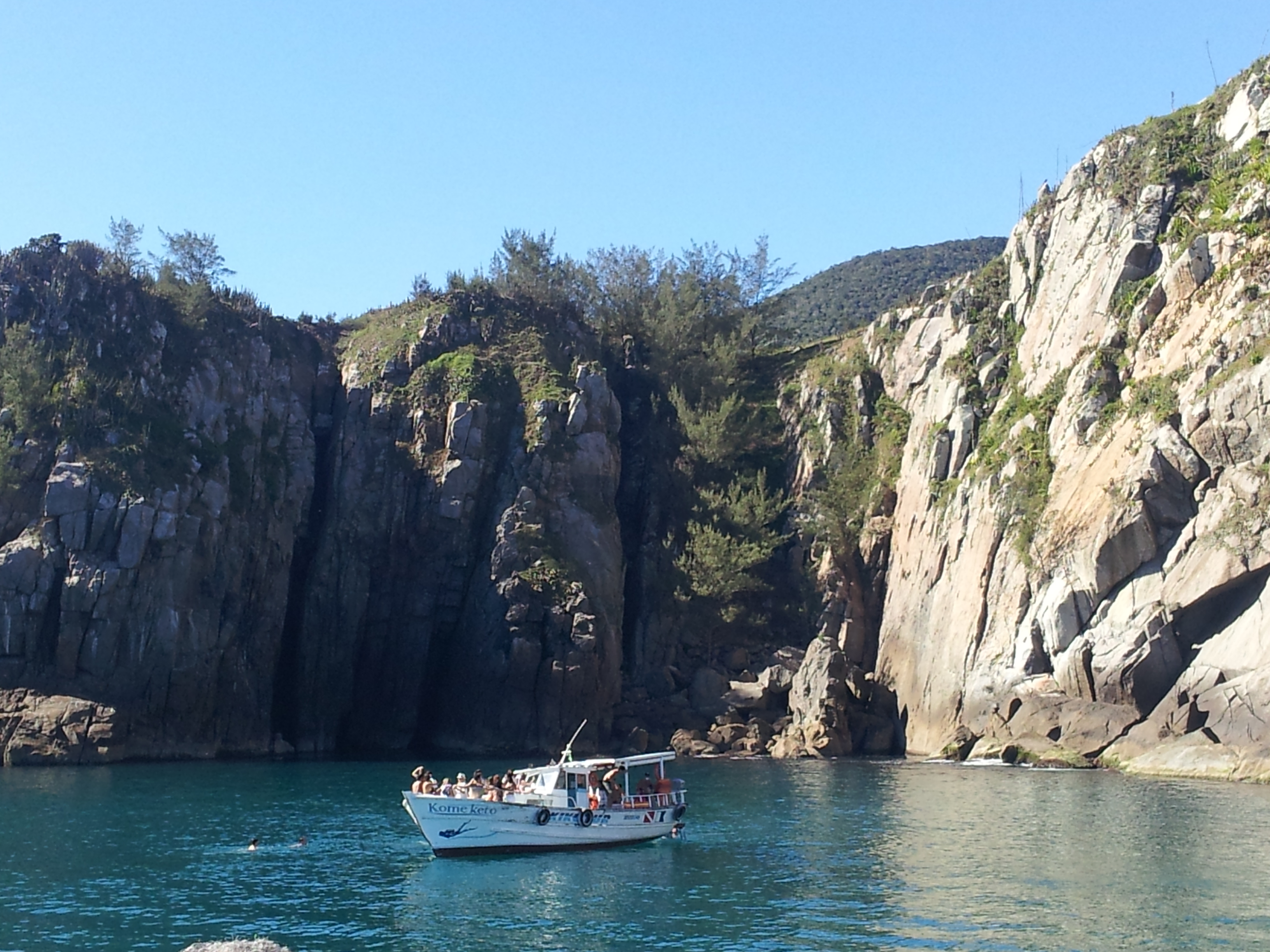
- Arraial do Cabo

- Location within Brazil
- Nearest city: Cabo Frio, Rio de Janeiro
- Coordinates: 22.9372°S 42.1794°W
- Area: 9,840.90 hectares (24,317.4 acres)
- Designation: State park
- Created: 18 April 2011

The Costa do Sol State Park (Portuguese: Parque Estadual da Costa do Sol [ˈpaʁki estɐduˈaw dɐ ˈkɔstɐ du ˈsɔw], Sunshine Coast State Park) is a state park in the state of Rio de Janeiro, Brazil. It protects a number of fragments of coastal areas in the Atlantic Forest biome that are under intense pressure from urban expansion, but that also have considerable tourism potential.

== Location ==
The Costa do Sol State Park has about 9,840.90 hectares (24,317.4 acres) divided into four sectors, each consisting of one or more separate areas. It covers lands in the municipalities of Araruama, Armação dos Búzios, Arraial do Cabo, Cabo Frio, Saquarema and São Pedro da Aldeia as well as parts of the Atlantic Ocean and the Araruama Lagoon in the state Rio de Janeiro. The Costa do Sol State Park is the first mosaic park in Brazil, made up of discontinuous protected areas. In all there are 27 environmental preservation areas.

The unit protects almost all of the remaining natural ecosystems of the Região dos Lagos (Lake Region), which is under intense real estate pressure. More than half of the park is located in the Massambaba Environmental Protection Area, which covers Saquarema, Araruama and Arraial do Cabo. It contains several species in danger of extinction, including the passerine restinga antwren (Formicivora littoralis), rufous-legged owl (Strix rufipes), fluminense swallowtail (Parides ascanius) and skull tree iguana (Liolaemus occipitalis). There are vestiges of sambaquis, where prehistoric hunters and gatherers lived. The Lagoa Vermelha, in Saquarema, contains limestone rocks formed by microorganisms in shallow seas and lagoons, a rare phenomenon that is important in understanding evolutionary history.

The park has considerable tourism potential, although as of 2015 little had been done to ensure that tourists would use the protected sites in a sustainable way. The park rangers had fought 25 fires since the park was created, seized 18 irregular buildings, prevented seven attempts at logging and 12 squatter invasions and seized 15 wild animals. However, the park did not have lodgings for park rangers or a visitor center.

== History ==
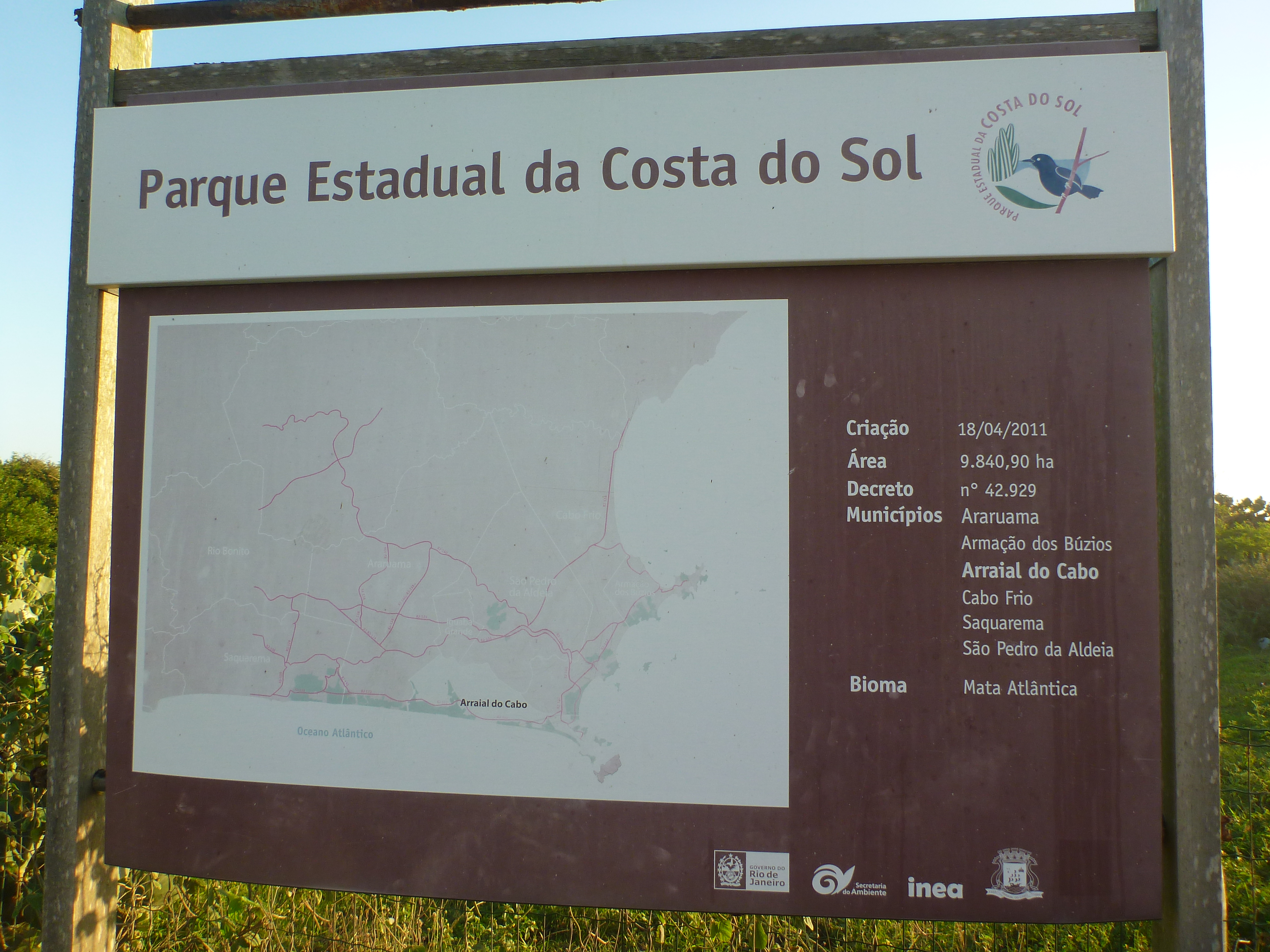
Entrance sign of the park with overview map

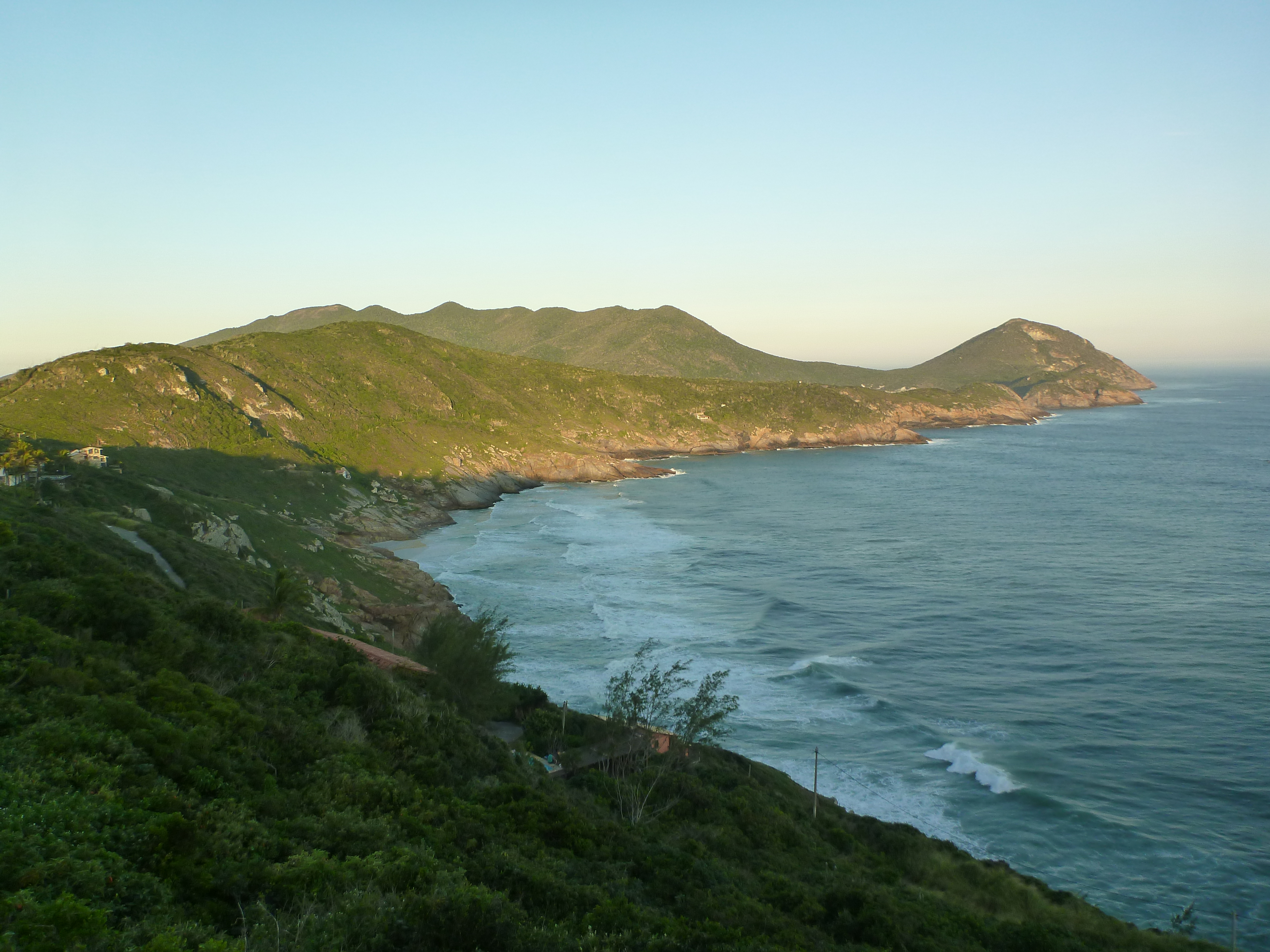
Peninsula Pontal do Atalaia part of the Park

Tourists have visited the area of the park for decades, attracted by the pristine beaches and lagoons, but it was being threatened by unplanned urban growth. The state park was proposed by the Lagos São João Intermunicipal Consortium (CILSJ), a working group with representatives of municipalities, companies and civil society. The Costa do Sol State Park was created by state decree 42.929 of 18 April 2011 with an area of about 9,841 hectares (24,320 acres). The park was created in a ceremony in Búzios attended by federal Environmental Minister Carlos Minc and state governor Sérgio Cabral Filho.

The objectives are to ensure preservation of remnants of Atlantic Forest and associate ecosystems of the coastal region, including restingas, mangroves, lagoons and swamps, to allow degraded areas to recover, to maintain populations of native fauna and flora as a refuge for rare, endemic or endangered species, to support recreation, education, scientific research, leisure and tourism, and to support sustainable economic activities in the park's surroundings.

In April 2015 the park promoted an annual promotion at Conchas Beach in Cabo Frio to encourage tourism and conservation in the park. The program included an ecological race, stand-up paddle challenge, a workshop on reuse and customization of crates, garbage collection, interpretive tour and a music show. All the garbage was to be made into a sculpture.

== Sources ==
- Araújo, Paulo Roberto (16 April 2015), Parque da Costa do Sol, na Região dos Lagos, completa quatro anos com áreas desprotegidas (in Portuguese), Infoglobo Comunicação e Participações
- "Parque Costa do Sol em Cabo Frio, RJ, recebe evento de aniversário", G1 Globo (in Portuguese), 16 April 2015
- Parque Estadual da Costa do Sol (in Portuguese), INEA: Instituto Estadual do Ambiente
- "Parque Estadual da Costa do Sol torna-se finalmente uma realidade", Voz das Aguas (in Portuguese), Comitê da Bacia Hidrográfica Lagos São João (CBHLSJ), 4 May 2011, archived from the original on 16 August 2017
- Saldanha, Paula (April 2011), Parque Estadual da Costa do Sol (in Portuguese), TV Brasil
