= Araruama =

- Municipality
- Município de Araruama
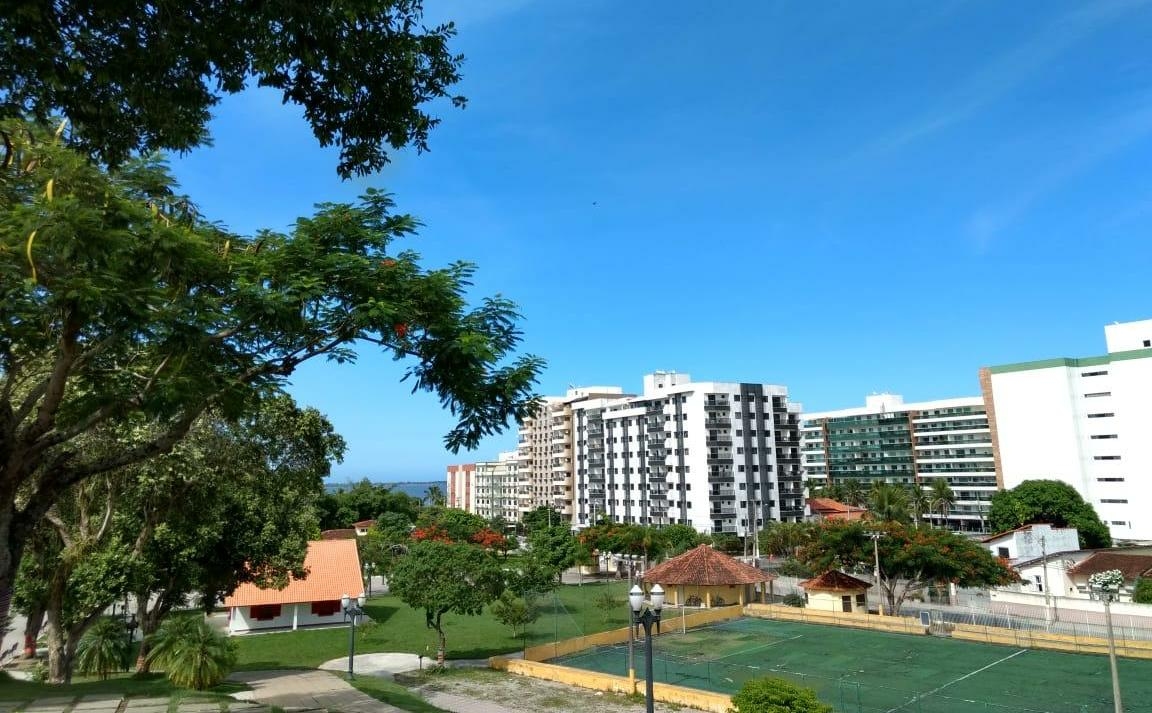

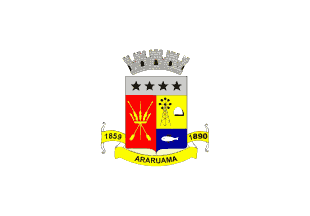
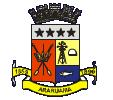
- Flag Coat of arms

- Localization in Rio de Janeiro

- Localization in Brazil
- Coordinates: 22°52′22″S 42°20′34″W
- Country: Brazil
- Lakes Region: Southeast
- Founded: February 6, 1859

Government
  - Body: Prefeitura da Cidade de Araruama
  - Mayor: Lívia de Chiquinho (PDT - 2017-2020)

Area
  - Total: 633.795 km^{2} (244.710 sq mi)
- Elevation: 15 m (49 ft)

Population (2022 Census)
  - Total: 129,671
  - Estimate (2025): 137,906
- Demonym: Araruamense
- Time zone: UTC−3 (BRT)
- Area code: +55 22
- Website: Official Araruama website

Araruama (Portuguese pronunciation: [ɐɾɐɾuˈɐmɐ]) is a municipality in the state of Rio de Janeiro, Brazil. Located at 22°52'22" of latitude South and 42°20'35" of longitude west, at an altitude of fifty feet. In 2020, its population was 134,293 inhabitants, which places it the second largest population in the Região dos Lagos.

The municipality of Araruama extends over an area of 635.4 km ², marked by plain if some lakes, including the Araruama Lagoon and the Pond Juturnaíba, situated between the municipalities Araruama and Silva Jardim. Geographically it is the largest town in the Região dos Lagos.

Its main geographic feature is a large bay by the same name. Araruama has a large area of Atlantic Forest in between the sea shore and the Araruama Lagoon that belongs to the Costa do Sol State Park.

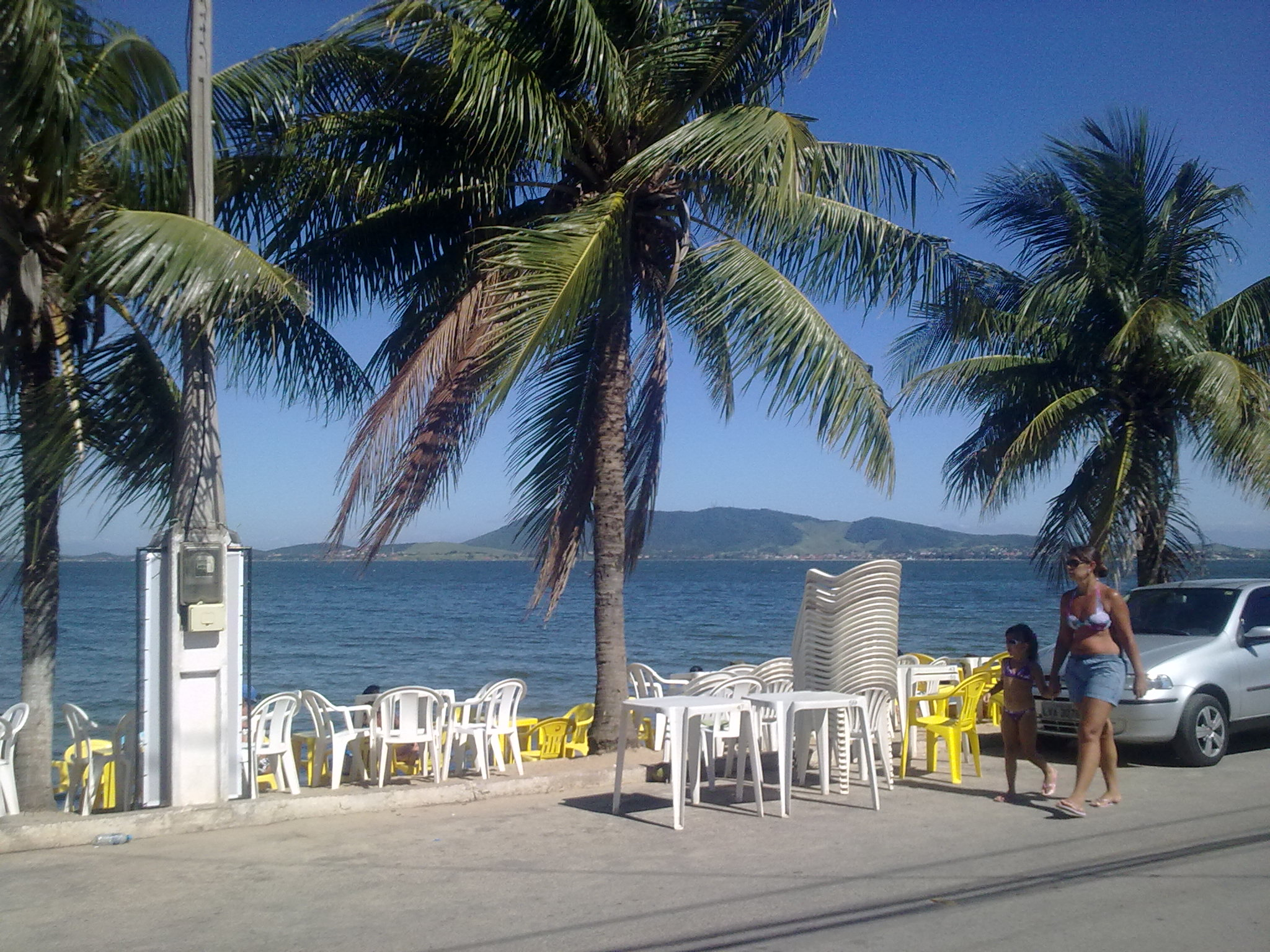
Edge of Iguabinha

== Etymology ==
According to Tupi language scholar Eduardo Navarro, the word *Araruama* derives from *arara* + *'y* + *'u* + *-aba*, meaning "place where macaws drink water," in reference to the Araruama Lagoon.

== Economy ==
The municipality of Araruama economy is growing enough and varied such as:

Tourist - representing a large percentage of districts mainly by economic and Iguabinha Praia Seca, however in recent years tourism has been growing rapidly in Araruama with Buzios and River Oysters, attracting thousands of tourists and visitors to the most beautiful and varied beaches around the State. The number of hotels and inns in Araruama has increased since 2010.

Industrial - salt is quite abundant in Araruama (extracted mainly in the district of Praia Seca is one of the largest in the entire state and the entire country), so the main industries are focused on it, is extremely good for the city because it generates little or no pollution, keeping the whole balance and ecosystem of the region. Construction industries have also been installed in Araruama. Among them, there is the East Building, one of the largest in the state of Rio and headquartered in the city. Processing industries also generate numerous jobs in the city and are situated in Industrial Condominium Araruama the shores of RJ 124.

Rural - planted and grown in the districts of Saint Vincent and the Morro Grande, representing the lowest percentage of the city's economy, has its cultivation such as banana, passion fruit, aipim, coco, tangerine, lemon and orange. Even with a reduction in production, Araruama remains the largest producer of citrus in the state of Rio de Janeiro.

Fishing - on behalf of all the neighborhoods around the pond Araruama that has small fish or seafood such as croaker, shrimp, mullet, sardines and some other seafood can be found in the lagoon, is also a small percentage in economy, however much of this percentage is the Municipal Market Araruama - also known as Fish Market (which was recently renovated by the city). There can be found a wide variety of seafood, crustaceans and fish.

Commercial - mainly stands for Center Araruama and Amaral Peixoto Highway, the various buildings and buildings such as banks, higher education, many Shops, Fast Foods, Malls, Dealers, Squares, Bars, pubs, restaurants, supermarkets, parking lots, fairs etc.. Currently, the districts of Villa Capri, Iguabinha, Banana, Parati Beach and bearded, in the vicinity of Highway Amaral Peixoto are the fastest growing in the city, economically and populacionalmente.

Real Estate Industry - Araruama is currently the fastest-growing, values and develops throughout the Lakes Region, account for why the population grows very fast and high demand for apartments near the beach has grown much interest in construction for Araruama, gradually becoming the Principal City of the Lakes Region. This is due to the centrality of the municipality in the geographical map of the state: Araruama is just over an hour from the city of Rio and Niterói. The same time it takes you to the city of Macae. It is worth mentioning also the city's proximity to the COMPERJ (Petrochemical Complex of the State of Rio de Janeiro), greater public investment underway in Brazil. Araruama to the pole, it takes 45 minutes. Currently the city invests in attracting future workers COMPERJ to become residents of Araruama.

== History ==
The municipality of Araruama was occupied intensively by Indigenous Tupinambás, gardeners and potters populations of Amazonian origin, striking presence that left their villages since precolonial times. Urns, painted bowls, plus a wide variety of utilitarian ceramic forms are examples of what can be found in different archaeological sites in the region. The villages have researched, Morro Grande, in particular, dated 2200 years, are among the oldest occupations in this group Tupi in Brazil.

The site that currently corresponds to the municipality of Araruama integrated the captaincy of São Vicente, donated to Martim Afonso de Sousa, still in colonial Brazil (1534), but the first news about the occupation of the territory were given in 1575 by the expedition of the governor of captaincy of Rio de Janeiro, Antonio Salema, who went to Cabo Frio and that decimated hundreds of French and Indigenous.

The records on the territory of Araruama dating from 1615, as a result of the foundation of the present city of Cabo Frio, which came to promote recognition of the São João River and Lagoon Araruama.

In 1626, the land encompassed by the Araruama sesmarias donated to Manuel Riscado which implemented a sawmill using Brazil wood and other hardwoods.

Through the edict of January 10, 1799, created the parish of San Sebastian Araruama, which belonged to the municipality of Cabo Frio until 1852, when, by Provincial Law No. 628, became part of the municipality of Saquarema.

On February 6, 1859, the parish of San Sebastian Araruama was elevated to a town of Araruama due to the extinction of the Village of Saquarema. The elevation of Araruama to city occurred on January 22, 1890, by decree of Governor Francis Portela.

"Park Hotel" which gives its name to the neighborhood, is a historic building at the top of the current Praça João Hélio (pictured), and today houses a unit of Faetec offering technical courses in Tourism and Hospitality. It was inaugurated by President Getúlio Vargas as hotel and casino in 1943, and worked well until 1946, when the game was banned in Brazil. We remained until the end of the 1990s, leaving few years left to turn into Faetec.

The anthem of the city of Araruama was incorporated into the city's history in 1999 by composer Pedro Paulo Pessoa Pinto.

Currently, the city is known throughout the state of Rio de Janeiro for its commercial vocation, and especially by its tourist vocation soon after the construction of the lakes, Araruama underwent a process of great tourist abandonment, but in recent years has growing and rapidly recovering, even more than in the past. Tourists are attracted by the beaches, especially the ocean, bathed by the crystalline waters of the Atlantic. Are also attractive plazas, parks, centers of gastronomy and entertainment centers.

== Hydrography ==
Araruama has the largest variety and diversity of beaches throughout the Lakes Region, both the lagoon (lapped by calm, warm waters of the Araruama Lagoon), the ocean (lapped by the blue waters of the icy Atlantic Ocean). The city's main beaches are: Hawk Beach, - calm beach and warm. Belongs to Araruama Lagoon. Bearded Beach, - quiet beach, shallow and great for swimming. Belongs to Araruama Lagoon. Beach Hospice; - calm beach clean and good for fishing and boating. Belongs to Araruama Lagoon. Beach Pontinha; - widely great beach, deserted, with bike and paving; excellent for hiking. Belongs to Araruama Lagoon. Praia dos Amores; - small beach and very nice. Belongs to Araruama Lagoon. Beach Massambaba; - good beach for boating, boat or even yachts. Belongs to Araruama Lagoon. Beach Coqueiral. - Good for beach fishing or bathing. Belongs to Araruama Lagoon. Iguabinha Beach - great beach for swimming with calm waters, white sand and fresh. Belongs to Araruama Lagoon. Tooth Beach - busy beach with many waves, ideal for surfing and bathing. Ocean beach. Praia Seca - busy beach with much ice and waves, ideal for swimming, surfing and other water sports. Ocean Beach. Beach Pernambuca; - busy beach, but who comes in when formed pools ideal for children. Ocean beach. Beach Vargas; - ocean beach most famous and visited Araruama. It has a good infrastructure.

== Parks and Squares ==
- Park João Hélio
- Square Bible
- Square School
- Event Square
- Exhibition Park
- Park Antônio Raposo
- Flag Square
- Park San Vicente
- Square Mataruna
- Sports Center Bearded

The Araruama Lagoon is characterized by its high salinity (one of the largest in the world), and its warm waters, ideal for swimming in any season. In recent years, the pond has been recovered from a major pollution occurred due to breakthrough in Araruama estate and lack of environmental awareness of many locals and tourists. Lately, we see the lagoon recovering its crystal blue waters that were once its main icon. Also it is possible to bathe in its waters again.

== Slogans ==
- Praia Seca: The Brazilian Cancún
- Araruama: Where the sun breaks through the winter
- Araruama: City quality of life

== Tourism ==
The city of Araruama receives thousands of tourists every year looking for Beaches Fine pond Rest hotels and B, Parks, Places, Events and more; Mainly on: December and January (due to the celebration of Christmas and New Year) and February (due to the celebration of the Carnival).

== Sports ==
Araruama Lagoon is a flat water salt lagoon, and excellent spot for practicing water sports due to its constant winds and lack of obstacles. You can practice water sports almost all year long, with winds averaging 12 to 25 knots.

In 2010, Araruama hosted the Rio Worlds Windsurf Championship.
