= Giraffes at BioParque do Rio Case =

2021 incident at a zoo in Brazil

- Date: November 2021
- Duration: November 2021 - current affairs
- Location: Portobello Resort & Safari
- Theme: Environmental crime
- Participants: BioParque do Rio, IBAMA, Public Ministry, Federal Police of Brazil
- Deaths: 3 giraffes
- Injuries: 15 giraffes
- Accused: Cataratas Group
- Website: https://girafas.bioparquedorio.com.br/

In November 2021 BioParque do Rio, a zoo in Rio de Janeiro, imported 18 giraffes. The purchase of giraffes was the largest import of large animals ever made in Brazil. However, on December 14, the giraffes were sunning themselves in an outdoor area when six giraffes broke through the fence and managed to escape. All were recaptured, but three of them died a few hours later. A report made by veterinarians hired by BioParque pointed out that the cause of the giraffes' deaths was myopathy, a condition that can be provoked by stress.

== Context ==
In Brazil, there were 17 giraffes in the country in 2021 and the group of then 18 new giraffes was part of a conservation project. Upon arrival in Brazil, the giraffes were taken to the Portobello Resort & Safári, in Mangaratiba, in an area far from the city on the Costa Verde.

== Controversies ==
After the death of the three giraffes, environmentalists who visited the site denounced that it was small and unsuitable for the animals. Police arrested two men on Wednesday for "ill-treatment", although BioParque denies ill-treatment. On January 26, the Federal Police seized the remaining 15 giraffes at the Portobello Resort & Safári, where the animals are located and found mistreatment. Thus, not only should the giraffes' housing conditions be examined, but also how they were imported and whether their importation was legal, since the International Union for Conservation of Nature (IUCN) classifies giraffes as "Vulnerable".

Both Ibama and the Federal Police who were there today [January 26, 2022] characterized that giraffe situation as a crime of mistreatment. For these reasons, those responsible for the Cataratas Group were taken to the Federal Police.

— Sergio Suiama, "Public Prosecutor",

In a later analysis of the documentation for importing the animals, it was found that in the license issued by Ibama, all giraffes received the same code: "w", from "wild". This code was created by an international convention that classifies the origin of animals – and "w" means "animals taken from nature", which would make importation illegal, since Ibama prohibits the importation of animals taken from nature. In this context, the Public Ministry of Brazil now wants the giraffes to be returned to their original context in South Africa.

In an official note, BioParque do Rio reiterates its "responsibility with the management of fauna, with long-term nature restoration projects and claims that there is no mistreatment as they try to suggest in unfounded accusations. Giraffes are adapting to an environment prepared for your needs and approved by the competent bodies". The institution also states, at the end of the note, that it deeply regrets what happened.
