= São Pedro da Aldeia =

- Municipality
- Municipality of São Pedro da Aldeia
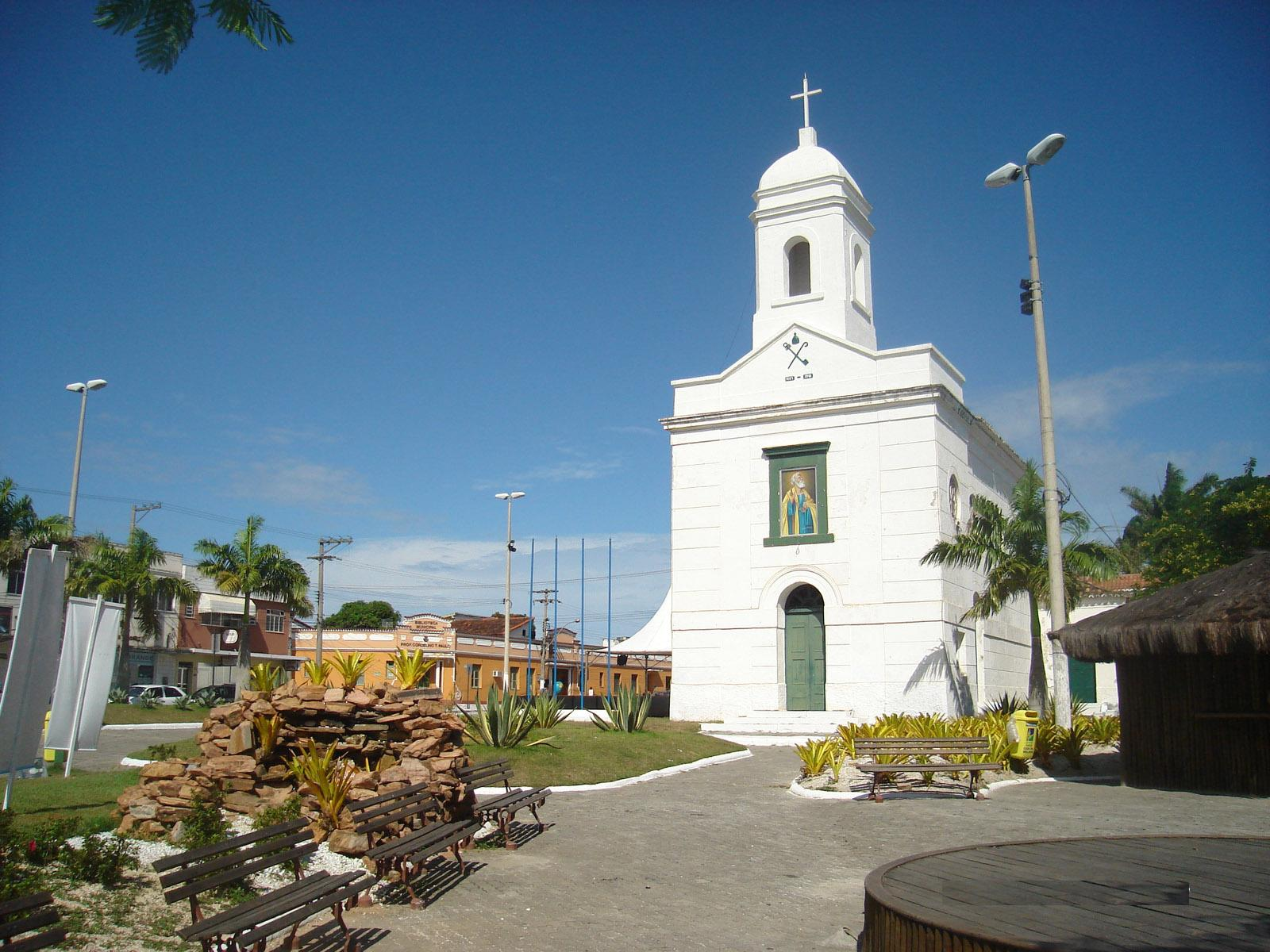
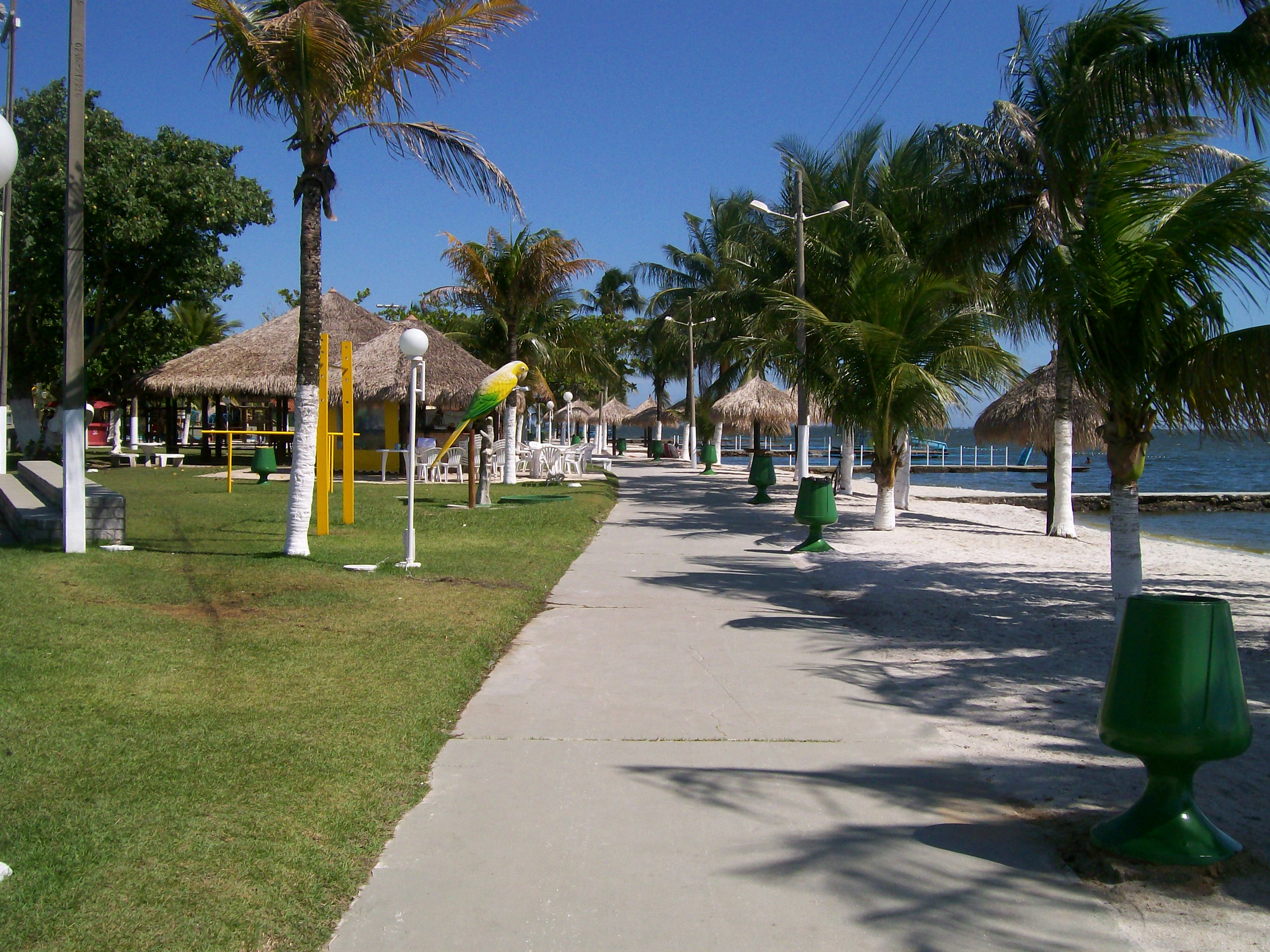
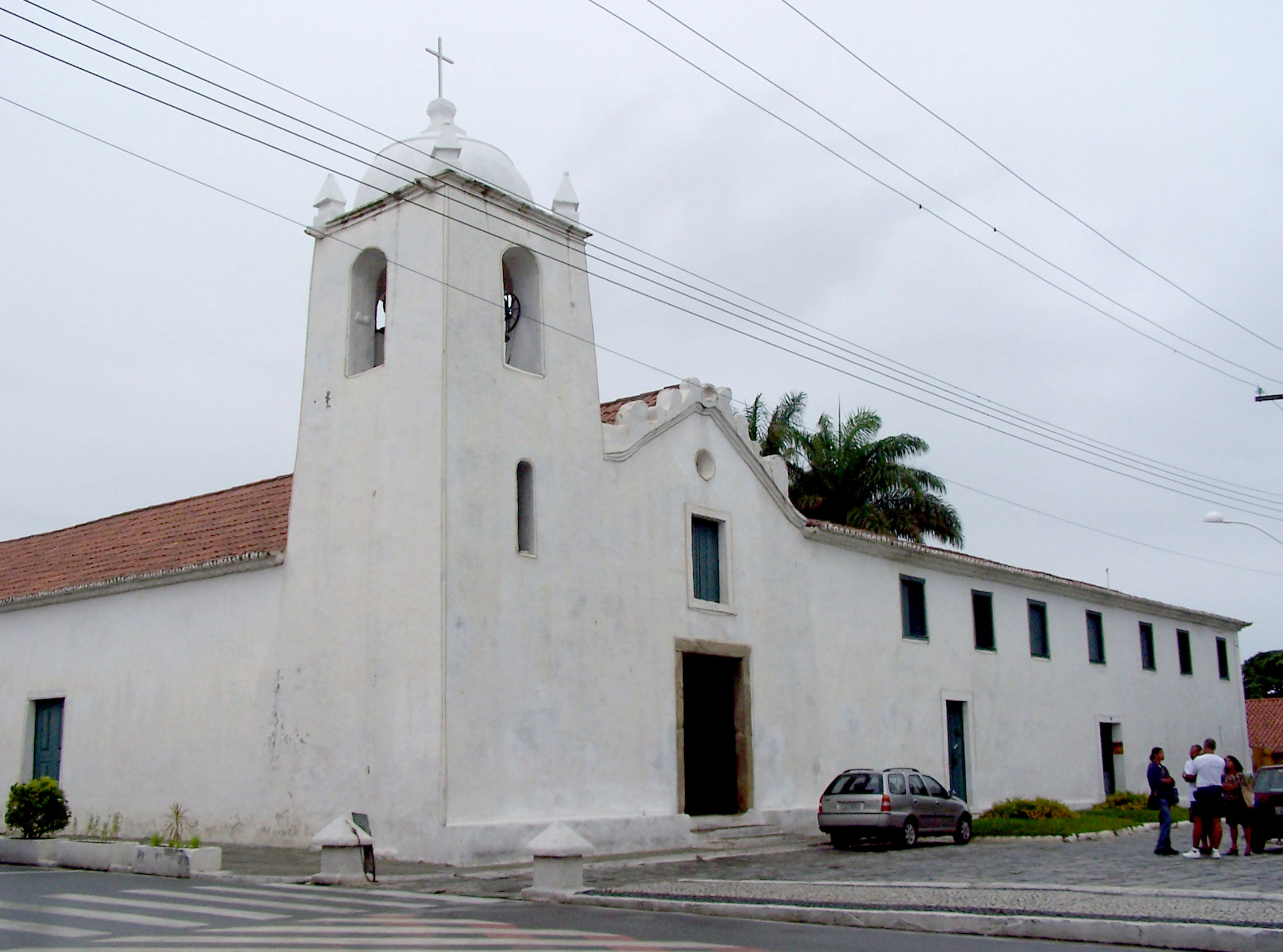
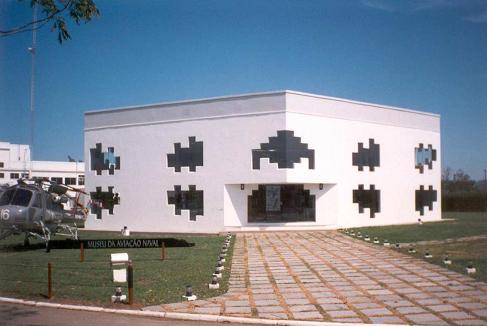
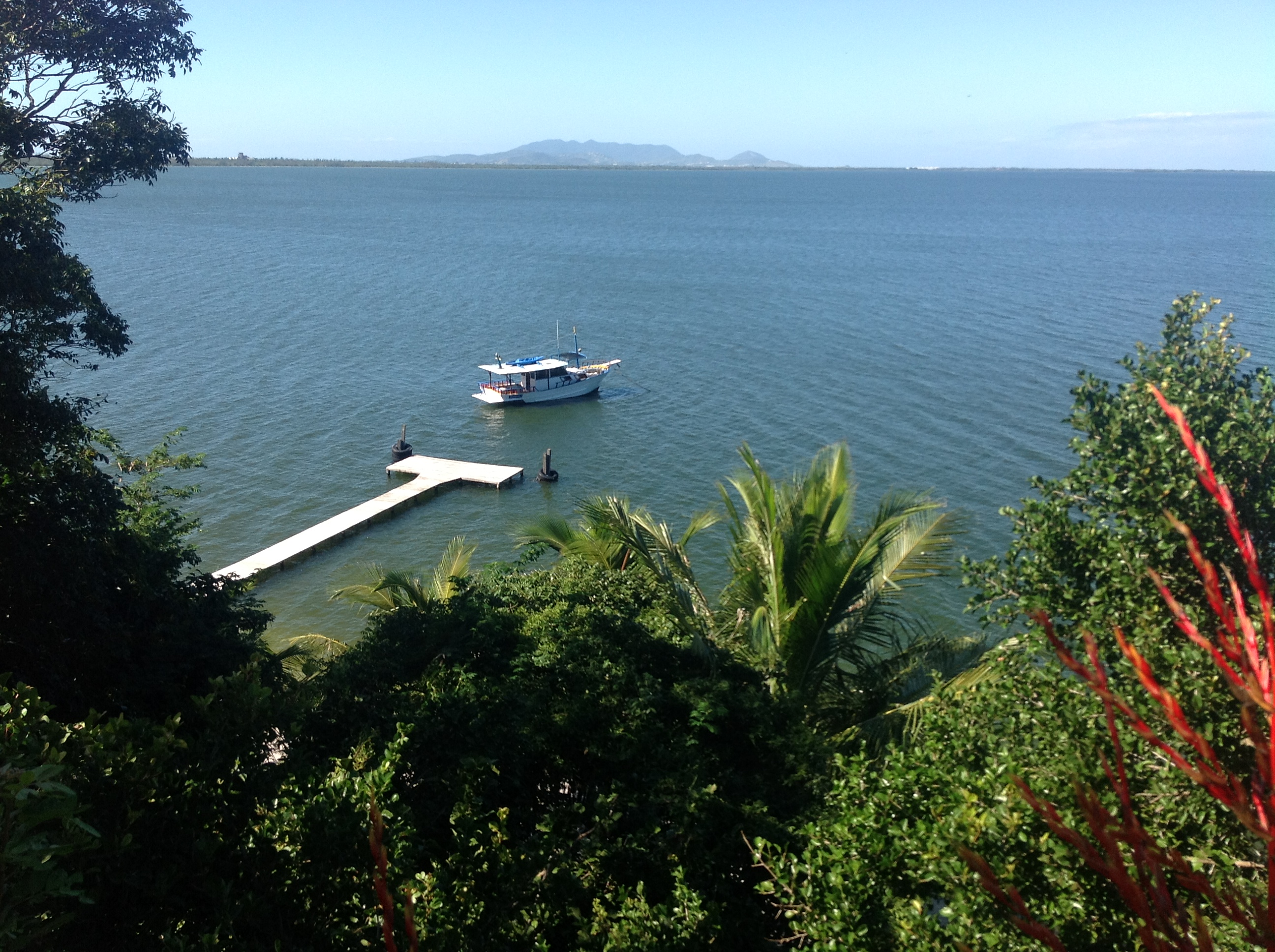
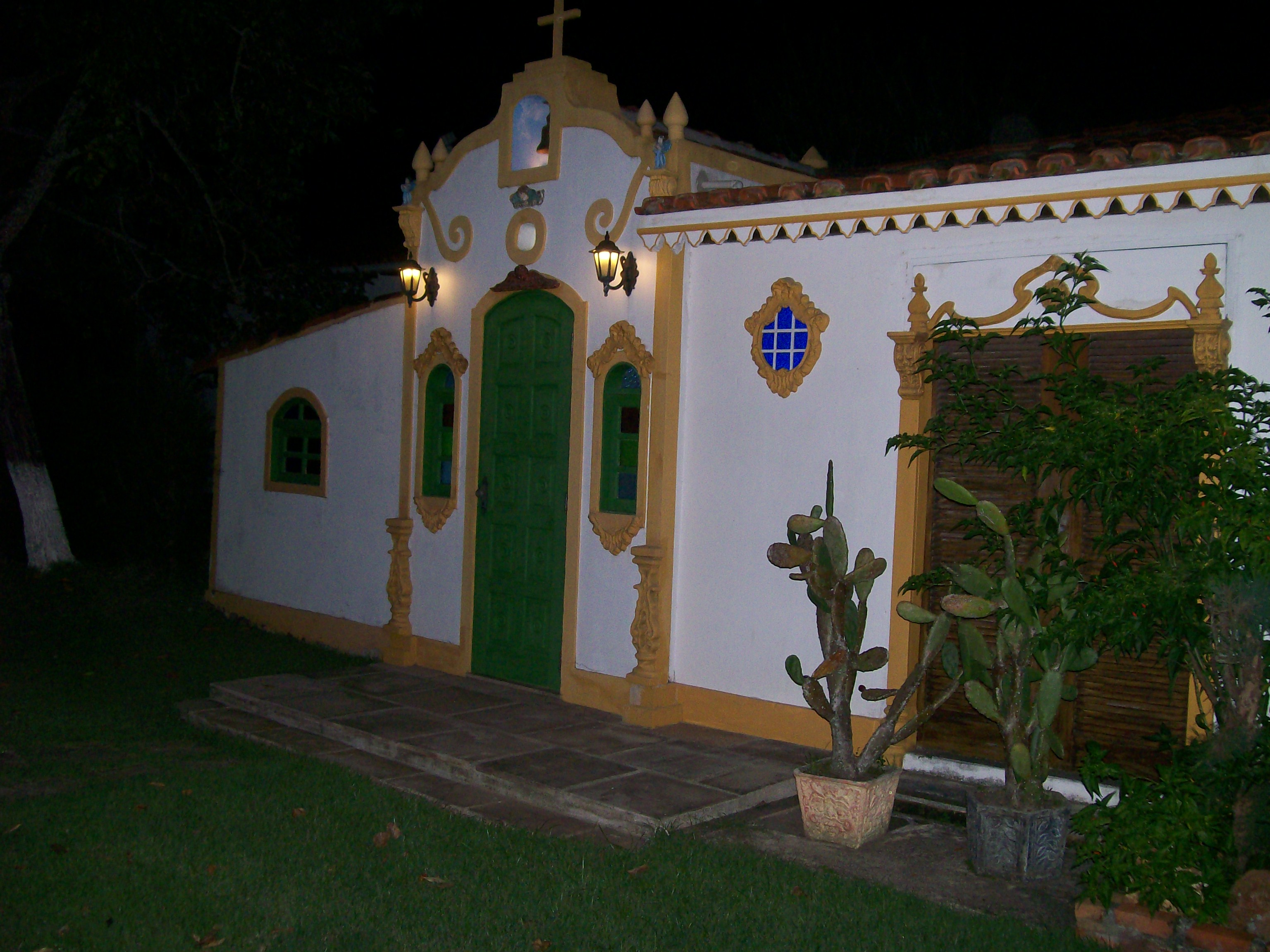

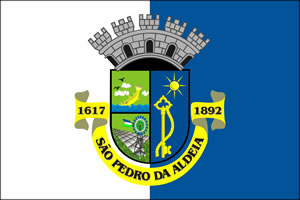
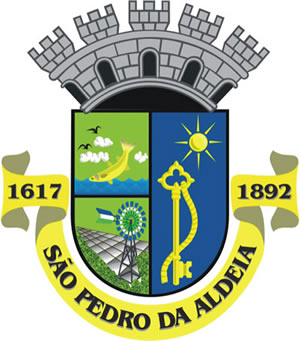
- Flag Coat of arms

- Location in the Rio de Janeiro

- Location in Brazil
- Coordinates: 22°50′20″S 42°06′10″W
- Country: Brazil
- Region: Southeast
- State: Rio de Janeiro
- Founded: 16 May 1617

Population (2022 Census)
  - Total: 104,029
  - Estimate (2025): 110,677
- Demonym: aldeense
- Time zone: UTC−3 (BRT)
- Postal Code: 28.940-000
- Area code: 22
- HDI (2010): 0.712 – high
- Website: pmspa.rj.gov.br

São Pedro da Aldeia (Saint Peter of the Village) (Portuguese pronunciation: [sɐ̃w ˈpedɾu dɐwˈdejɐ]) is a municipality in Brazil. Its population was 104,029 (2022 Census) and its area is 332 km^{2}.

== Geography ==
It lies in the east of Rio de Janeiro State on the Araruama Lagoon, 120 km from the state capital, Rio de Janeiro. The Araruama lagoon is the largest hypersaline lagoon in the world. Sports like windsurfing, kitesurfing and others like these are common because of the wind force in São Pedro da Aldeia

== Economy ==
Salt extraction and fishing from the Araruama Lagoon are the two most important industries.

== History ==
São Pedro da Aldeia was founded in 1660 by Catholic priests on the top of a hill named after Saint Peter, in honor of whom the city was named. A chapel was built that was later replaced by an architecturally significant church. Nowadays it is the main historical monument in the town and is protected by state laws. Some colonial buildings and landmarks remain today, such as the cemetery beside the church, where the family graves of the founders of the town remain. In the 1960s the Brazilian Air Force and Navy built a military airport there, bringing many migrants from others parts of the country and increasing the town's population.
