= Rio das Ostras =

- Municipality
- Municipality of Rio das Ostras
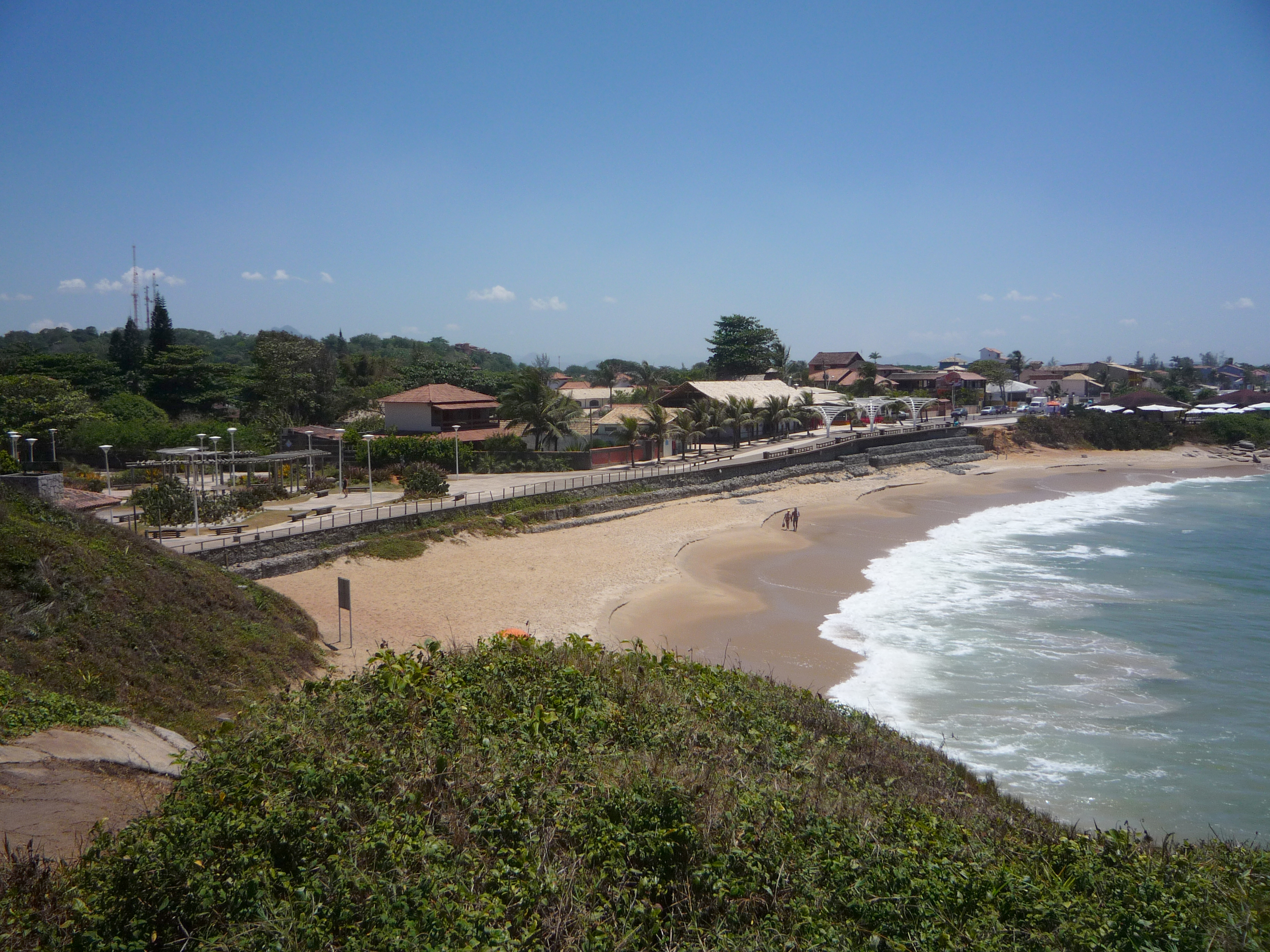
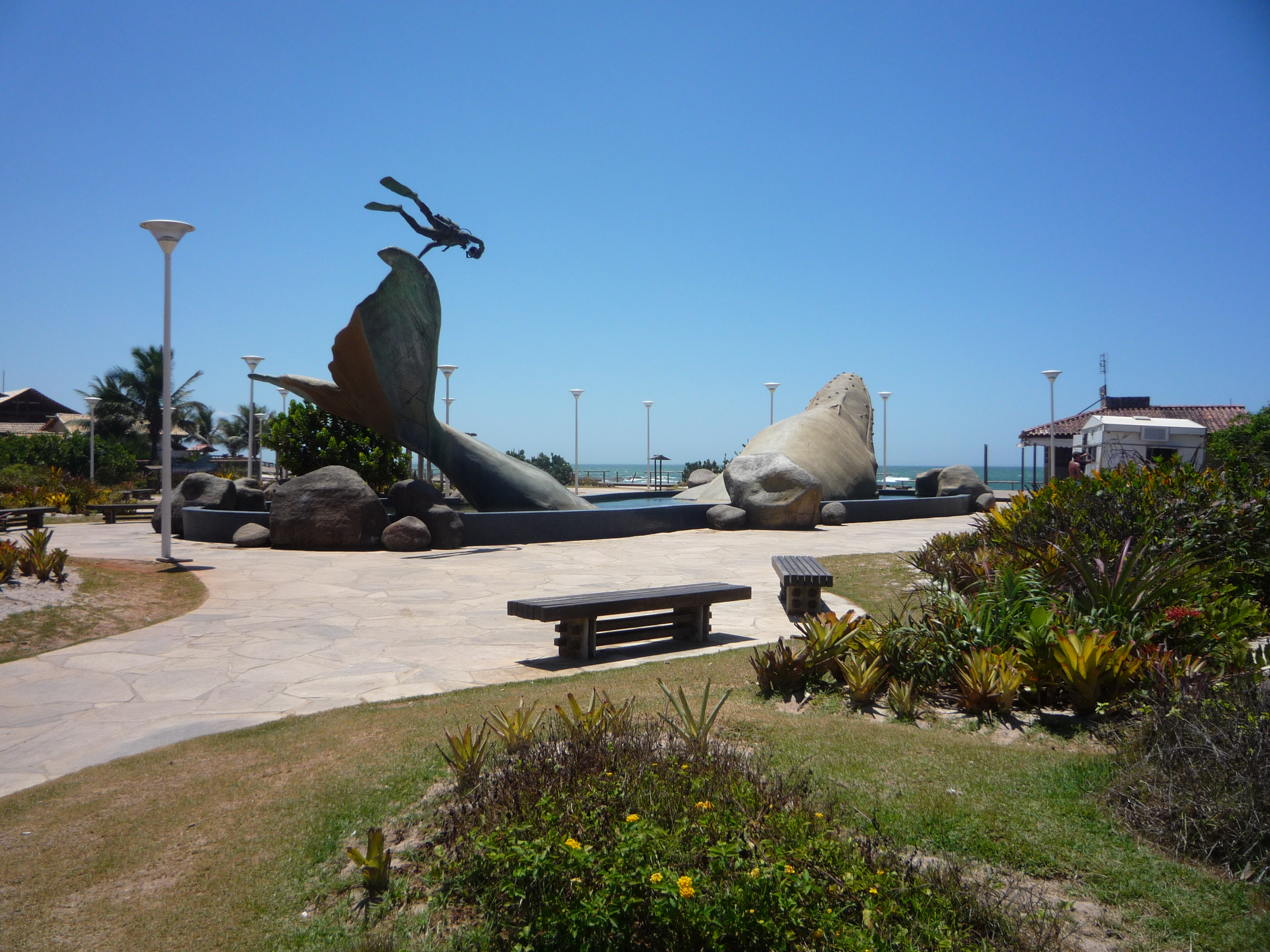
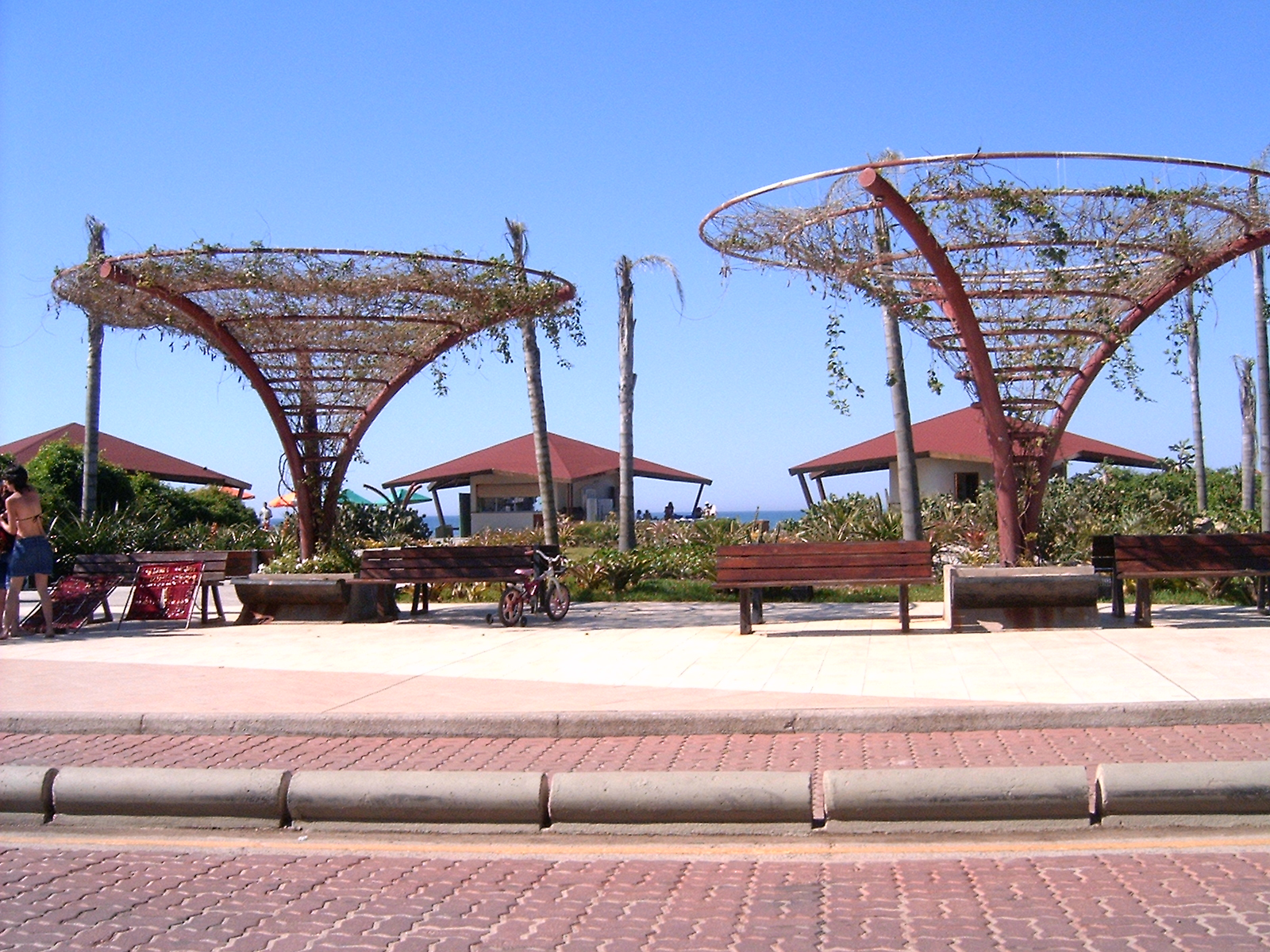
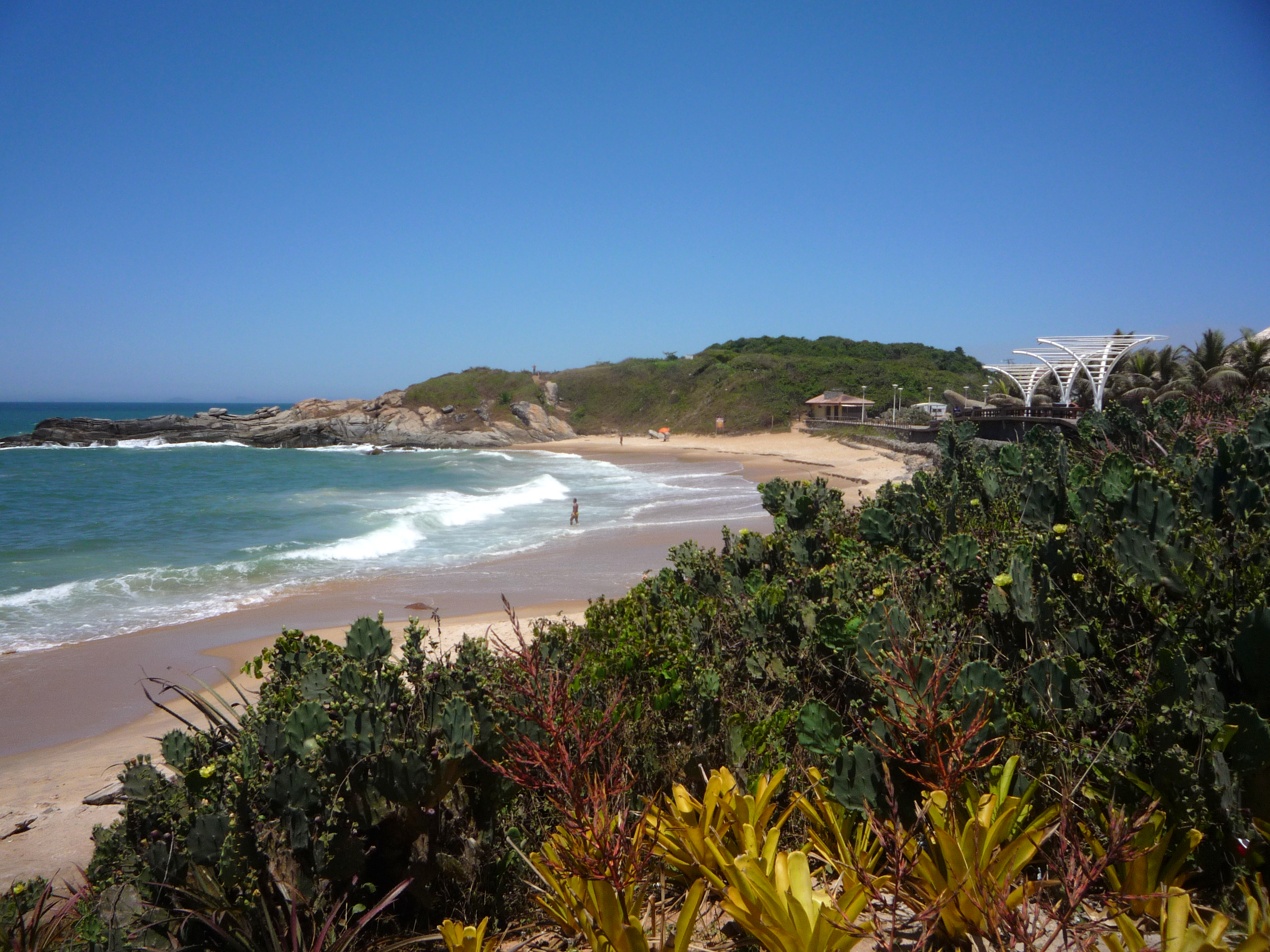
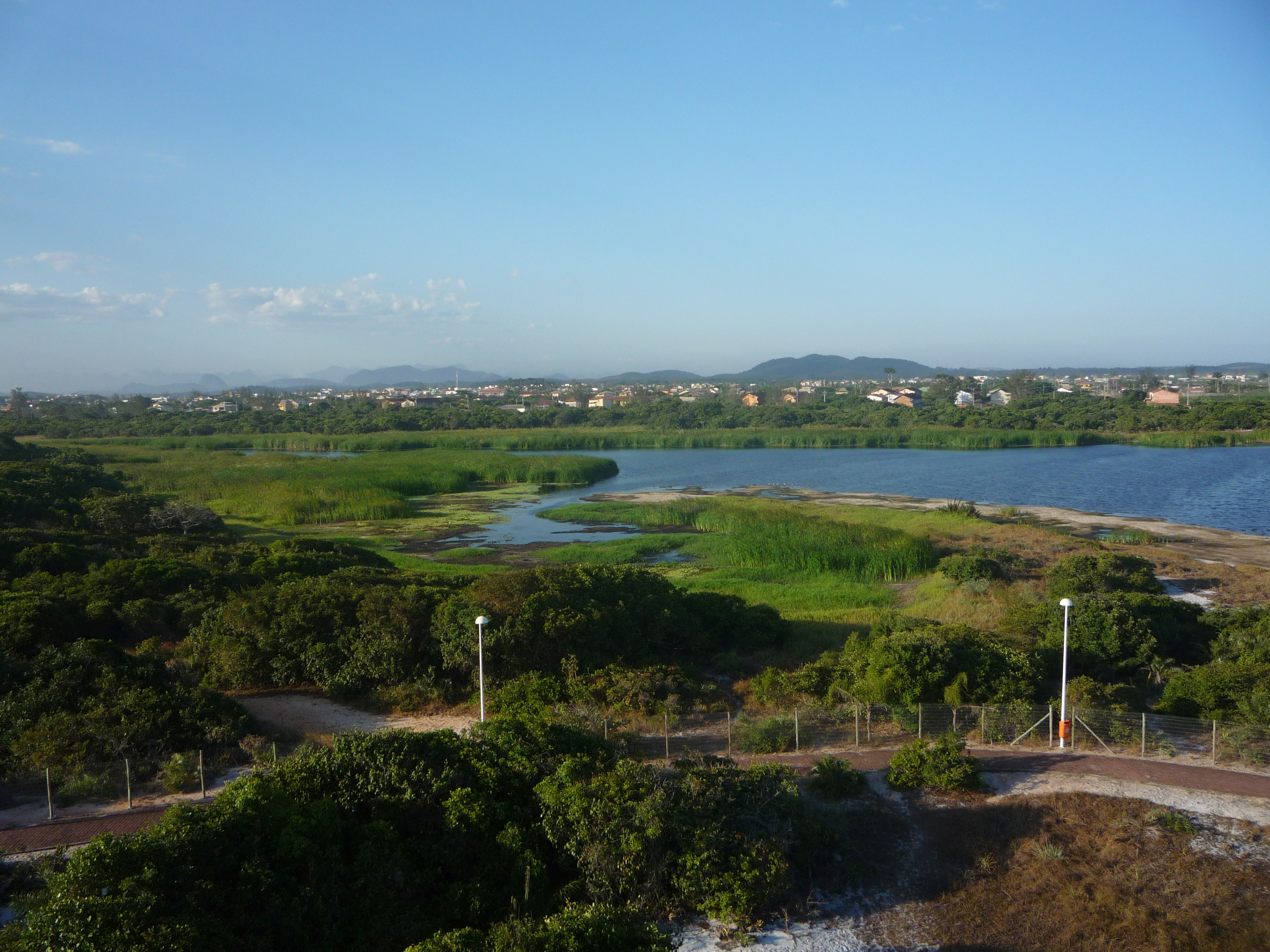
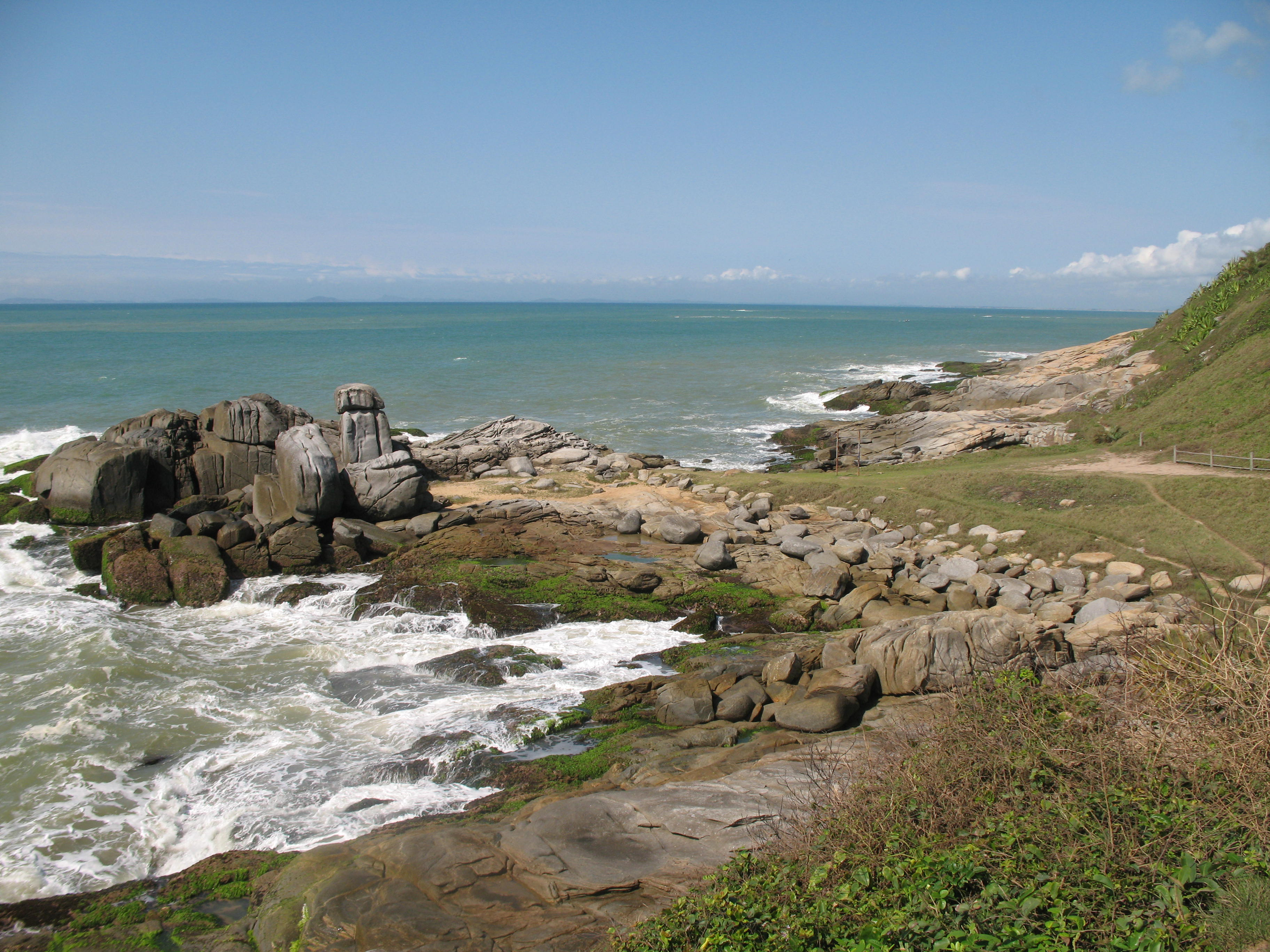

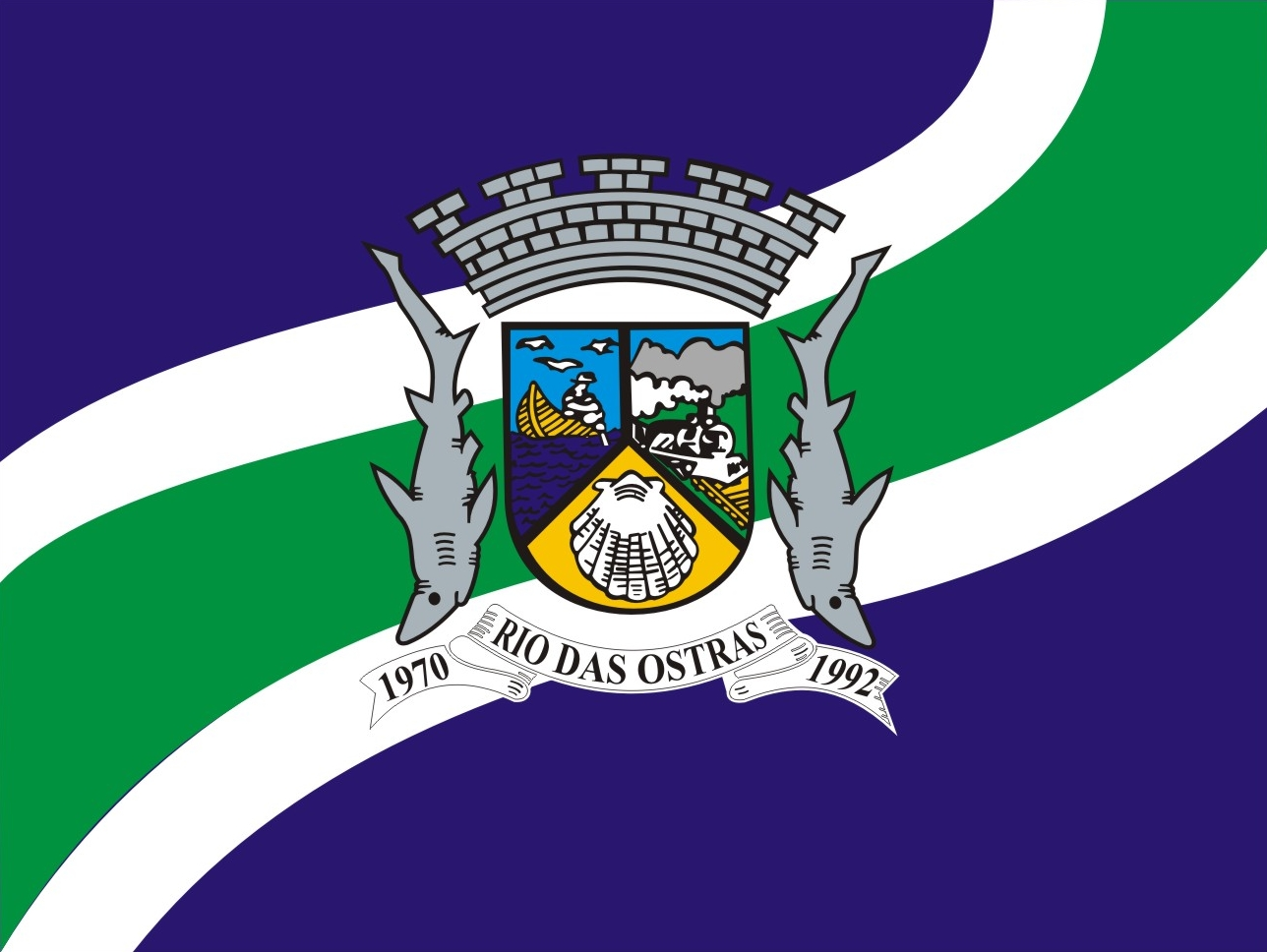
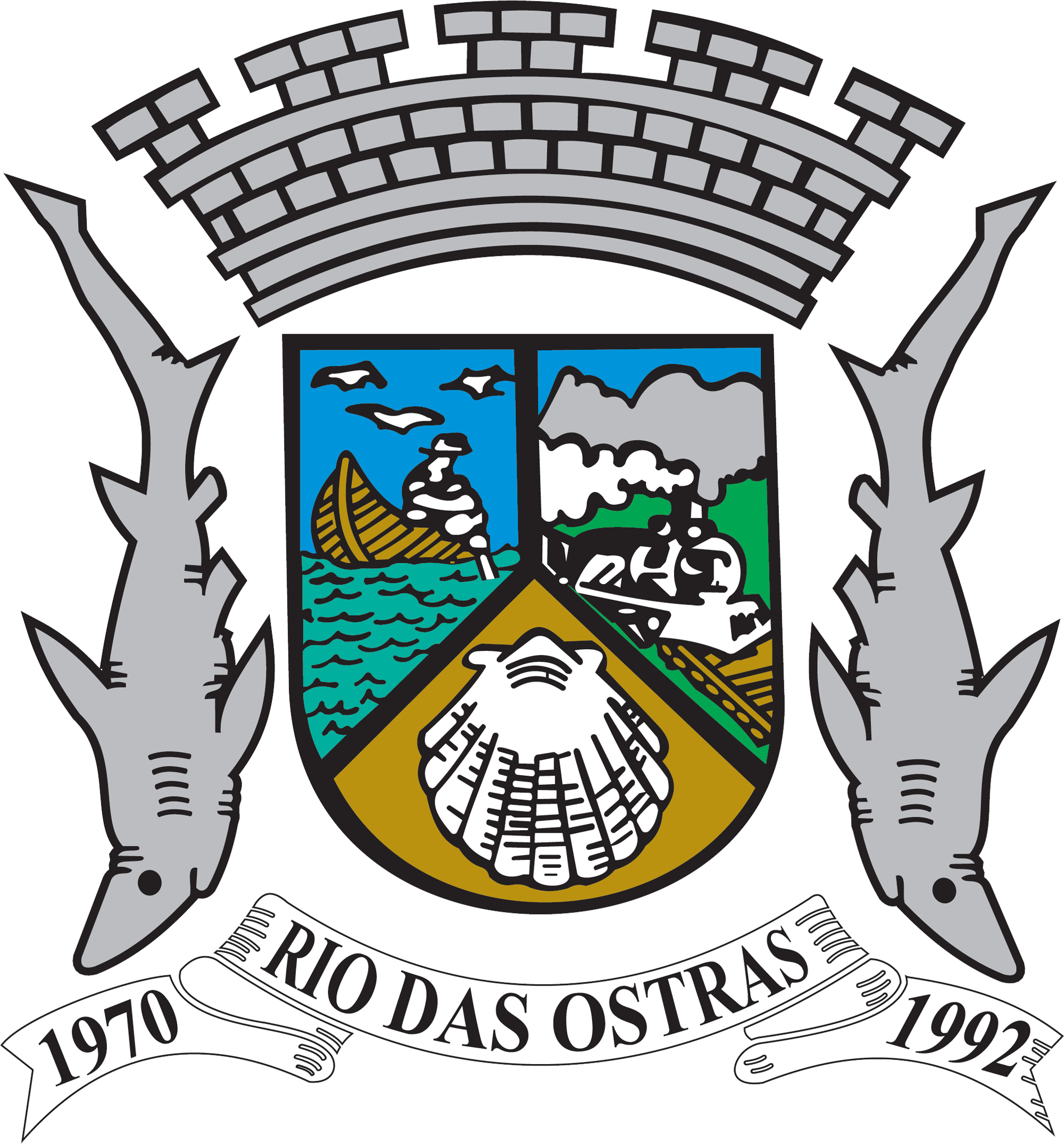
- Flag Coat of arms

- Location in Rio de Janeiro
- Coordinates: 22°31′37″S 41°56′42″W
- Country: Brazil
- Region: Southeast
- State: Rio de Janeiro

Government
  - Mayor: Carlos Augusto Balthazar (PL)

Area
  - Total: 228.044 km^{2} (88.048 sq mi)
- Elevation: 4 m (13 ft)

Population (2022 Census)
  - Total: 156,491
  - Estimate (2025): 168,455
  - Density: 686.232/km^{2} (1,777.33/sq mi)
- Time zone: UTC−3 (BRT)
- HDI (2010): 0.773 – high
- Website: riodasostras.rj.gov.br

Rio das Ostras (Portuguese pronunciation: [ˈʁi.u dɐz ˈostɾɐs], lit. "River of Oysters") is a municipality located in the Brazilian state of Rio de Janeiro. Its population is 156,491 (2022 Census) and its area is 228 km^{2} (88 sq mi).

== Beaches ==
The most popular beaches are: Praia da Tartaruga, Praia do Centro, Praia do Bosque e Costa Azul. One of the most visited spots in the city is the Praça da Baleia, the end of the beach of Costa Azul. In this square, there is a statue of Humpback whale carved bronze. Its 15 beaches enchant the preservation and infrastructure.

Praia do Abricó: First Beach of the Rio das Ostras from the city of Rio de Janeiro.

Praia da Tartaruga: Located in a small cove, located between the beaches Abricó and Bosque, so named by the incidence of turtles on site.

Praia do Bosque: Situated between the beaches Centro and Tartaruga stand out for leafy trees that resemble a forest.

Praia do Centro

Praia do Cemitério: Very close to the City Centre.

Praia da Boca da Barra: Beach from the mouth of the river Rio das Ostras. Has infrastructure kiosks and restaurants and has undergone a process of revitalization. Praia da Joana: Small beach with rocky headlands.

Praia Virgem

Praia das Areias Negras: Beach horseshoe shaped. The name is due to the darker color of the sand, with large amounts of monazite. Praia do Remanso: Next to the Praça da Baleia is a sandy cove formed by rocks. Has infrastructure and is frequented by families with children.

Praia de Costazul

Praia Enseada das Gaivotas: One of the quietest beaches of the Rio das Ostras.

Praia de Itapebussus: Away from the city center.

Praia do Mar do Norte: Beach nearest the city of Macaé, known for its cliffs and preserved by salt marsh vegetation. Praia das Pedrinhas

== Problems ==
The municipality has been suffering from environmental impacts on account of the pollution of beaches, rivers and lagoons due to a lack of basic sanitation and environmental degradation as a consequence of illegal occupations in areas of environmental protection (APAs) for the protection and conservation of biotic attributes (fauna and flora). The inland discharge of clandestine sewage from homes and businesses has been causing eutrophication in the ecosystem in an aggressive way.

The systemic corruption of the municipality began from its political-administrative emancipation on April 10, 1992, and destroyed much of Rio das Ostras and to date there is no basic sanitation model. The lack of potable water, sewage, public road paving, and public transportation are old and systemic problems for a municipality that received trillions in oil royalties.

Nowadays, much of the coastline of Rio das Ostras suffers from the advance of the sea, erosions, and uneven irregular constructions. In the urban area there is a significant increase in slums, violence, unemployment and social inequality. The lack of basic sanitation affects every municipality.

Even though Rio das Ostras is struggling in different instances, the city holds various public and private schools for primary and secondary education. Also, it is home to different higher education Universities, such as Universidade Federal Fluminense (UFF), Universidade Unigranrio, and Universidade Estácio de Sá.

== Curiosities ==
The city is a tourist destination with many beaches.

Every year there are several public festivals, most of which feature Brazilian music of different genres. Some examples are the Covers Festival, SESC Verão, Jazz & Blues and Motorcycle Festival.

Its economy is based mainly on tourism and the exploration and royalties of the oil that its basin offers, many national and international offshore companies are located in the region, generating several jobs.

The city is considered calm and peaceful to live in, compared to other cities in the state of Rio de Janeiro, but with a relatively higher cost of living as well.

== Economy ==
=== Tourism ===
According to the local Executive Branch, the main tourist attractions in the municipality are:

- União Biological Reserve (REBIO União) — managed by the Chico Mendes Institute for Biodiversity Conservation (ICMBio), approximately 53% of its territory is located in Rio das Ostras and extends to the municipalities of Casimiro de Abreu (46%) and Macaé (1%). REBIO União has a total area of 2,548 hectares of Atlantic Forest, where stretches of primary forest can still be found and examples of flora such as: vinhático, jequitibá, xaxim or samambaiaçú, palm hearts, etc. Research indicates that the Atlantic Forest of REBIO União has the greatest wealth and plant diversity of all remaining areas studied in the state of Rio de Janeiro. Originally, the lands of REBIO União belonged to "Fazenda União", which during the 19th century belonged to Joaquim Luiz Pereira de Souza, father of former president Washington Luís.
- Guilherme Nogueira Railway Culture Center – museum located in the century-old Rocha Leão Railway Station, which is part of the Leopoldina Railway line, connecting Rio de Janeiro to Vitória.

== See also ==
- Iriry Lagoon
