= Iriry Lagoon =

Body of water in Brazil

- Coca-Cola Lagoon
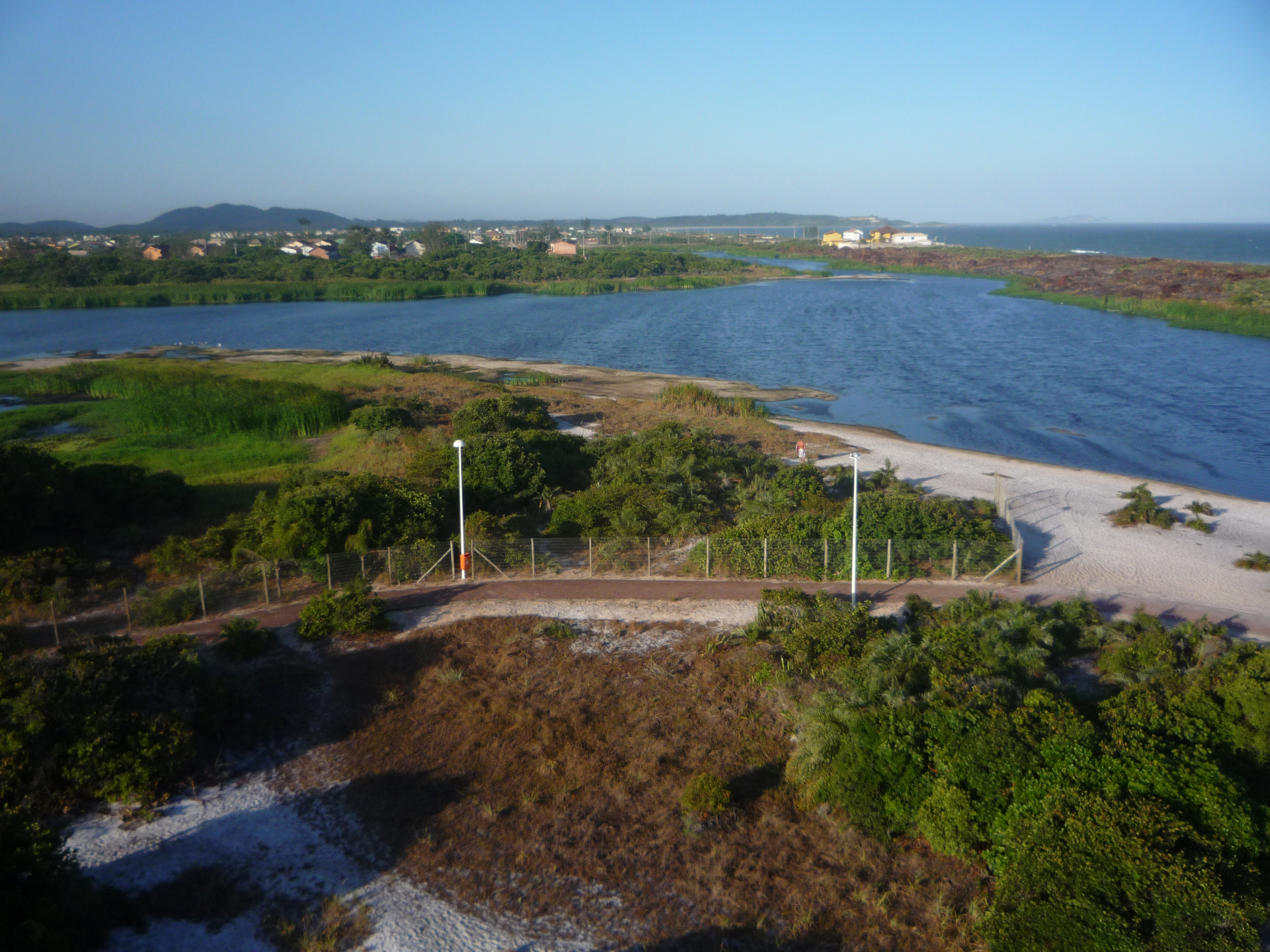
- Location: Rio das Ostras, Rio de Janeiro; Brazil
- Coordinates: 22°30′29″S 41°54′44″W
- Max. length: 0.63 metres (2.1 ft)
- Max. width: 0.71 metres (2.3 ft)
- Average depth: 1.5 metres (4.9 ft)
- Shore length^{1}: 2.65 kilometres (1.65 miles)
- ^{1} Shore length is not a well-defined measure.

The Iriry lagoon, also known as Doce Lagoon, Iodada Lagoon, or Coca-Cola Lagoon, is a body of water located in Rio das Ostras, between the Jardim Bela Vista and Mar y Lago neighborhoods, as well as parts of Terra Firme. The lagoon and the environmental protection area that surrounds it have several trails, kiosks, beaches, leisure areas, and a belvedere, and is one of the most famous tourist attractions in the city. The waterfront located in Jardim Bela Vista concentrates most of the lagoon's recreational facilities.

== Origin of the name ==
Iriry comes from the Tupi language and means lagoon of shells or mollusks. The name is a combination of ig (water, lagoon or river) + reri or riri (shell or mollusk).

== Characteristics ==
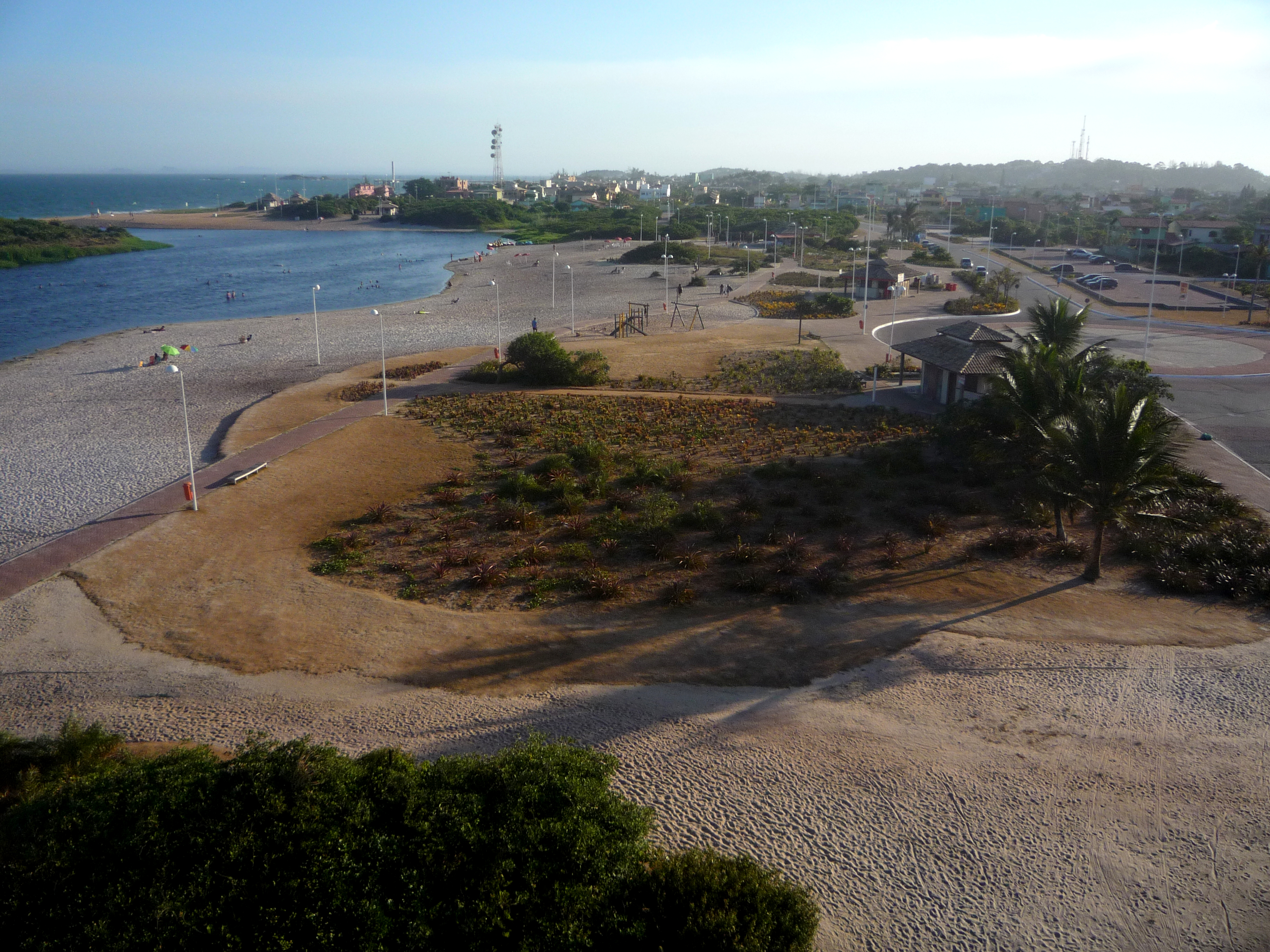
Iriry Lagoon shoreline.

The water is fresh and acidic (pH 5.3), has a high temperature (26°C), is rich in organic compounds and oxygen, and has a good bathing history.

The reddish-brown appearance of the waters is a consequence of the high concentration of salts such as iodine, in addition to the oxides, fulvic and humic acids, dissolved in the lagoon that are the results of the incomplete decomposition of organic material such as leaves and twigs. The accumulation of these substances does not allow light to penetrate the water, which causes its dark appearance. These substances, although rarely used by the lagoon's biota, are not toxic or considered a source of pollution.

The lagoon bottom consists of sand and soil, plus patches of silt and layers of decomposing material. Water renewal is slow and runoff is accomplished mainly through absorption and evaporation, while water replenishment is mostly from the groundwater that feeds the lagoon, followed by rainwater. Adjacent strips around the lagoon that are not deep enough to accumulate water at all times are always partially wet due to the proximity to the ground water table and flood during heavy rains. In the past, the lagoon used to join the sea, a fact that no longer occurs. It is common for the sand bar that separates the lagoon from the beach to break during rainy seasons, partially emptying the lagoon and renewing the water. The phenomenon is natural and beneficial. The sand barrier is rebuilt by wave action and the lagoon returns to its normal water level within a few weeks.

Located in the drainage basin of Rio das Ostras, with a perimeter of 2.65 km, a length and width of 0.63 and 0.71 km and an average depth of 1.5m, the lagoon is positioned in the middle of the depression into which the rainwater and groundwater flow, forming the reflecting pool of the Iriry lagoon. The surrounding area is apparently flat, with few undulations on the surface, standing out only the hillock on the coastal part. The relief of the lagoon area was shaped by the movements and oscillations of the sea level over the last 10,000 years, together with ocean currents, and more recently, by the action of winds.
