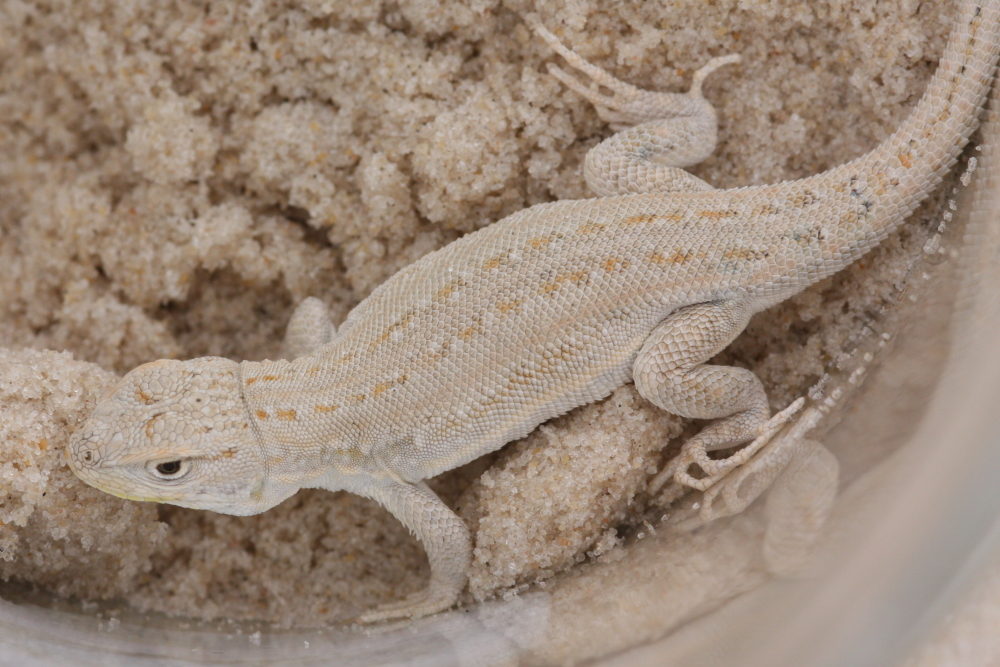

Conservation status
- Vulnerable (IUCN 2.3)

Scientific classification
- Kingdom: Animalia
- Phylum: Chordata
- Class: Reptilia
- Order: Squamata
- Suborder: Iguania
- Family: Liolaemidae
- Genus: Liolaemus
- Species: L. occipitalis

Binomial name
- Liolaemus occipitalis Boulenger, 1885

= Liolaemus occipitalis =

Species of lizard

Liolaemus occipitalis (skull tree iguana) is a species of lizard in the family Liolaemidae. It is found on the Atlantic coast of southern Brazil and eastern Uruguay.

Its natural habitat is sandy shores. It is threatened by habitat loss.
