= Costa Verde (Brazil) =

Coastline in Brazil

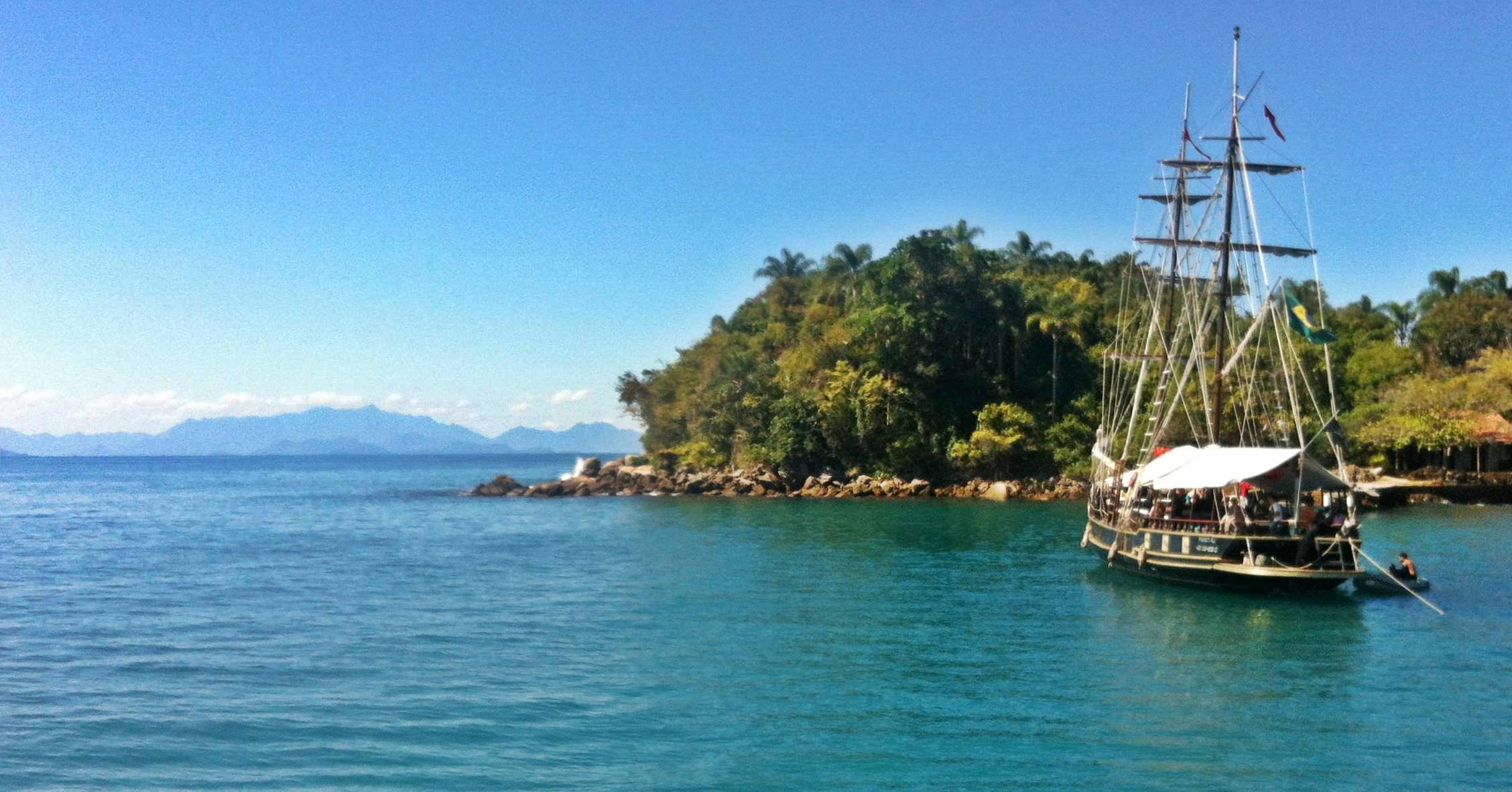
Costa Verde near Paraty

Costa Verde (Portuguese pronunciation: [ˈkɔstɐ ˈveʁdʒi], English: Green Coast) is a coastline in Brazil (chiefly in Rio de Janeiro state), which runs from Itaguaí, Rio de Janeiro state, to Santos, São Paulo state.

In São Paulo, it is known as litoral norte (northern coast). Brazil's Costa Verde is characterized by the Serra do Mar escarpment reaching Atlantic Ocean, creating a mountainous landscape very near the coast. It can be considered the greatest extension of Atlantic Forest biome reaching the ocean, between Baixada Fluminense (Fluminense Lowlands) and Baixada Santista (Santos Lowlands).

Points of interest in the Green Coast include Ilha Grande, Angra dos Reis, Ilhabela and Restinga da Marambaia. Several parks are located there, including Parque Estadual da Serra do Mar, "Parque Estadual de Ilhabela", in São Paulo, Parque Nacional da Serra da Bocaina and "Parque Estadual da Ilha Grande", in Rio de Janeiro.

Its name derives from its characteristic abundance of green from Atlantic Forest, known in Portuguese as Mata Atlântica. All definitions of the Costa Verde cover the entirety following municipalities, in Rio de Janeiro and São Paulo states:

- Itaguaí, RJ
- Mangaratiba, RJ
- Angra dos Reis, RJ
- Paraty, RJ
- Ubatuba, SP
- Caraguatatuba, SP
- São Sebastião, SP
- Ilhabela, SP

If it is considered only the geographic criterion for Costa Verde definition (the coast strip between "Baixada Fluminense" and "Baixada Santista"), then the municipalities of Bertioga, SP, Guarujá, SP and Itaguaí, RJ can be considered part of the Costa Verde. Nevertheless, an exact and official definition of it does not exist, and any criterion to define it is controversial.
