= Araruama Lagoon =

Hypersaline lake in Brazil

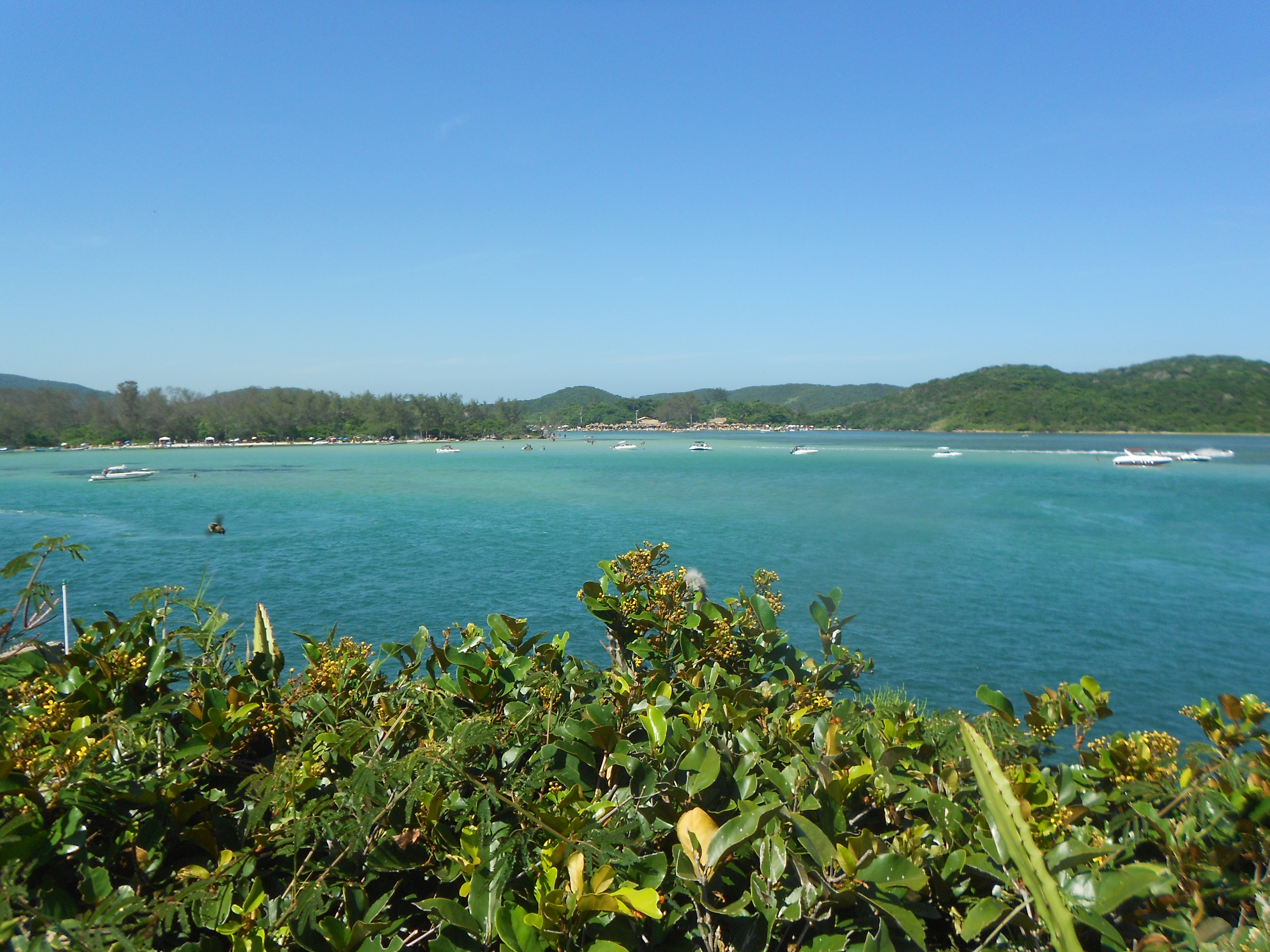
- Araruama Lagoon

- Location within Brazil
- Interactive map of Araruama Lagoon
- Location: Rio de Janeiro State, Brazil
- Coordinates: 22.88°S 42.22°W
- Type: hypersaline lake
- Max. length: 40 kilometres (25 mi)
- Max. width: 13 kilometres (8.1 mi)
- Surface area: 220 square kilometres (85 sq mi)
- Average depth: 3 metres (9.8 ft)
- Max. depth: 17 metres (56 ft)
- Water volume: 0.62 cubic kilometres (0.15 cu mi)

Araruama Lagoon is a lagoon located in the Região dos Lagos, Rio de Janeiro State, Brazil. It is one of the largest permanent hypersaline lagoons in the world, being 220 km^{2} in area, 40 km long and 13 km wide.

== See also ==
- Iriry Lagoon
