= Cuban immigration to Brazil =

Movement of Cuban nationals to Brazil

(Cuba) Cubans in Brazil Cubanos en Brasil Cubanos no Brasil
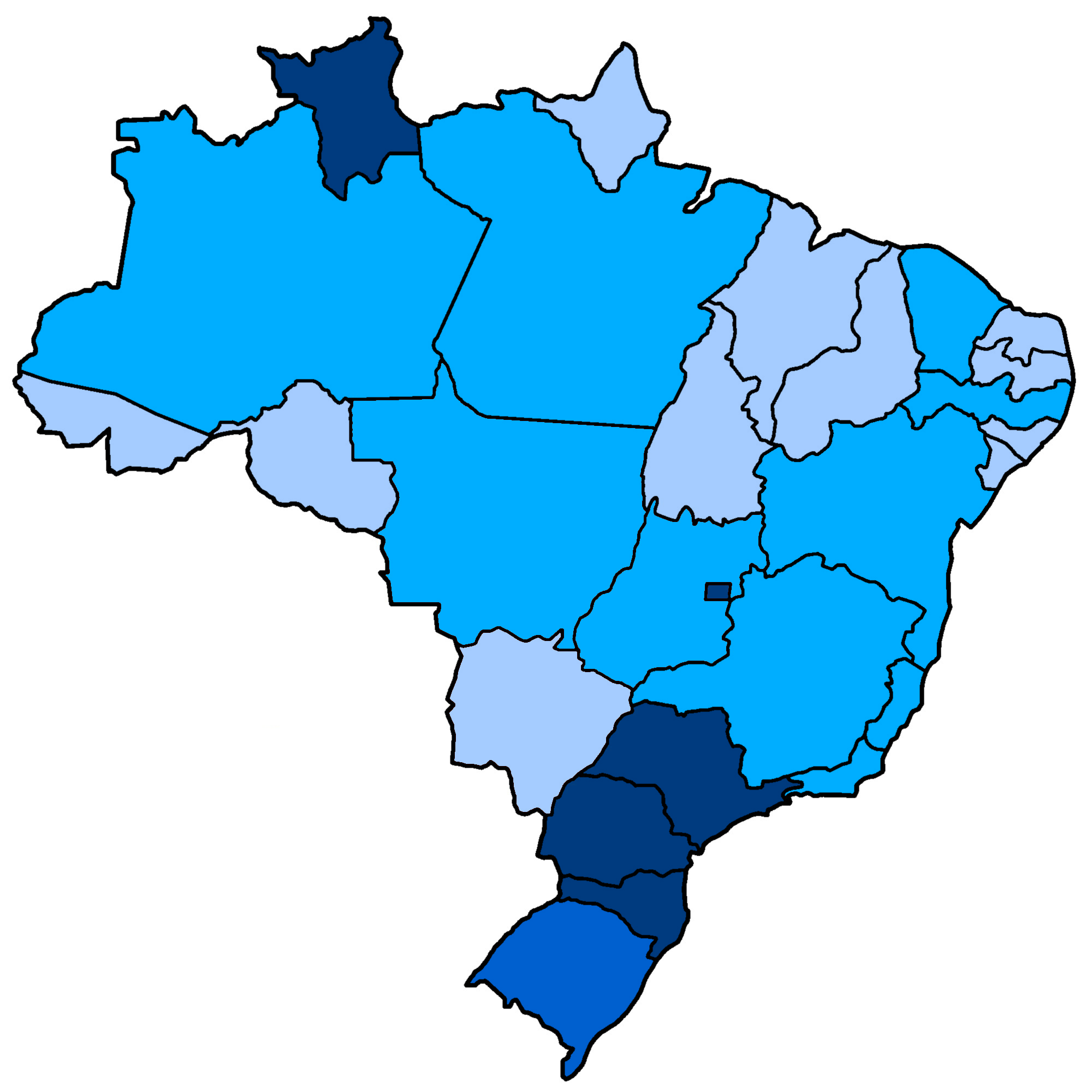
- Brazilian states by Cubans registered. 10,000+ 5,000-10,000 1,000-5,000 0-1,000

Total population
- 103,427 (registered), 100,000-150,000+ (estimated; when counting undocumented and refugee requestees in the country) (2025)

Regions with significant populations
- São Paulo, Santa Catarina, Paraná, Rio Grande do Sul, Distrito Federal, Roraima, Minas Gerais

Languages
- Spanish and Portuguese

Religion
- Predominantly Roman Catholicism

Related ethnic groups
- Cuban immigration to the United States, Cubans in France, Cubans in Spain

Cuban immigration to Brazil is the migratory movement of Cuban citizens to the South American nation of Brazil from the Caribbean nation of Cuba. Since the mid-2010s, there has been a significant increase in the flow of Cubans to Brazil resulting from the Cuban exodus caused by the aftermath of the installment of the ongoing communist regime in Cuba and the subsequent economic embargo imposed by the USA, which was intensified in 2026. In 2022, around 58,000 Cubans resided in Brazil. And by June 2025, Cuban citizens became the top asylum seeking nationality for Brazil, surpassing Venezuelans.

With 103,427 registered people by 2025 and about 100,000-150,000+ people overall, the Cuban community in Brazil has grown to be the third largest Cuban community in the world, being only behind the communities in Spain and the United States. And in front of other major communities such as those in Italy and Uruguay.

Cuban communities can be found in all 27 federative units and state capitals, with the most significant Cuban communities being found in the Southern region of Brazil and in Roraima. With the city of Boa Vista in the state of Roraima being the most prominent destination for Cuban migrants to Brazil, with 17,574 Cuban citizens being registered in the city by 2025. Most Cubans migrate to Brazil via the Northern region by crossing the Guyanese and French Guyanese borders towards Brazilian territory.

== History ==
=== Programa Mais Médicos (2013–2018) ===
The first major occurrence of Cuban immigration to Brazil was after the creation of the Programa Mais Médicos in 2013 by the then president Dilma Rousseff's government, which brought over 20,000 Cuban doctors to settlements across Brazil who needed medical services. This same national program was ended by Jair Bolsonaro's government in 2018, which resulted in the withdrawal of over 8,000 Cuban doctors whom offered services in Brazil.

=== Beginning of the Cuban exodus to Brazil (2016–2020) ===
Beginning in 2016, Cuban migration to Brazil began to intensify. Beforehand, Brazil was used by Cuban migrants as a path towards other nations such as the United States, Uruguay, and Chile but such trend changed as many Cuban migrants began to settle instead within Brazilian territory. Approximately 3,743 Cubans entering Brazil between 2016 and mid-2018. With statistics comparing the amount of asylum seeking requests from Cuban citizens in 2015 to 2017 showing that the number of Cubans asking for such status in Brazil went up 352%. These immigrants entered into Brazil through border cities between Guyana and Brazil, especially through the cities of Bonfim in the state of Roraima in Brazilian territory and the city of Lethem in Guyanese territory. Doing so because of the lack of visa requirements for Cuban citizens by the Guyanese government, making Cubans travel to Guyana, cross the country with Guyanese coyotes towards border cities and entering Brazil from there. After crossing, most Cubans then settle in Boa Vista or go out towards other areas of the country especially the Southern region.

=== Further intensification (2020-present) ===
Starting in 2020, Cuban migration towards the South American country began to intensify. Driven by the COVID-19 pandemic and the growing socioeconomic problems in Cuba caused by the country's communist government, thousands of Cubans began to request asylum in Brazil. Between 2020 and 2021, the number of Cubans registered in Brazil was over 3,500. Cuban immigrants now entered through various Brazilian border cities such as Pacaraima in Roraima and Oiapoque in Amapa. Even more Cubans began to arrive in Brazil between 2022 and 2024 with over 31,000 people arriving within that period. Most of these incoming immigrants from this wave of immigration began to have their destination set for the city of Curitiba, in the South of Brazil. Along with the growing migration, illegal immigration of Cubans to Brazil began to grow. With coyotes smuggling people into the country through various methods especially through the waters of the Oiapoque River that separate Brazil and French Guiana, and is used for such illegal immigration. Making Brazil's "Policia Federal" open up an investigation and conduct operations within the state of Amapa to stop the flow of immigrants through the waters of the river and through land. With the investigation discovering a criminal chain of migrant smugglers, that used trucks and boats to conduct their smugglings.

== Demographics ==
Cubans registered per decade in Brazil
Decade	Cubans registered	Growth	Ref.
2001–2010	2,896	-	
2011–2020	28,374	▲ +879%	
2021–2025	103,427	▲ +264.51%	

=== Cubans registered by Brazilian federative units ===
Federative units	Cubans registered (in 2000)	Cuban registered (in 2010)	Cuban registered (in 2020)	Cuban registered (as of 2025)	Percentage (by federative unit population)
Acre	3	14	165	266	0.0 %
Alagoas	3	17	149	290	0.0 %
Amapá	1	15	117	650	0.0 %
Amazonas	2	125	478	1,739	0.0 %
Bahia	4	83	909	1,582	0.0 %
Ceará	8	83	697	1,216	0.0 %
Distrito Federal	12	151	11,596	12,876	0.4 %
Espírito Santo	2	47	1,631	2,027	0.0 %
Goiás	4	54	394	2,382	0.0 %
Maranhão	7	40	406	715	0.0 %
Mato Grosso	7	41	239	1,379	0.0 %
Mato Grosso do Sul	0	6	195	613	0.0 %
Minas Gerais	19	181	1,674	3,103	0.0 %
Pará	6	25	411	1,076	0.0 %
Paraíba	3	10	171	324	0.0 %
Paraná	4	95	1,322	19,260	0.16%
Pernambuco	6	93	1,050	1,536	0.0 %
Piauí	0	8	223	285	0.0 %
Rio de Janeiro	38	416	1,298	2,132	0.0 %
Rio Grande do Norte	3	33	241	408	0.0 %
Rio Grande do Sul	4	93	1,166	5,892	0.0 %
Rondônia	3	36	291	648	0.0 %
Roraima	8	77	320	18,042	2.4 %
Santa Catarina	8	121	599	10,030	0.12 %
São Paulo	72	1,080	5,318	14,233	0.0 %
Sergipe	1	5	117	247	0.0 %
Tocantins	18	171	312	465	0.0 %

=== 25 Brazilian municipalities with the most registered Cubans ===
Municipality	Cuban registered (as of 2025)	Percentage (Cubans registered against the municipality's population)
Boa Vista, Roraima	17,574	4-5%
Brasília, Distrito Federal (Federal District (Brazil))	12,876	0.4 %
Curitiba, Paraná (Paraná (state))	11,309	0.6 %
São Paulo, São Paulo (São Paulo (state))	5,023	0.0 %
Florianópolis, Santa Catarina (Santa Catarina (state))	1,969	0.3 %
Foz do Iguaçu, Paraná (Paraná (state))	1,549	0.5 %
Manaus, Amazonas (Amazonas (Brazilian state))	1,405	0.0 %
Vila Velha, Espírito Santo	1,398	0.2 %
Goiânia, Goiás	1,304	0.0 %
São José, Santa Catarina (Santa Catarina (state))	1,130	0.3 %
Rio de Janeiro, Rio de Janeiro (Rio de Janeiro (state))	1,118	0.0 %
Palhoça, Santa Catarina (Santa Catarina (state))	1,046	0.4 %
Belo Horizonte, Minas Gerais	909	0.0 %
Pinhais, Paraná (Paraná (state))	899	0.6 %
Joinville, Santa Catarina (Santa Catarina (state))	811	0.0 %
Campinas, São Paulo (São Paulo (state))	795	0.0%
Porto Alegre, Rio Grande do Sul	780	0.0 %
Itajaí, Santa Catarina (Santa Catarina (state))	752	0.2 %
Cascavel, Paraná (Paraná (state))	750	0.2 %
Cuiabá, Mato Grosso	691	0.0 %
São José dos Pinhais, Paraná (Paraná (state))	681	0.0 %
Içara, Santa Catarina (Santa Catarina (state))	559	0.0 %
Caxias do Sul, Rio Grande do Sul	486	0.0 %
Ponta Grossa, Paraná (Paraná (state))	486	0.0 %

=== Cubans registered by Brazilian state capital ===
Federative units	Cuban registered (as of 2025)	Percentage (Cubans registered in the city against the overall amount of Cubans in the federative unit)
Rio Branco, Acre (Acre (state))	103	38.7 %
Maceió, Alagoas	65	22.4 %
Macapá, Amapá	307	47.2 %
Manaus, Amazonas (Amazonas (Brazilian state))	1,405	80.6 %
Salvador, Bahia	252	15.9 %
Fortaleza, Ceará	395	32.5 %
Brasília, Distrito Federal (Federal District (Brazil))	12,876	100%
Vitória, Espírito Santo	62	3.0 %
Goiânia, Goiás	1,304	54.7 %
São Luís, Maranhão	75	10.5 %
Cuiabá, Mato Grosso	691	50.1 %
Campo Grande, Mato Grosso do Sul	225	36.7 %
Belo Horizonte, Minas Gerais	909	29.3 %
Belém, Pará	226	21.0 %
João Pessoa, Paraíba	82	25.3 %
Curitiba, Paraná (Paraná (state))	11,309	58.7%
Recife, Pernambuco	324	21.0 %
Teresina, Piauí	27	9.5 %
Rio de Janeiro, Rio de Janeiro (Rio de Janeiro (state))	1,118	52.4 %
Natal, Rio Grande do Norte	86	21.0 %
Porto Alegre, Rio Grande do Sul	780	13.2 %
Porto Velho, Rondônia	218	33.6 %
Boa Vista, Roraima	17,574	97.4 %
Florianópolis, Santa Catarina (Santa Catarina (state))	1,969	19.6 %
São Paulo, São Paulo (São Paulo (state))	5,023	35.3 %
Aracaju, Sergipe	66	26.7 %
Palmas, Tocantins	85	18.3 %

=== Cubans registered by Brazilian region ===
Region	Cuban registered (as of 2025)	Percentage (by total number of Cubans registered in Brazil)
Center-West (Centro-Oeste)	17,250	16.69%
Northeast (Nordeste)	6,603	6.38%
Norte (North)	22,886	22.13%
Southeast (Sudeste)	21,495	20.8%
South (Sul)	35,182	34.0%

=== Cubans in Paraná ===
The state of Paraná houses the largest Cuban community of any Brazilian federative units, reaching such a mark in 2025 when over 9,600 Cubans arrived to the state. Such wave of migration to the state began to increase around 2020 to 2021 when more than 1,600 Cubans arrived, with most of them finding themselves in and around Greater Curitiba. By 2025, nearly 20,000 Cubans lived in the state, representing 0.16% of the state's population, around 11,000 of them lived in Curitiba, representing nearly 59% of the Cubans in the state and practically 11% of all the Cubans in the country. Most of the Cuban citizens present in the state remained in and around Curitiba but many had spread themselves onto other parts of the state, especially in cities like Foz do Iguaçu, near the Paraguayan and Argentine borders of Brazil and Cascavel.

Top 25 municipalities	Cuban registered (as of 2025)	Percentage (by municipality population)	Percentage (by Cubans registered in the state)
Curitiba	11,309	0.6%	58.7%
Foz do Iguaçu	1,549	0.5 %	8.0%
Pinhais	899	0.7 %	4.67%
Cascavel	750	0.2 %	3.89%
São José dos Pinhais	681	0.1 %	3.53%
Ponta Grossa	486	0.1 %	2.52%
Maringá	206	0.0 %	1.06%
Colombo	194	0.0 %	1.00%
Campo Largo	181	0.1 %	0.93%
Apucarana	180	0.1 %	0.93%
Londrina	166	0.0 %	0.86%
Campo Mourão	142	0.1 %	0.73%
Fazenda Rio Grande	131	0.0 %	0.68%
Guarapuava	126	0.0%	0.65%
Rolândia	115	0.1 %	0.60%
Araucária	113	0.0%	0.59%
Almirante Tamandaré	93	0.0 %	0.48%
Medianeira	92	0.1 %	0.48%
Piraquara	80	0.0 %	0.42%
Arapongas	73	0.0 %	0.38%
Palotina	68	0.1 %	0.35%
Pato Branco	47	0.0 %	0.24%
Nova Aurora	46	0.3 %	0.24%
Palmas	33	0.0 %	0.17%
No information	852		4.42%

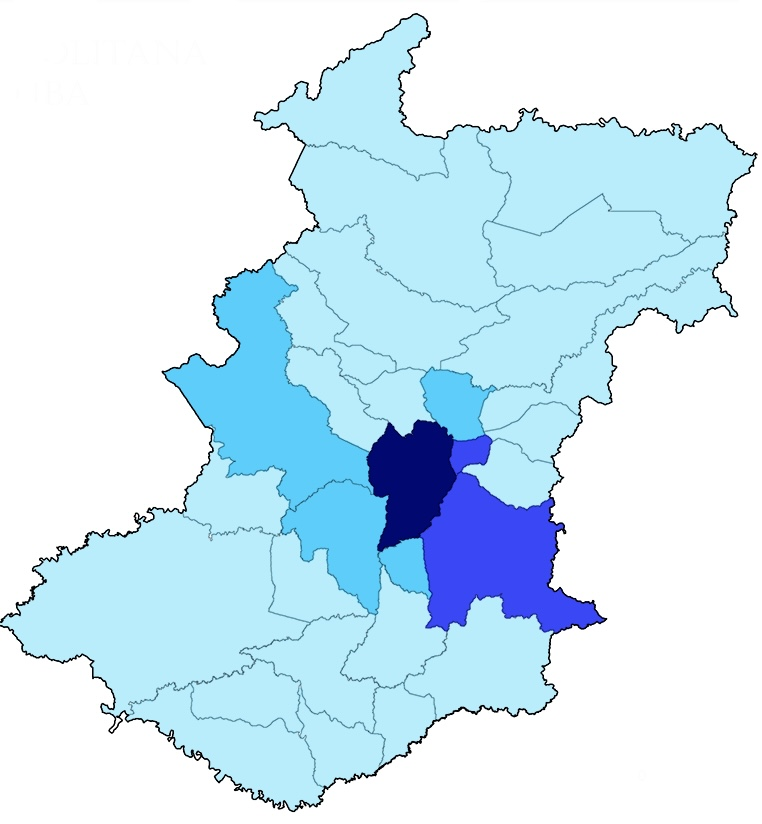
Map of Cuban citizens by municipality in Greater Curitiba 5,000-10,000+ 1,000-5,000 100-1,000 0-100

==== Cubans in Curitiba ====
Beginning after the end of the COVID-19 pandemic, Curitiba, the capital of the state of Paraná, began to became a major gateway city for Cuban immigrants in Brazil. The arrival of over 1,000 immigrants in 2024 consolidated the city's importance to the community. The rise of work opportunities, safety, and facilities in the city made the city extremely attractive to incoming immigrants. And combined with the migratory measures imposed by U.S. president Donald Trump after retaining office in January 2025, which hurt the typical Cuban migrational flow towards Southern Florida, the Brazilian municipality became greatly desired. The Cuban community in the city began to create businesses, social media groups, and found jobs in various sectors, boosting the local economy and facilitating the migrational flow towards the city. The rapid migrational flow made the city gain the nickname of "Miami of Brazil" or "South America's Miami" due to the similar Cuban desire to immigrate to it as they had immigrated to Miami. And due to the rapid influence of Cuban culture on the community, as the newly arrived immigrants began to popularize the sport of baseball in the city, Cuban gastronomy, and making Spanish an even more influential language in the community.

Greater Curitiba municipalities with Cuban citizens	Cuban citizens registered (as of 2025)
Adrianópolis	4
Almirante Tamandaré	93
Araucária	113
Balsa Nova	10
Bocaiúva do Sul	1
Campina Grande do Sul	23
Campo Largo	181
Campo Magro	11
Cerro Azul	1
Colombo	194
Contenda	2
Curitiba	11,309
Fazenda Rio Grande	131
Itaperuçu	2
Lapa	5
Pinhais	899
Piraquara	80
Quatro Barras	1
Quitandinha	4
Rio Branco do Sul	6
São José dos Pinhais	681
Tijucas do Sul	3
Tunas do Paraná	2
Total	13,756

=== Cubans in Roraima ===
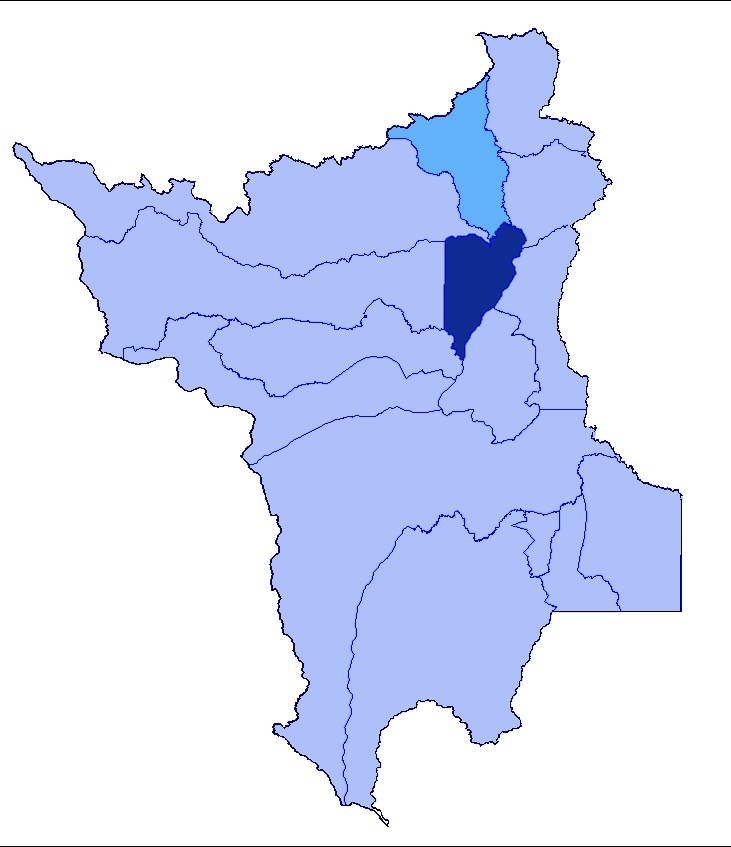
Map of Cuban citizens by registration in each municipality in the state of Roraima. 1,000-10,000+ 100-1,000 0-100

The state of Roraima houses the second-largest Cuban population by state in Brazil with around 18,000 Cubans living there as of 2025. The state's capital of Boa Vista houses nearly all of the Cubans in the state, about 17,542 being registered there as of 2025, becoming the municipality with the most Cuban citizens in the entire country. Cubans have also become nearly 5% of Boa Vista's population and about 2.4% of Roraima's population, the highest percentage of Cubans in a state and municipality in Brazil. Most of the Cubans that live in the state arrived there through the Brazil–Guyana border, crossing into Bonfim, in the eastern part of the state, and from there moving towards Boa Vista and other parts of the country.

Municipality	Cubans registered (as of 2025)	Percentage (by municipality population)	Percentage (by Cubans registered in the state)
Boa Vista	17,574	4-5%	97.4%
Pacaraima	221	1%	1.2%
Bonfim	75	0.5%	0.4%
Amajari	47	0.29 %	0.3%
Cantá	30	0.1 %	0.2%
Mucajaí	12	0.0 %	0.1%
Alto Alegre	5	0.0 %	0.0%
Caracaraí	2	0.0%	0.0%
São João da Baliza	2	0.0 %	0.0%
Uiramutã	1	0.0 %	0.0%
Unknown/no info	73		0.4%

== See also ==
- Cuban exodus
- Immigration to Brazil
- Cuban immigration to the United States
