= Areia Branca =

Areia Branca may refer to:

- Areia Branca (Paraná) – former name of the city of Quitandinha in Paraná, Brazil
- Areia Branca (Rio Grande do Norte) – city in Rio Grande do Norte, Brazil
- Areia Branca (Sergipe) – city in Sergipe, Brazil
