= Palácio Quitandinha =

Casino hotel in Petrópolis, Brazil

- Palácio Quitandinha.

General information
- Location: Petrópolis, State of Rio de Janeiro, Brazil
- Coordinates: 22°31′38.16″S 43°12′46.01″W
- Opening: 1944

Technical details
- Floor count: 6
- Floor area: 50,000 square meters

Design and construction
- Architect: Luis Fossatti

Other information
- Number of rooms: 440
- Number of suites: 13

Website
- Quitandinha Palace - Petrópolis Foundation of Culture and Tourism

The Palácio Quitandinha is a historic former luxury casino hotel in Petrópolis, State of Rio de Janeiro, Brazil. In 1947, the Palácio Quitandinha was the site of the Rio Treaty, attended by United States President Harry Truman.

== History ==
Designed by Italian architect Luis Fossatti, and constructed between 1941 and 1946 by Brazilian entrepreneur Joaquim Rolla, the Palácio Quitandinha is one of the most impressive architectural monuments in Petrópolis. The exterior is in the Norman-French style, while the interior is a mix of Brazilian Baroque and Art Deco. The surface area of the hotel is 50 thousand square meters. It has six floors, with a 10 meter high ground floor. It has 440 rooms plus 13 suites with decor by Dorothy Draper.

The hotel was, for many years, probably the second most famous hotel of the country, after the Copacabana Palace hotel in Rio de Janeiro, which is only about 65 km from Petrópolis. The scenic artificial lake in front of the hotel, loosely resembling the shape of Brazil, was built to provide a source of water in the event of a fire.

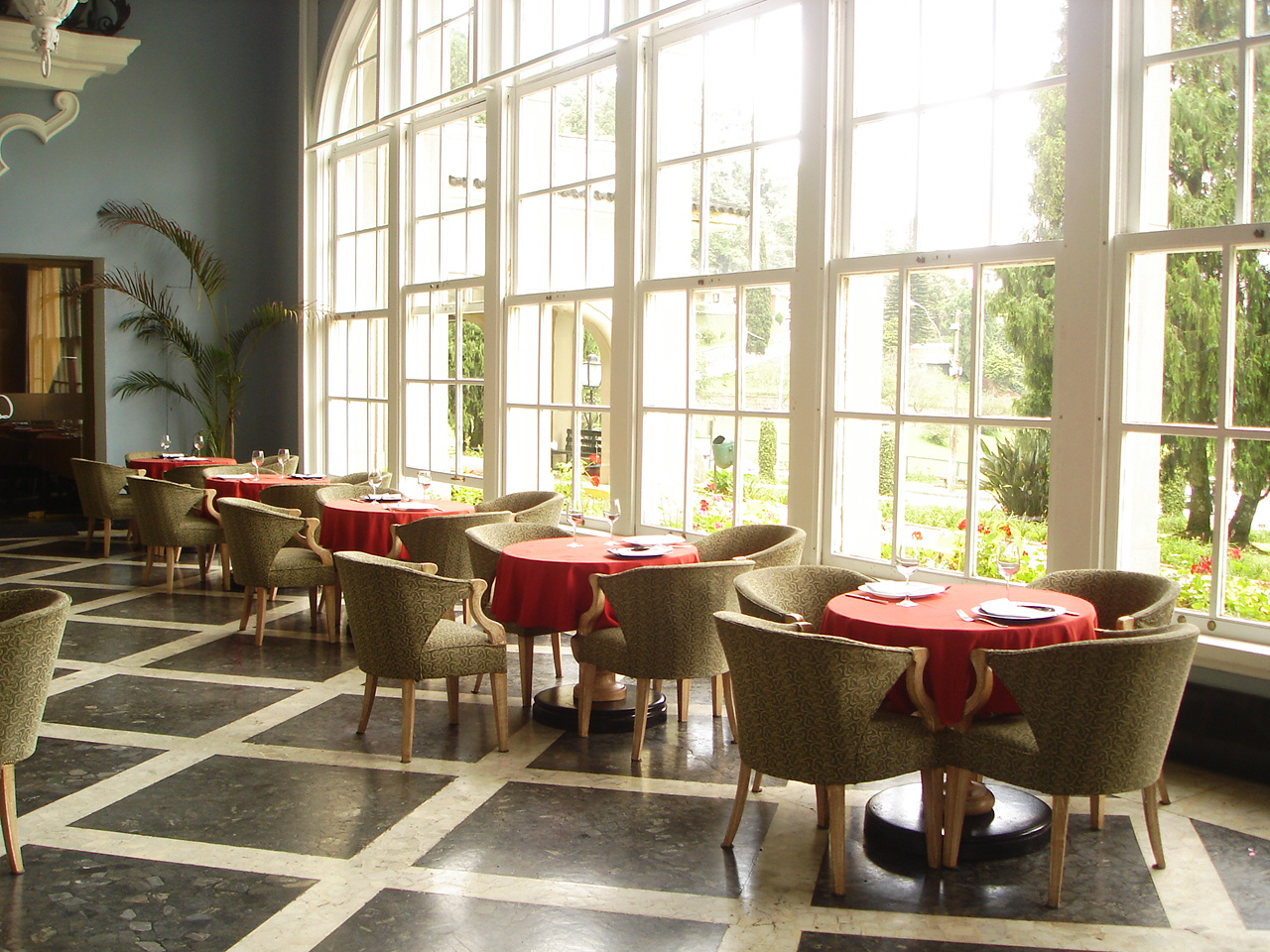
Interior of the restaurant

When it was opened as the "Cassino Hotel Quitandinha", the Palácio Quitandinha was the largest hotel casino in Latin America. Gambling had been permitted in Brazil since 1930, but it was outlawed on May 30, 1946 by decree of the federal government under president Eurico Gaspar Dutra. The ruling outlawed all types of gambling from casinos to games of chance in Brazil. As a result, the casino closed after only two years.

Notable guests who stayed at the hotel included Errol Flynn, Orson Welles, Lana Turner, Henry Fonda, Maurice Chevalier, Greta Garbo, Carmen Miranda, Walt Disney, Bing Crosby, politicians like Eva Perón and president Getúlio Vargas of Brazil and king Carol II of Romania.

The hotel eventually closed in 1962 and its rooms were sold as private residences in 1963. The imposing façade and the scenic surrounding of the hotel makes it an important tourist attraction itself. The building's enormous public areas were restored by SESC, a Brazilian commerce organization which had taken them over, beginning in 2007.

== Trivia ==
A restaurant owner from Areia Branca in Paraná, Reinaldo Paolini, once stayed at the Hotel Palácio Quitandinha. He was so impressed by this casino hotel that he named his restaurant in Areia Branca after it. Over time, the name "Quitandinha" became common for Areia Branca until the town was officially named after the Palácio Quitandinha in 1961.

== Gallery ==
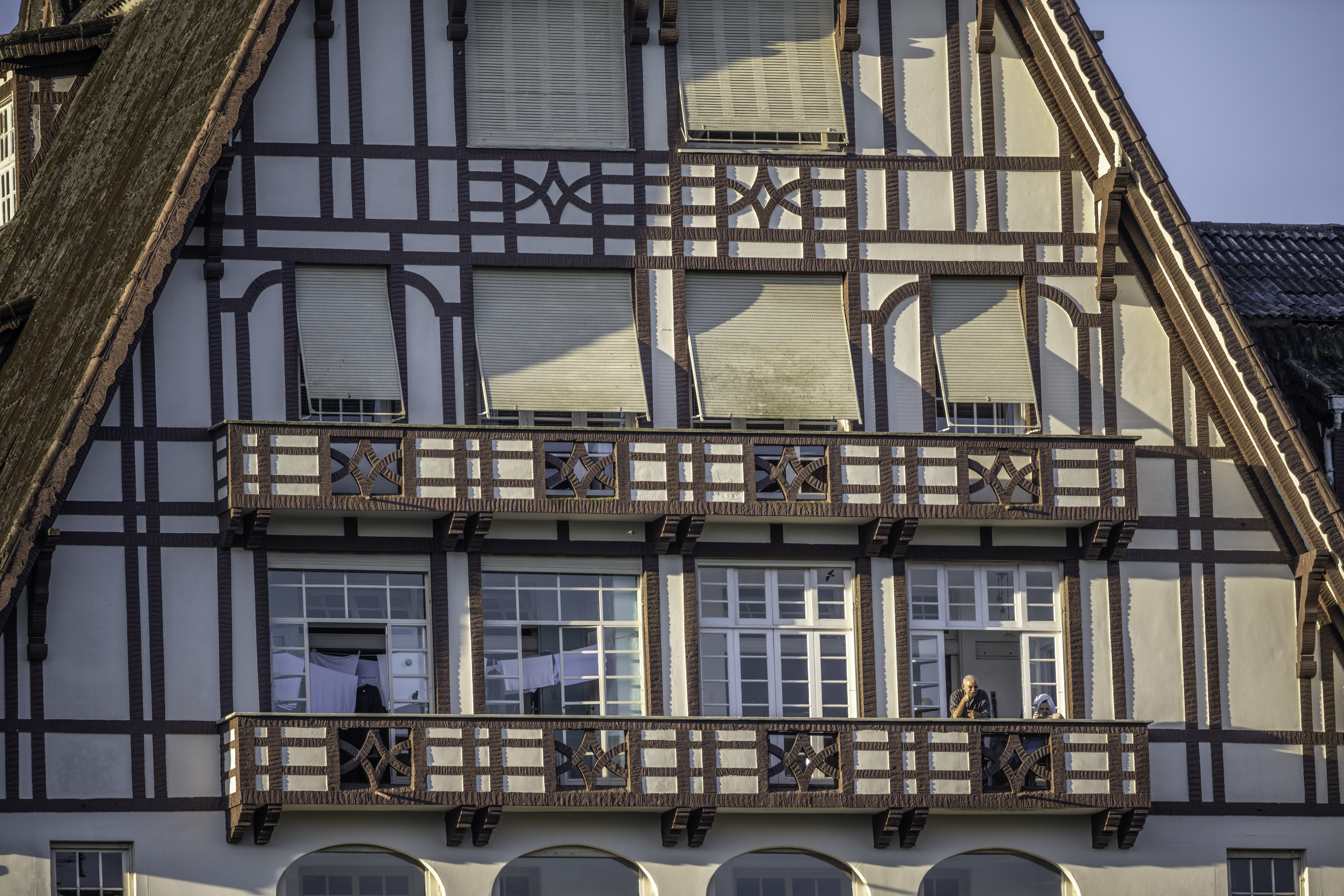
Detail of the facade and balconies, surrounded by local vegetation.

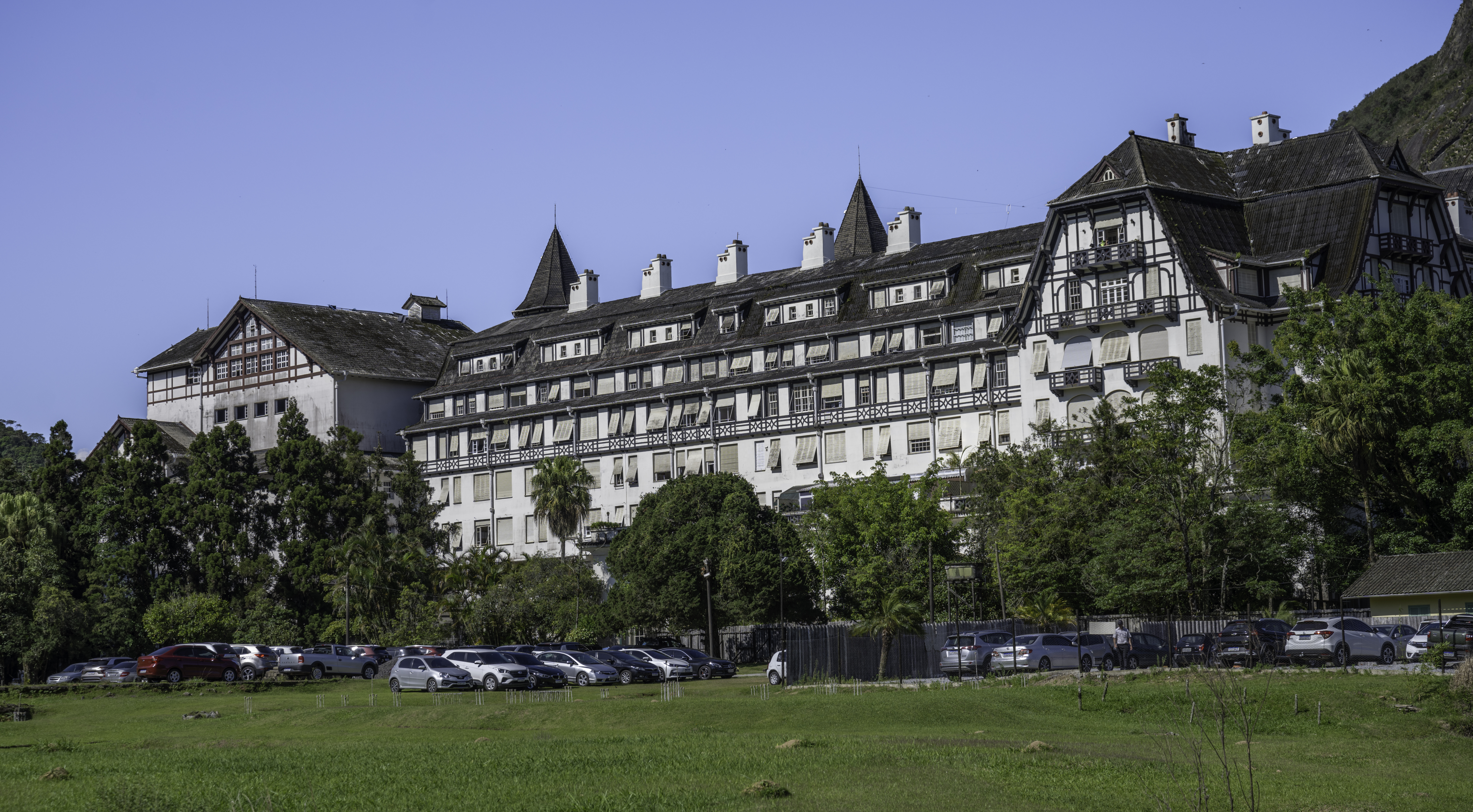
View from the back.

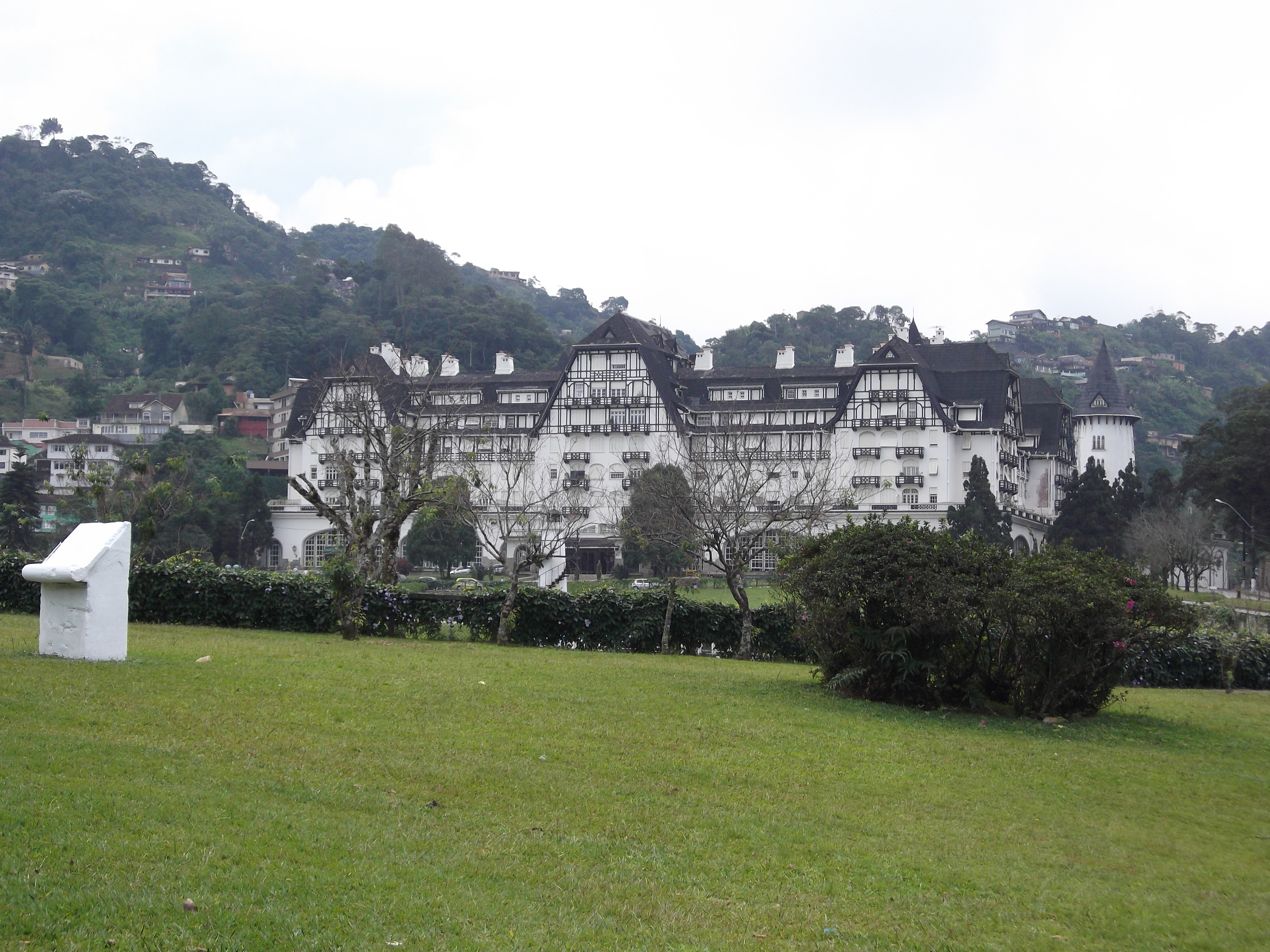
Wide view of Palácio Quitandinha, surrounded by gardens.

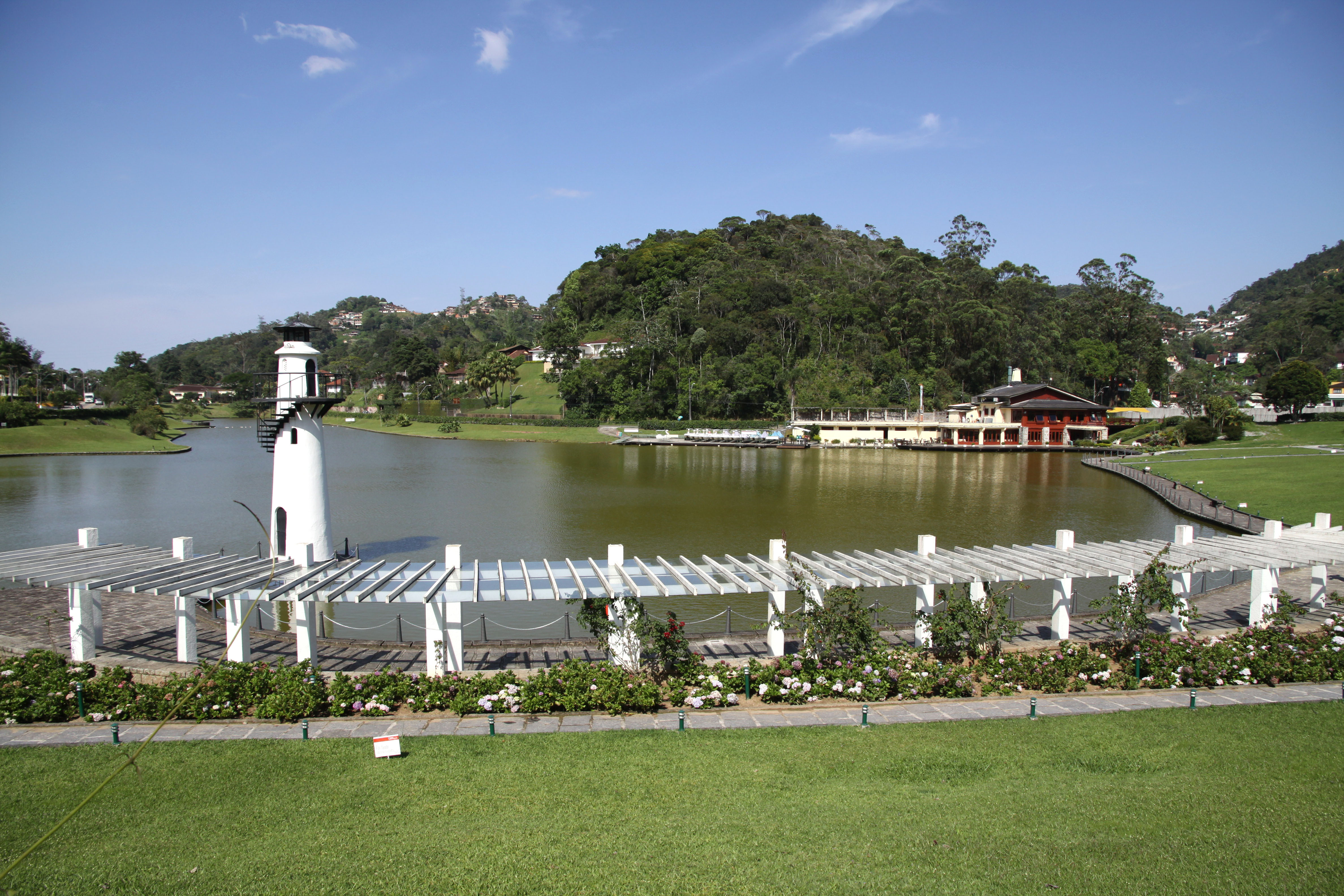
The lake in front of the building, with the structure reflected in the water.

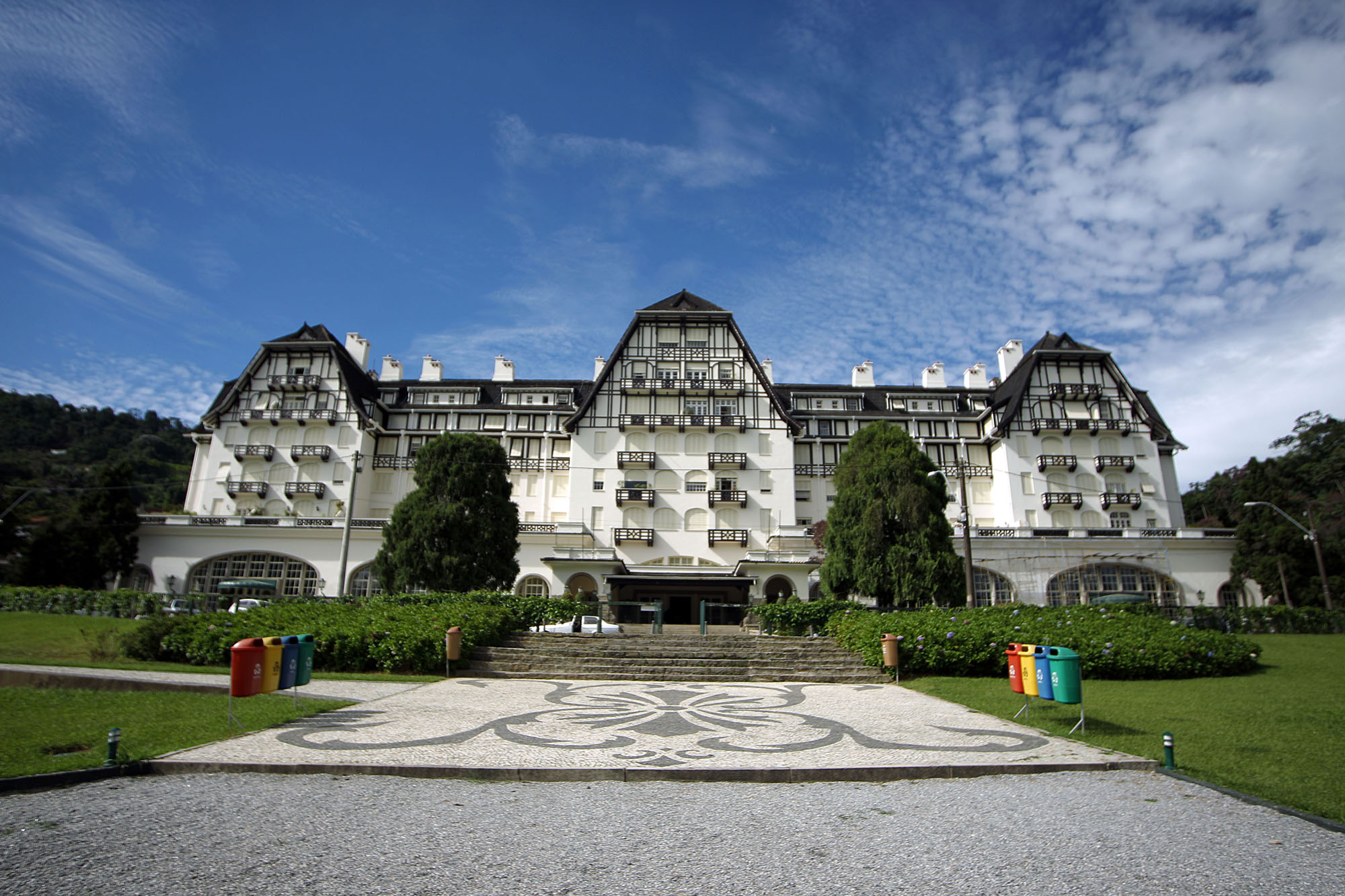
Main entrance of Sesc Quitandinha, highlighting its architectural style.

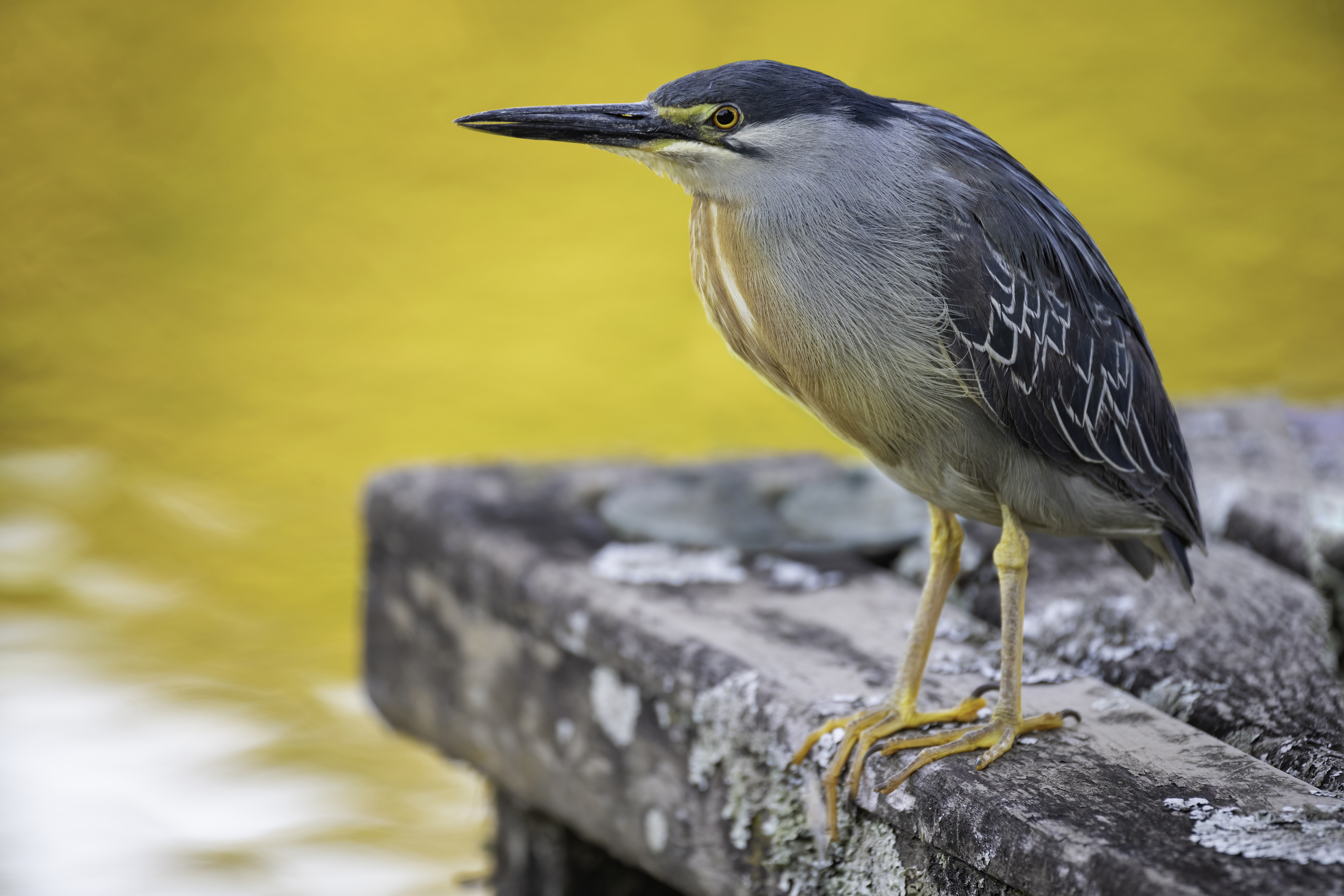
Striated heron near the lake.

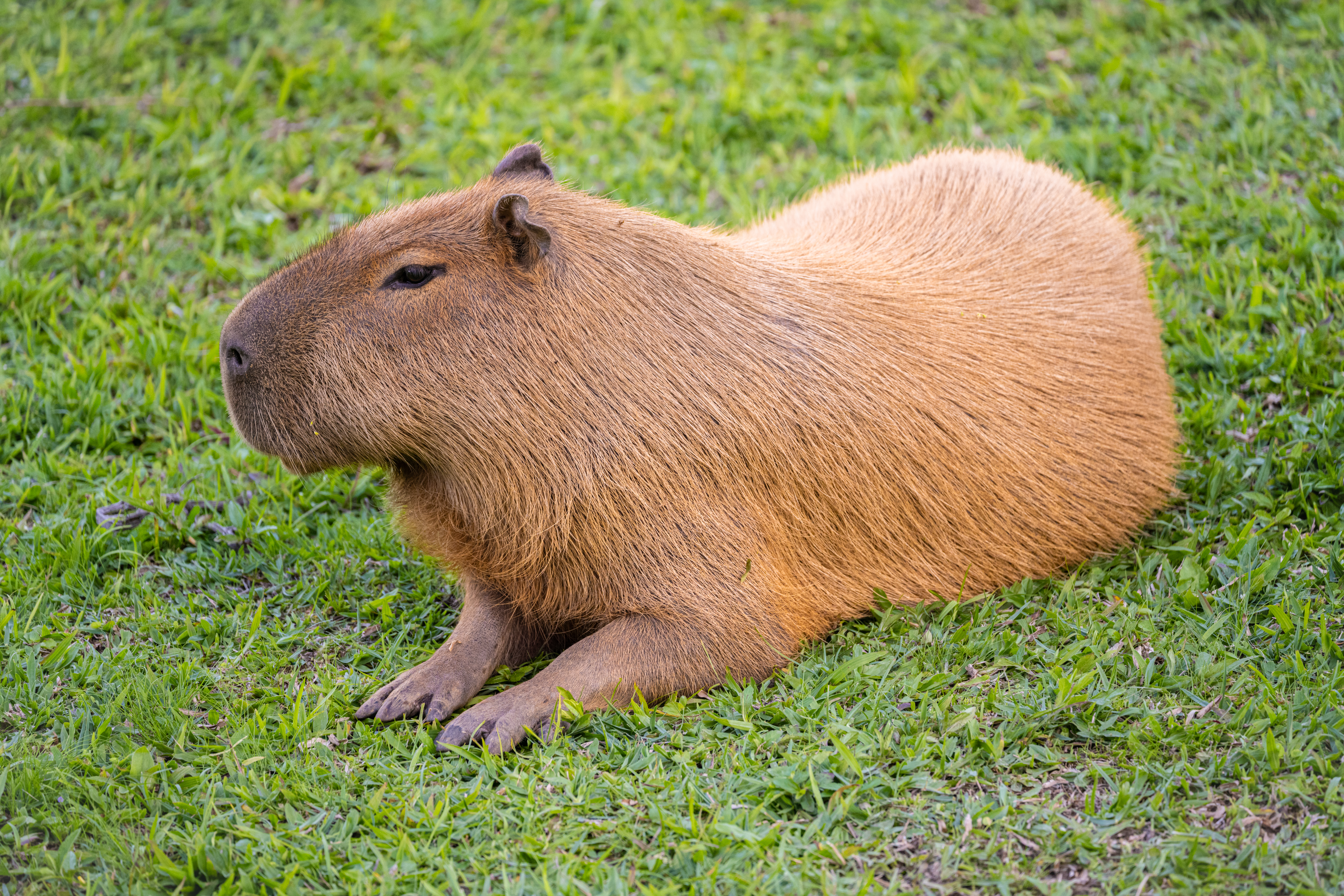
Capybara resting by the lake.
