= Serra da Baitaca State Park =

State park in Paraná, Brazil

- Parque Estadual Serra da Baitaca
- IUCN category II (national park)
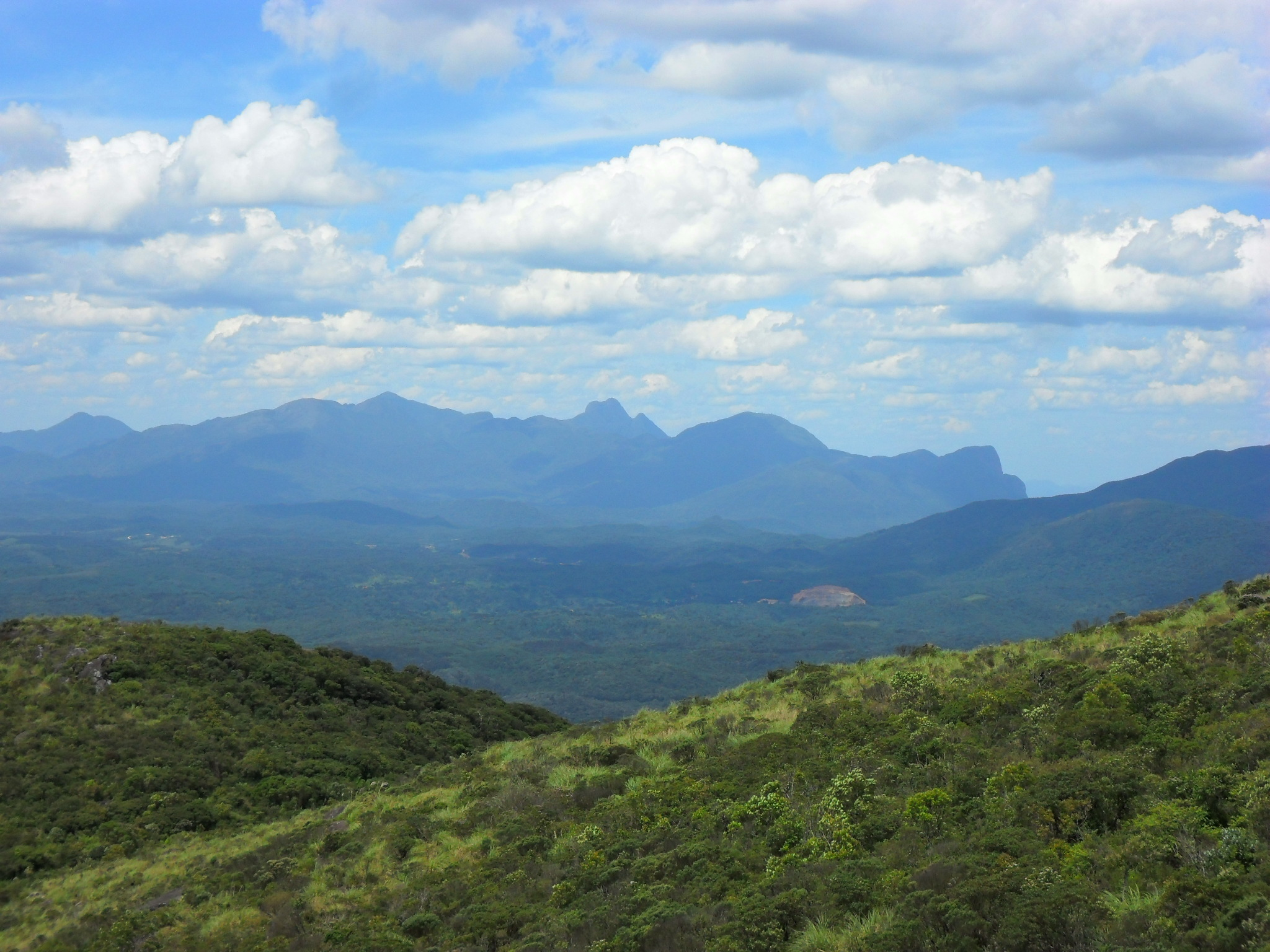
- View of the Serra Ibitiraquire from the Anhangava

- Location within Brazil
- Nearest city: Quatro Barras, Paraná
- Coordinates: 25°23′18″S 49°00′09″W
- Area: 3,053 hectares (7,540 acres)
- Designation: State park
- Created: 5 June 2002
- Administrator: Instituto Ambiental do Paraná

The Serra da Baitaca State Park (Portuguese: Parque Estadual Serra da Baitaca) is a state park in the state of Paraná, Brazil.

== Location ==
The Serra da Baitaca State Park is divided between the municipalities of Piraquara and Quatro Barras in the state of Paraná (state). The larger part is in Quatro Barras, with a narrow southern extension into Piraquara. It has an area of 3,053 hectares (7,540 acres). It is 25 kilometres (16 mi) from Curitiba, the first major elevation of the Serra do Mar on the west side. The summit of the Serra da Baitaca has an altitude of 1,420 metres (4,660 ft). The state park is considered the most important practical mountaineering school in Paraná, and one of the most important in Brazil. The park holds the sources of the Iguaçu River, and also holds springs that supply the city of Curitiba.

== History ==
The Serra da Baitaca State Park was created by state decree 5.765 of 5 June 2002, with an area of 3,053.21 hectares (7,544.6 acres). The purpose was to conserve a sample of montane and high montane dense rainforest biome, and to promote activities that do not affect the ecosystem and support conservation. It was one of four state parks created on that date by the governor, Jaime Lerner, who also expanded two conservation units. The state park is part of the Lagamar mosaic of conservation units. It is administered by the Instituto Ambiental do Paraná. The consultative council was created on 11 September 2009 to contribute to planning and implementation of the management plan. As of 2013 there was still no management plan through which the considerable tourism potential of the park could be realized.

== Sources ==
- Jaime Lerner (5 June 2002), DECRETO Nº 5765 - 05/06/2002 (PDF) (in Portuguese)
- Parque Estadual Serra da Baitaca (in Portuguese), MMA: Ministério do Meio Ambiente
- PES Serra da Baitaca (in Portuguese), ISA: Instituto Socioambiental
- Raquel Ribeiro de Souza Silva (September–December 2013), "Turismo em unidade de conservação: o caso do Parque Estadual Serra da Baitaca", Revista Turismo Visão e Ação, 15 (3), Universidade do Vale do Itajai, ISSN 1983-7151
- Unidades de Conservação - Mosaico do Litoral Sul de São Paulo e do Litoral do Paraná - LAGAMAR (in Portuguese), ICMBio, archived from the original on 2019-05-27
