= Illegal immigration to Brazil =

Immigration to Brazil in violation of Brazilian law

Illegal immigration to Brazil is the entry in Brazil of foreign nationals without government permission, and in violation of the Brazilian immigration laws.

As the country's economy improves it has found itself a magnet for illegal immigration. Many illegal immigrants have arrived particularly from Haiti and Bolivia.

Brazil often creates special legalization procedures for immigrant groups who become too numerous and would not otherwise qualify for immigration. As of 2024, Brazil allows practically unrestricted immigration for nationals of all South American countries, Afghanistan, Haiti, Syria and Ukraine, for nationals of Cuba who participated in the Mais Médicos medical training program, for nationals of the Dominican Republic and Senegal who claim refugee status (without reviewing the refugee claim), and for nationals of member states of the Community of Portuguese Language Countries in certain occupations or who are already in Brazil.

== See also ==
- Immigration to Brazil
- Visa policy of Brazil
