= Quatro Barras =

Coordinates: 25°22′S 49°05′W

Quatro Barras parana
- Municipality
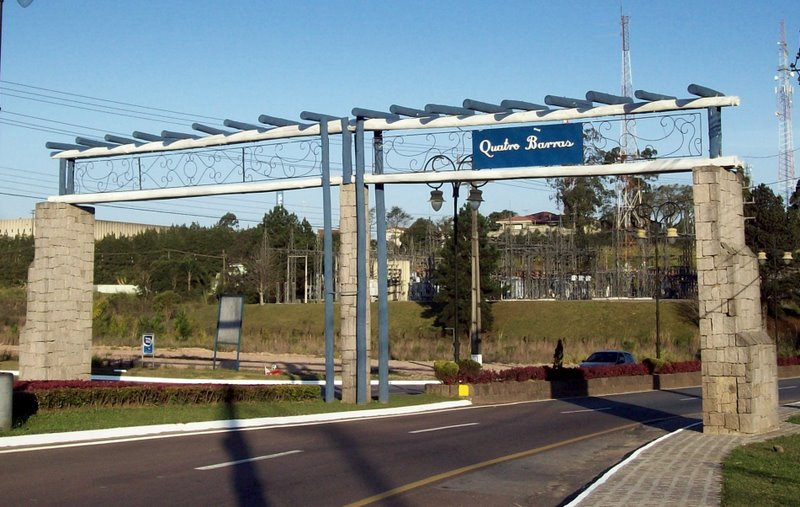

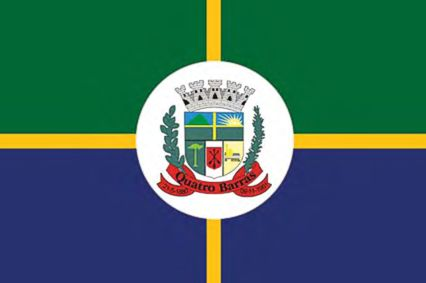
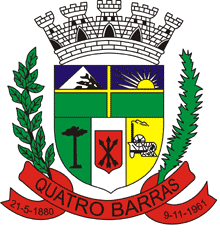
- Flag Coat of arms
- Interactive map of Quatro Barras parana
- Country: Brazil
- Region: Southern
- State: Paraná
- Mesoregion: Metropolitana de Curitiba

Population (2020)
  - Total: 23,911
- Time zone: UTC−3 (BRT)

Quatro Barras is a municipality in the state of Paraná in the Southern Region of Brazil.

The municipality contains part of the 3,053 hectares (7,540 acres) Serra da Baitaca State Park, created in 2002.

== See also ==
- List of municipalities in Paraná
