= Piraquara =

- Municipality
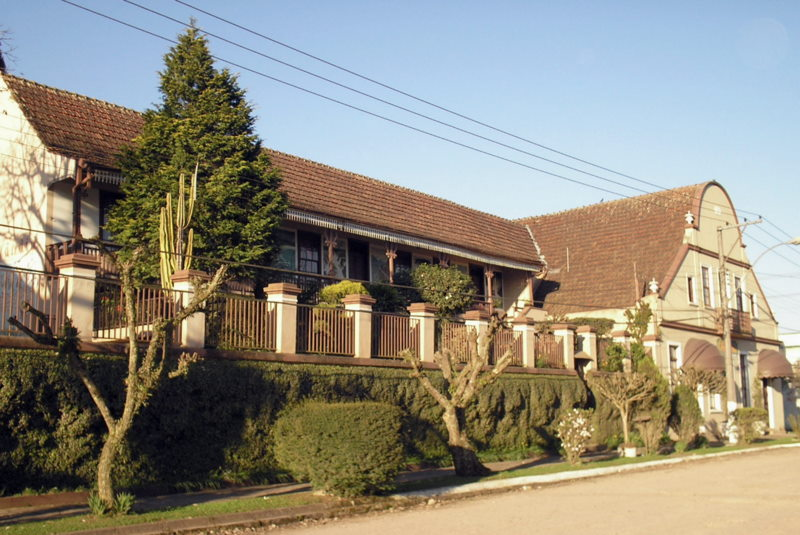

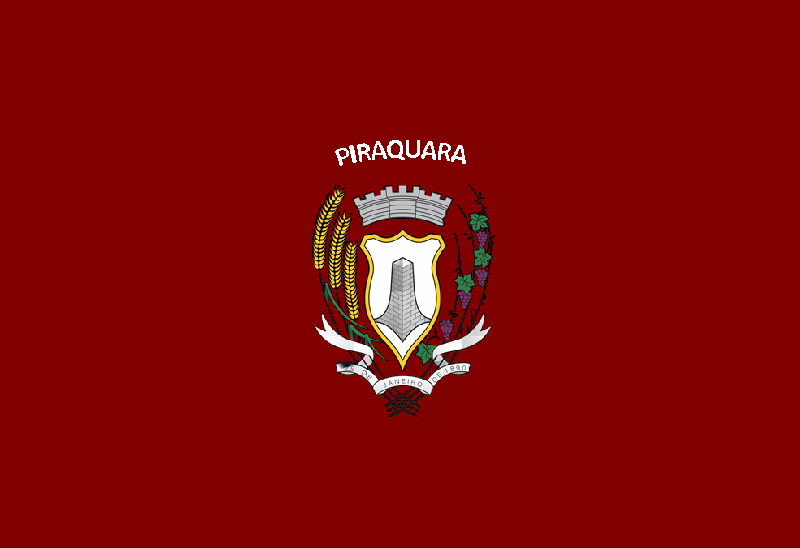
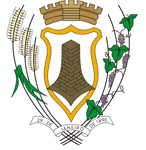
- Flag Coat of arms

- Location of Piraquara

- Location in Brazil
- Coordinates: 25°26′31″S 49°03′46″W
- Country: Brazil
- Region: Southern
- State: Paraná
- Mesoregion: Metropolitana de Curitiba

Area
  - Total: 87.661 sq mi (227.042 km^{2})

Population (2022 Census)
  - Total: 118,730
  - Estimate (2025): 127,433
  - Density: 1,354.4/sq mi (522.94/km^{2})
- Time zone: UTC−3 (BRT)

Piraquara is a municipality in the state of Paraná in the Southern Region of Brazil.

The municipality contains part of the 3,053 hectares (7,540 acres) Serra da Baitaca State Park, created in 2002.

== See also ==
- List of municipalities in Paraná
