= Itaperuçu =

Coordinates: 25°12′S 49°22′W

- Municipality
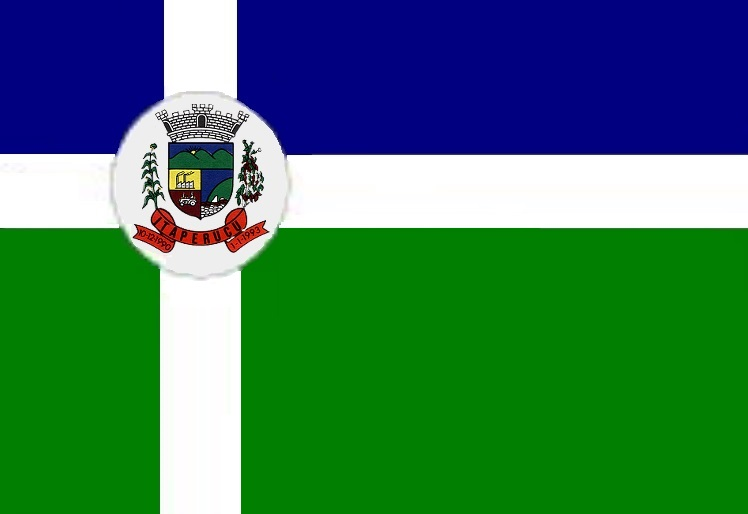
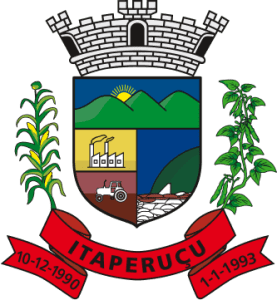
- Flag Seal
- Nicknames: Cidade dos Minérios ("Ores City"); Cidade da Madeira ("Woods City")
- Country: Brazil
- Region: Southern
- State: Paraná
- Mesoregion: Metropolitana de Curitiba
- Emancipated: 10 December 1990
- Installed: 1 January 1993

Government
  - Mayor: Edilson Ruiz de Freitas (PSB)
  - Deputy Mayor: Osmário de Bonfim Castro (PSB)

Population (2020)
  - Total: 29,070
- Time zone: UTC−3 (BRT)
- Postal code: 83560-000
- Area code: +55 41
- HDI: 0,637 - medium
- Website: itaperucu.pr.gov.br (in Portuguese)

Itaperuçu is a municipality in the state of Paraná in the Southern Region of Brazil. The name Itaperuçu in the indigenous Guaraní language means literally "to make the big path of the rock". From Itá = rock; peru: wander, hike, and ussu: big.

== See also ==
- List of municipalities in Paraná
