= Campo Magro =

Human settlement in Brazil

Coordinates: 25°22′08″S 49°27′03″W

- Municipality
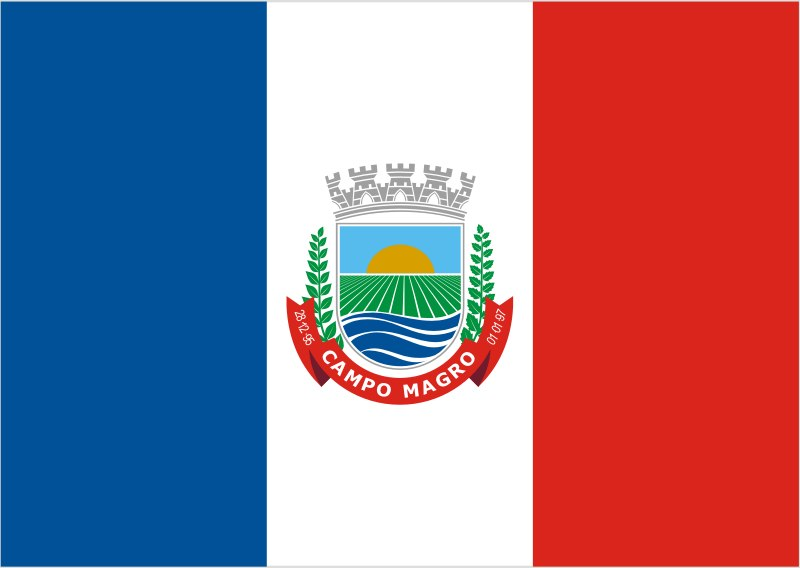
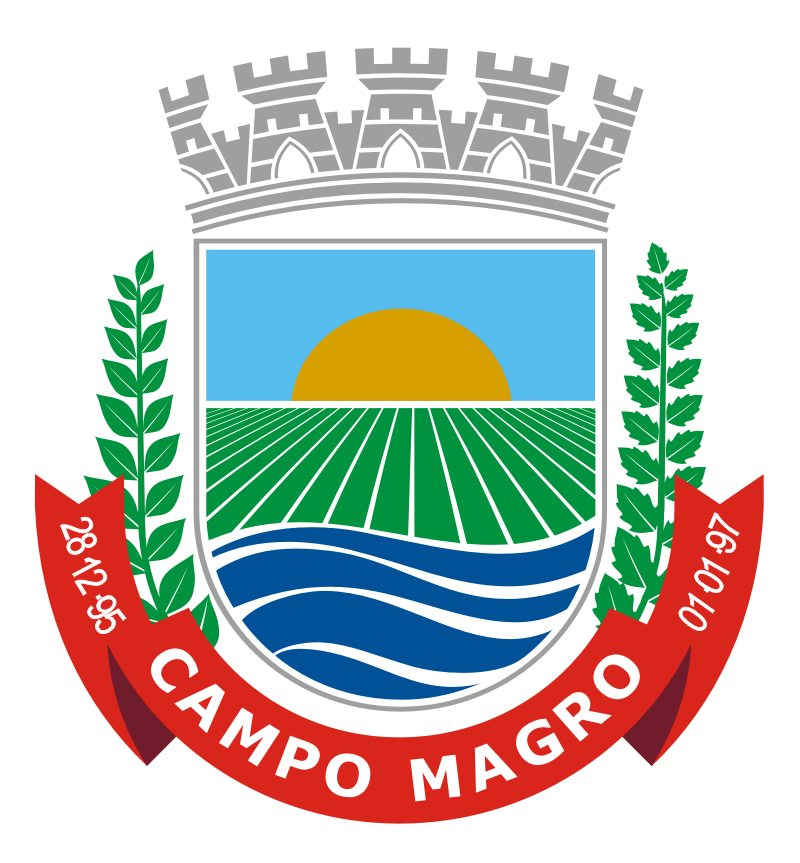
- Flag Coat of arms
- Interactive map of Campo Magro
- Country: Brazil
- Time zone: UTC−3 (BRT)

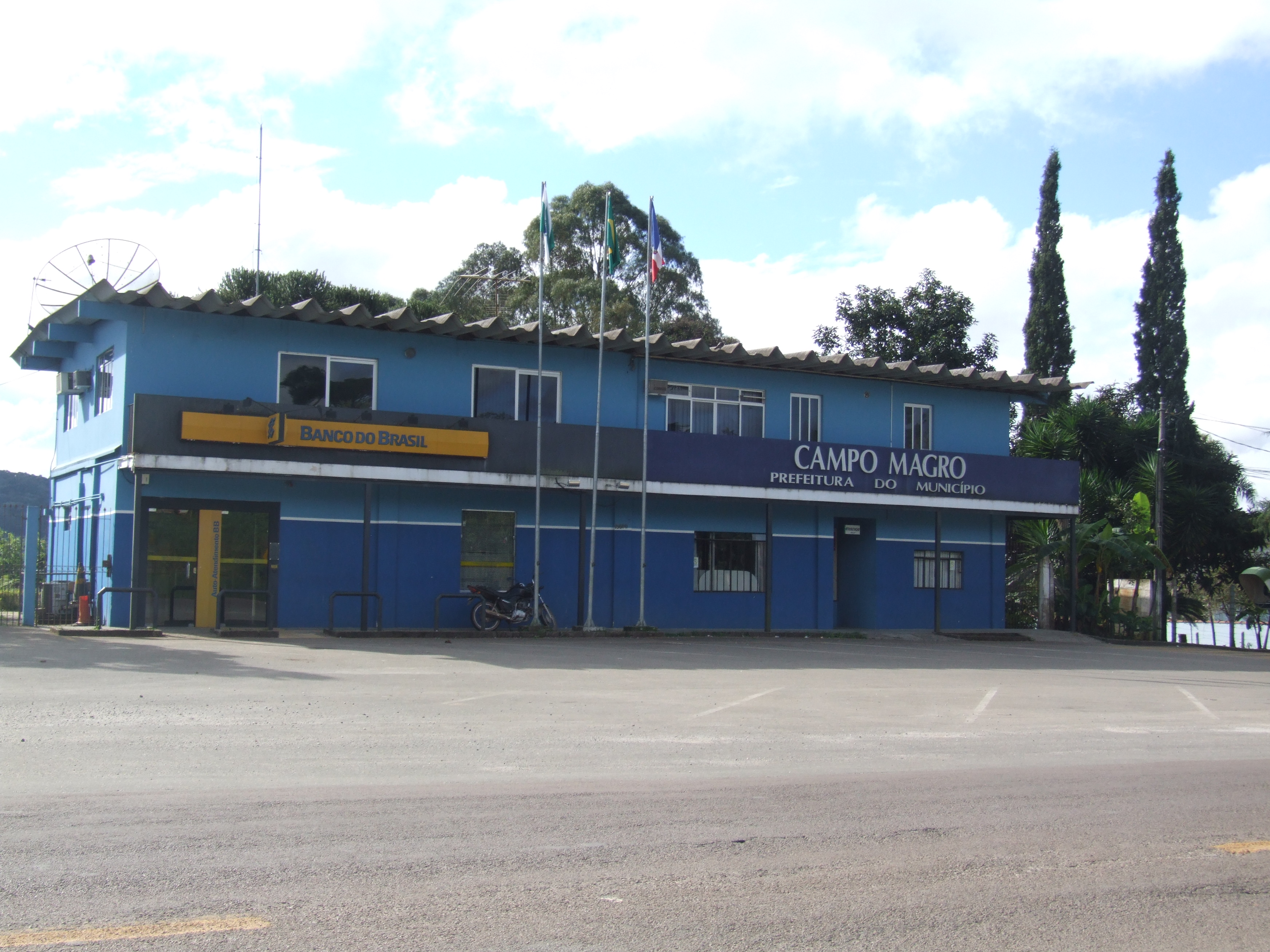

Campo Magro is a town and suburb of Curitiba in the state of Paraná, Brazil. It is a very young municipality, and its economy is growing around the road that links Curitiba to Castro, known as "Estrada do Cerne", a two way road. As of 2020, the estimated population was 29,740.

Ecotourism is a flourishing industry but its inconsistent growth has encouraged the inhabitants of the city to seek employment at Curitiba.

A very important source of income to the town are monthly payments from the federal and state governments for potable water provided to Curitiba.

Curitiba is expanding towards Campo Magro and is attracting real estate investment activity.
