= Quitandinha =

Municipality in Paraná, Brazil

Coordinates: 25.8719°S 49.4978°W

- Municipality
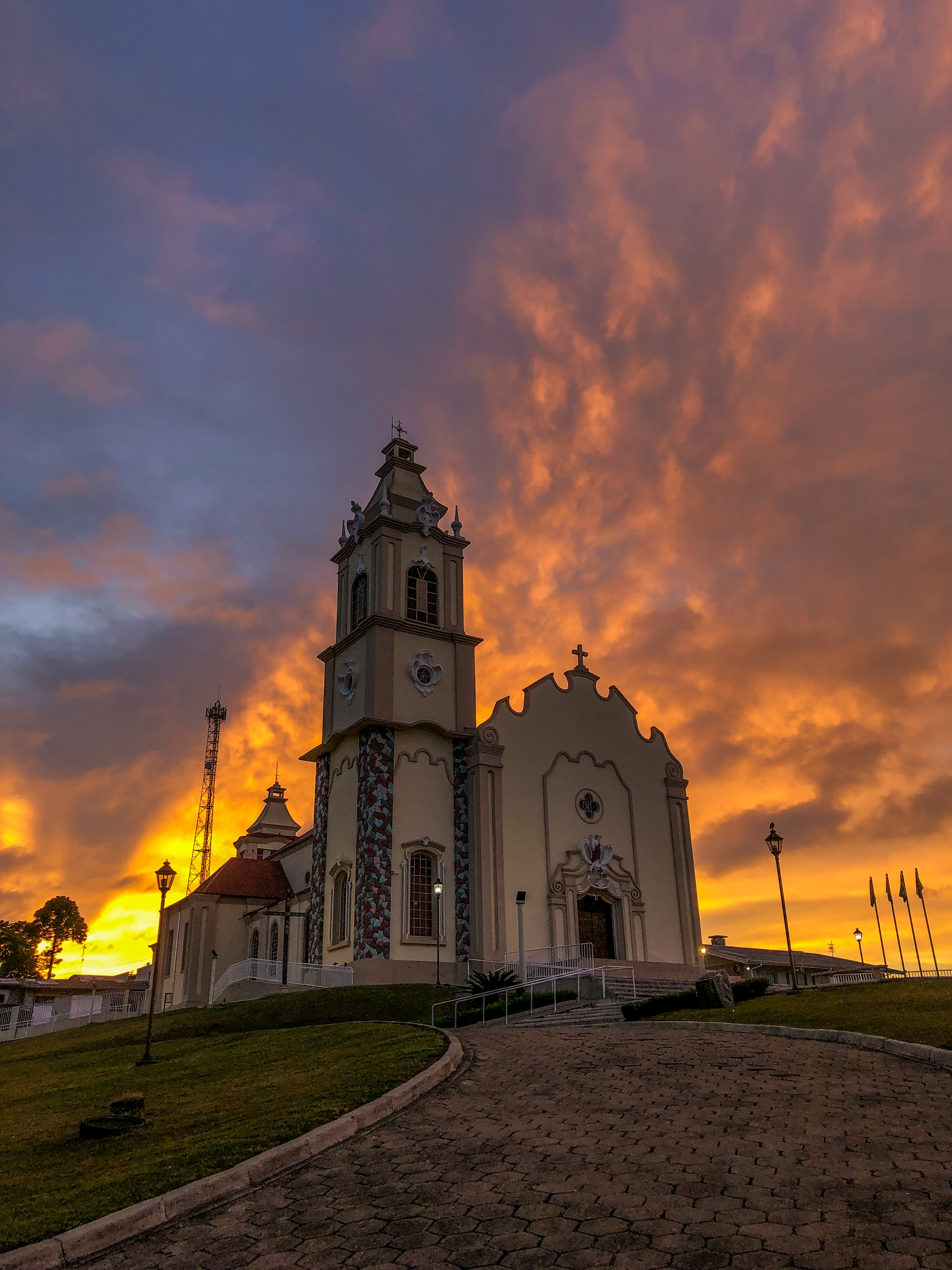

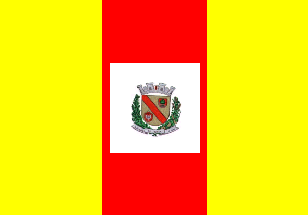
- Flag Coat of arms
- Interactive map of Quitandinha
- Country: Brazil
- Region: Southern
- State: Paraná
- Mesoregion: Metropolitana de Curitiba

Population (2020)
  - Total: 19,221
- Time zone: UTC−3 (BRT)

Quitandinha is a municipality in the state of Paraná in the Southern Region of Brazil.

== Etymology ==
The place name is based on the diminutive of the Kimbundu word kitanda (meaning "small market stall"). It dates back to the location's first restaurant on the BR-116 (then still called Estrada Estratégica). Its owner, Reinaldo Paolini, once stayed at the Hotel Palácio Quitandinha in Petrópolis. He was so impressed by this casino hotel that he named his restaurant after it. Over time, the name Quitandinha became common for the square on the major highway and later for the entire location.

The original name of the location was Areia Branca ("White Sand") because of the crystalline color of the sand that lay on the riverbanks after floods. Under this name, the location was elevated to a district by State Law No. 790 on November 14, 1951. It was only with its elevation to the status of a municipality in 1961 that it officially received the now more established name Quitandinha.

== See also ==
- List of municipalities in Paraná
