= Mais Médicos =

Brazilian social program

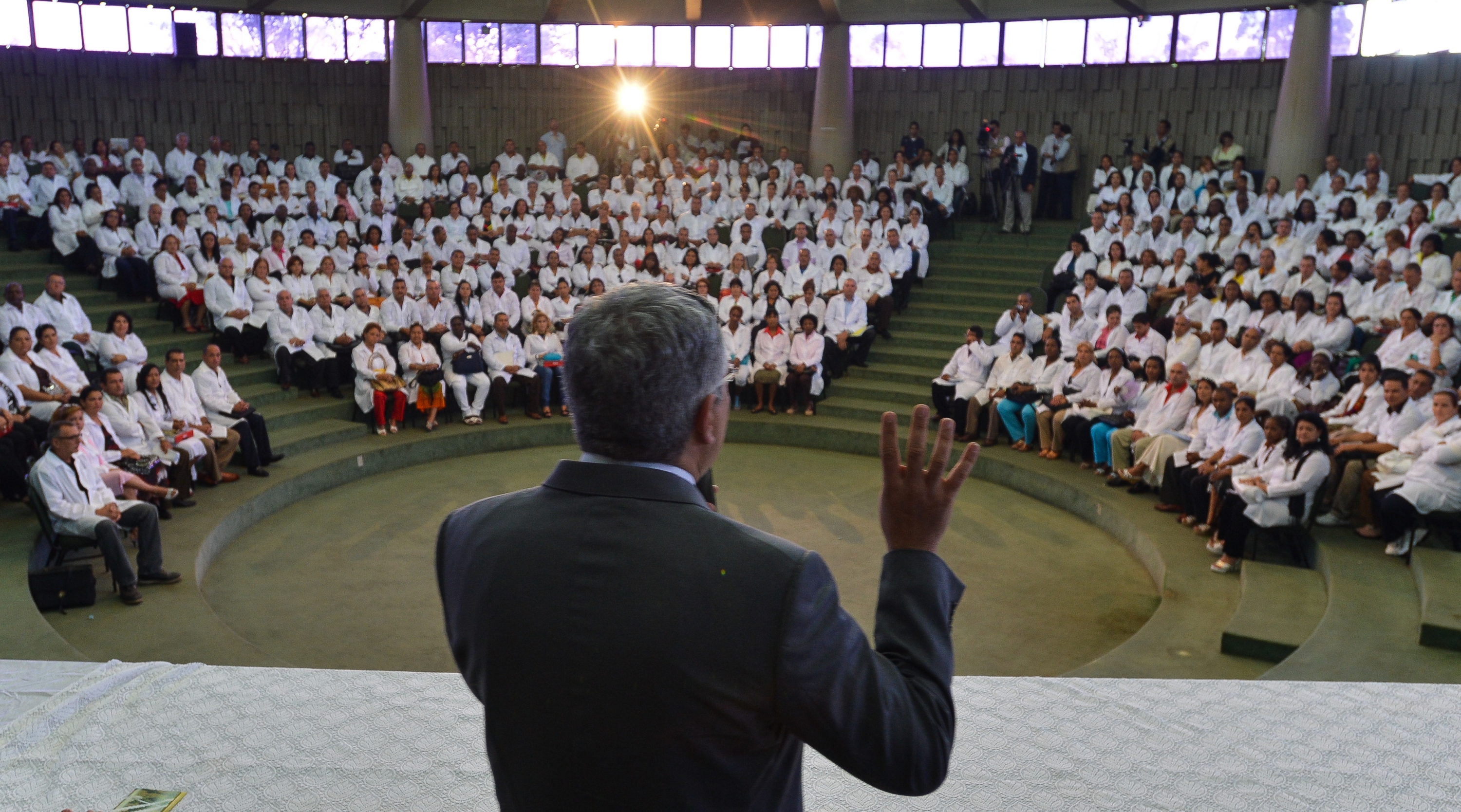
Alexandre Padilha, then Minister of Health, participates in the inaugural class to evaluate the Cuban professionals for the second stage of the Mais Médicos Program.

Mais Médicos (lit. 'More Doctors') is a Brazilian social program launched on July 8, 2013, by the Dilma government with the goal of covering the shortage of doctors in small municipalities and on the outskirts of Brazil's largest cities. The project provided 15,000 doctors to areas where there was a lack of professionals. By 2017, the program had 18,240 doctors and guaranteed access to 63 million people in 4,058 locations. The format of "importing" doctors from other countries was heavily criticized by associations representing doctors, civil society, health students and even the Public Prosecutor's Office.

On August 1, 2019, the Bolsonaro government launched the Médicos pelo Brasil (lit. 'Doctors for Brazil'), a replacement for Mais Médicos, but without confirming whether professionals from the previous project could be reassigned or had to undergo a new selection process. According to a preliminary analysis, the format of the new program would not allow Cuban doctors who remained in Brazil to be reassigned without validating their diploma in the country. The Bolsonaro government also proposed a 50% budget cut, which will affect not only medical programs, but also policies such as the Farmácia Popular do Brasil (lit. 'People's Pharmacy of Brazil'). Previously, 61% allocated to the purchase of equipment and renovation of hospitals in the oncology and maternity networks was cut from the health budget and transferred to the so-called secret budget.

== Background ==
Before the arrival of foreign professionals, Brazil had 388,015 doctors, which corresponded to two for each thousand inhabitants. In comparison, Argentina has a rate of 3.2, Portugal 4, the United States 2.6, South Korea 1.9 and Japan 2. Although this number was considered good, 22 states had a lower rate than the national average due to uneven distribution. While the Federal District and the states of São Paulo and Rio de Janeiro had rates well above the national average - 4.09, 3.62 and 2.64 doctors per thousand inhabitants respectively - the states of Maranhão, Pará and Amapá didn't even have one doctor per hundred thousand inhabitants, with rates of 0.71, 0.84 and 0.95 respectively.

In 2011, to try to solve the problem, the federal government created a program called Valorização dos Profissionais da Atenção Básica (English: Valorization of Primary Care Professionals) with the aim of attracting recently graduated doctors to poor regions by providing them with a salary of R$8,000. Around 3,000 municipalities requested 13,000 professionals, but 4,392 applied and, of these, only 3,800 signed contracts. In May 2013, the Ministry of Health announced that it was considering a strategy to bring foreign doctors to areas of poverty in order to minimize the shortage of professionals. The initiative was considered a short-term alternative until the expansion of the training of doctors achieves results. Sérgio Perini, a cardiologist and the only physician working in Santa Maria das Barreiras from April 2012 until the start of the program, commented: "People have no one to turn to for help but me. If I have more than three urgent cases to attend to immediately, what do I do?"

Between 1998 and 2003, the government of Tocantins implemented a program to bring Cuban doctors to the most remote areas of the state. At the time, Veja magazine published an article favorable to the program and criticized the Federal Council of Medicine for filing a lawsuit with the Public Prosecutor's Office demanding an end to the agreement with the Cuban government. However, Veja is currently against the Mais Médicos, claiming that Cuba has one of the worst health systems in the world and that the project "will flood Brazil with communist spies".

== The program ==
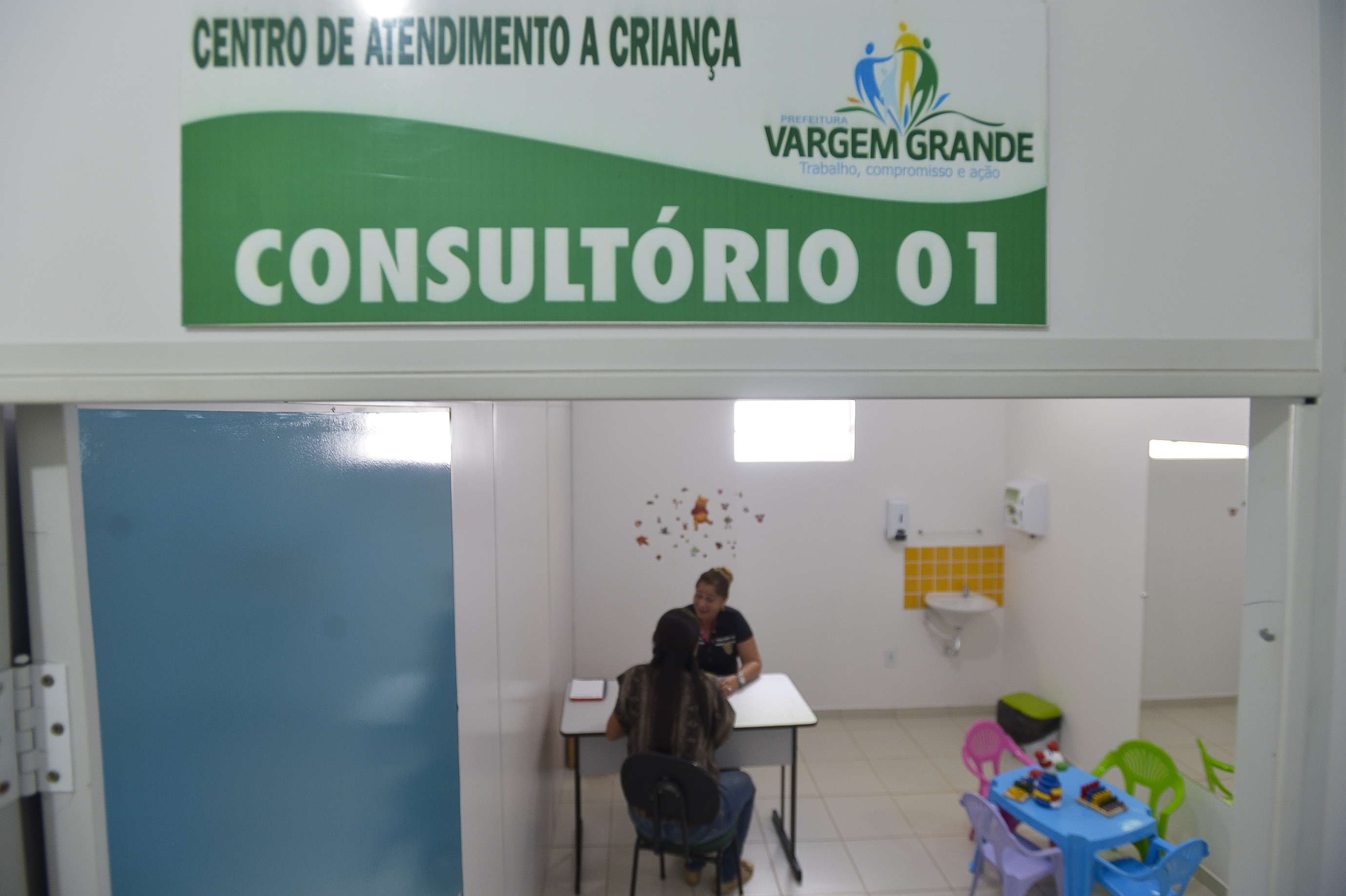
Cuban doctor Josefa Rebeca Rodriguez provides care in the municipality of Vargem Grande. Photo: Marcello Casal Jr./ABr

Launched on July 8, 2013, by President Dilma Rousseff, the Mais Médicos Program was composed of two phases. The first was to establish doctors, whether Brazilian or foreign, in the public health network in municipalities in the countryside and on the outskirts of big cities. The second was to extend the medical course by two years, a proposal flexibilized by the government when faced with criticism. The first phase, aimed at enrolling doctors who had graduated in Brazil or were already authorized to practice in the country to work in places where there are few professionals, met only 6% of the demand. Later, applications were opened to doctors working abroad. The foreign professionals had to spend three weeks under evaluation by a university before being allowed to work and the government would pay for those selected to travel to Brazil. The program was valid for three years and could be extended for another three.

According to the Ministry of Health, Brazilian professionals were prioritized to fill the vacancies. Doctors with international diplomas would work with provisional professional authorization, restricted to primary care and the regions where they were allocated by the program. The shift schedule would be 40 hours a week and the doctors would be paid a stipend of R$10,000. In addition, the professionals would receive housing and food allowances, a responsibility of the municipalities. While the Portuguese, Argentinians and Spaniards signed up voluntarily for the program, the Cubans acted as service providers for a contract sold by the Cuban government to the Ministry of Health under the intermediation of the Pan American Health Organization of the World Health Organization (PAHO/WHO). The initial salary of US$3,000 was passed on to the Cuban government, which transferred only 40% of the money (US$400) to the doctors, causing criticism from medical associations and the opposition.

At the beginning of 2014, after an investigation was launched by the Public Prosecutor's Office, the federal government announced that the Cuban doctors would receive US$1245 in addition to their stipend. From March 2014, the Cuban professionals were entitled to US$845, with the remaining US$400 going to the Cuban government. According to the Minister of Health at the time, Arthur Chioro, the increase didn't represent an extra expense for Brazil: "There's not a penny more from the Brazilian government, it's the same resource that is now being transferred [to the professional] by the Cuban government. What happened was a negotiation between President Dilma and Cuba".

In 2017, there were 8,316 Brazilians in the program, which represented 45.6% of the total. The Ministry of Health's priority was to increase national participation, make the initiative more independent and guarantee medical care for the population.

== Reception ==
=== Opinion polls ===
In June 2013, according to Datafolha, 47% of the population was in favor of the program and 48% opposed. In the August survey by the same institute, the favorable vote was 54% and the unfavorable vote was 40%. According to a survey by the MDA institute, commissioned by the National Transport Confederation and carried out in September, 73.9% of the population was in favor of foreign physicians working in the country. Based on a survey by the Institute of Science, Technology and Quality (ICTQ), 61% of Porto Alegre residents supported the program, while the average for all sixteen capitals surveyed was 33%. Another poll, made by the Methodus Institute, indicated that 59.3% of people from Rio Grande do Sul approved of the project.

=== Medical organizations ===
The Mais Médicos Program was received negatively by medical organizations. At the end of July 2013, a series of demonstrations against the project were organized. On August 23, 2013, the Brazilian Medical Association (AMB) and the Federal Council of Medicine (CFM) filed a lawsuit with the Supreme Federal Court (STF) to suspend the program. In their petition, the organizations claimed that hiring professionals trained in other countries without passing the National Medical Diploma Revalidation Exam (Revalida) would be illegal. "The measure deprives the regional medical councils of the competence to assess the professional quality of the exchange doctor, since it removes the possibility of supervising professional practice by analyzing the documents required to practice medicine," stated the document. The organizations also claimed that the government's measure promoted the illegal practice of medicine: "The federal administration's proposal does not guarantee quality public policies and allows the irregular and illegal practice of medicine in Brazil, since everyone knows that there is no revalidation".

On August 23, 2013, the president of the Regional Council of Medicine of Minas Gerais (CRM-MG), João Batista Gomes Soares, said that Brazilian doctors should not "help" or be "sponsors" of foreign professionals and that he would advise his fellow professionals not to assist their Cuban colleagues. João Batista Ribeiro, head judge of the 5th Federal Court of Minas Gerais, denied a request from the CRM-MG not to grant professional registration to foreign physicians. According to Ribeiro, the entity's claim that the provisional measure that instituted the Mais Médicos Program was unconstitutional was unjustified.

In Fortaleza, 96 foreign-trained professionals were harassed by a group of doctors from Ceará. The incident occurred when the foreigners were leaving the inaugural training class and around 50 Brazilian doctors formed a human corridor and harassed them. The foreign doctors stayed for 40 minutes after the inaugural lecture to avoid the corridor set up by the Ceará residents. The police followed the protest closely, but did not intervene. The demonstration was seen as an "act of xenophobia" by a secretary at the Ministry of Health.

In December 2013, doctor Drauzio Varella predicted that the Mais Médicos Program would have "very little impact on the country's public health", because it "is a palliative measure". Later, Varella stated that this "palliative measure" was "the internalization program with the greatest reach and duration. Never has a program reached so many people in the national territory and lasted so long".

=== Opposition politicians ===
The Mais Médicos Program was questioned by then federal deputy Jair Bolsonaro (PP-RJ), who argued that it was unethical because it involved basic care, a field that is the responsibility of nurses and not doctors. The leader of the PSDB in the Chamber, Carlos Sampaio, said that he would ask the Public Prosecutor's Office to monitor the program and the professionals hired by the Brazilian government with regard to compliance with the law. He also defended the Revalida exam for foreign doctors. The then president of the PSDB, senator Aécio Neves, criticized President Dilma Rousseff for having vetoed the opposition's amendment establishing a specific career for the program's professionals, through a public competition, guaranteeing their progression and ensuring that the program's benefits would be guaranteed to the population over the long term.

=== World Health Organization (WHO) ===
At the end of July 2013, PAHO/WHO reported that it was pleased with the launch of Mais Médicos by the Brazilian government. According to the agency, the measure was consistent with WHO resolutions and recommendations on universal health coverage, the strengthening of basic and primary care in the sector and equity in health care for the population. For PAHO/WHO, the initiatives to bring doctors to remote communities, to create new medical schools and expand the enrollment of students from poorer regions, as well as the number of medical residencies, were appropriate. According to the organization, countries with the same problems as Brazil were experiencing the results of implementing similar measures.

A note signed by the Teotônio Vilela Institute, linked to the PSDB, stated that PAHO/WHO's support for Mais Médicos only served as a "more serious layer" to the implementation of the program which, according to the text, encouraged the enslavement of Cuban doctors. BBC Brasil asked Gláucia Massoni, a lawyer specializing in labor law, to analyze the document signed between the government and PAHO/WHO. According to her, the program had legal certainty, since "the doctors come as exchange students, there is no employer-employee relationship or CLT".

=== Pan American Health Organization (PAHO) ===
In March 2015, Jornal da Band released recordings of a meeting prior to the launch of Mais Médicos, in which advisors from the Ministry of Health and the then coordinator of the program at the Pan American Health Organization (PAHO) discussed ways of disguising the objective of assisting the Cuban government by allocating most of the budget to Cuban professionals. In 2018, TV Globo and Folha de S. Paulo had access to telegrams that revealed that the proposal to create Mais Médicos came from the Cuban government and not the Brazilian government, in a secret commercial agreement between the two countries.

The Dilma government's Minister of Health, Alexandre Padilha, denied the confidential aspect of the negotiations and stated that the program had been endorsed by the Brazilian Congress, with the approval of all the political parties, the Supreme Court, the Court of Auditors and the World Health Organization. However, the documents revealed that the Dilma government was mediated by PAHO to prevent the project from needing to be approved by Congress. It also exposed that the Cuban government was concerned about a possible evaluation process for the doctors in Brazil and a potential rejection of their entry into Brazilian territory. As a result, it proposed that the professional assessment be carried out previously in Cuba. Brazil would only integrate the doctors with training aimed at adapting to the language, administrative conduct and Brazilian legislation.

=== Departure from duties ===
According to the Ministry of Health, of the 11,400 doctors working in the program in March 2015, forty had quit.

== Cuba's departure ==
On November 14, 2018, Cuba announced in a statement that it was abandoning the Mais Médicos Program. According to them, the withdrawal was due to President-elect Jair Bolsonaro's announcement of changes in the terms of cooperation, which included direct payment to medical professionals provided by Cuba (and not through the Pan American Health Organization), permission to live with their families in Brazil and the requirement to revalidate their diplomas. With the departure, around 8,556 Cuban doctors left the program.

In order to resolve the situation, the Brazilian government launched a public tender to replace the Cubans. During the same period, the São Paulo Regional Council of Medicine (Cremesp) accelerated the issuing of professional registrations to recently graduated doctors interested in enrolling in the Mais Médicos Program. On November 25, the Ministry of Health reported that 96.6% of the vacancies in the project had been filled. However, on December 14, when the deadline for registrants to show up expired, 30% of the professionals had still not appeared in their respective locations.

== Resumption of the Mais Médicos Program ==
On March 20, 2023, Lula and the Minister of Health, Nísia Trindade, announced the resumption of the Mais Médicos Program prioritizing Brazilian professionals. Initially, it plans to open 15,000 new vacancies, including other areas of health, such as dentistry, nursing and social assistance. According to the federal government, it should guarantee "lower costs for municipalities, greater agility in replacing professionals and conditions for them to remain in these locations". By the end of 2023, the program expects around 28,000 professionals to join, covering 96 million people in primary care.

Additional benefits have been provided for professionals working in the remote regions of the country. Participating doctors who graduated with the help of the Financing Fund for Higher Education Students (FIES) will receive subsidies to pay off the debt; recent graduates who complete the residency program in remote areas will also earn financial incentives.

== See also ==
- Cuban medical internationalism
- Pan American Health Organization
